= Andrei Mocioni =

Austrian and Hungarian jurist and politician

Andrei Mocioni de Foen
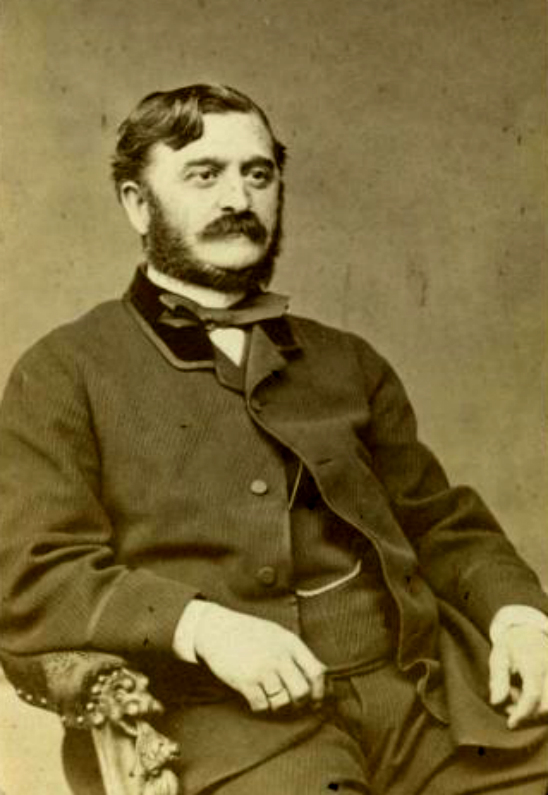
- Mocioni as Diet of Hungary deputy, 1865

Supreme commissioner for the Banat
- In office 1849–1852

Extraordinary counsel in the Imperial Diet
- In office May 31 – September 29, 1860

Member of the National Assembly of Hungary
- In office December 14, 1865 – 1869
- Constituency: Krassó County

Personal details
- Born: June 27, 1812 Pest, Kingdom of Hungary, Austrian Empire
- Died: May 5, 1880 (aged 67) Temesvár, Transleithania, Austria-Hungary
- Party: Deákist (1865)
- Other political affiliations: Conservative (1847–1848)
- Spouse: Laura Csernovich
- Relations: Anton Mocioni (brother); Gheorghe Mocioni (brother); Petar Čarnojević (father-in-law); Alexandru Mocioni (nephew)
- Profession: Landowner, jurist, civil servant, journalist, businessman

Andrei Mocioni de Foen (also spelled Andrea de Mocioni or Andreiu Mocionĭ, last name also Mocsonyi, Mocsoni, Mocionyi or Mocsony; German: Andreas Mocioni de Foen or Andreas von Mocsonyi, Hungarian: fényi Mocsonyi András; June 27, 1812 – April 23/May 5, 1880) was an Austrian and Hungarian jurist, politician, and informal leader of the ethnic Romanian community, one of the founding members of the Romanian Academy. Of a mixed Aromanian and Albanian background, raised as a Greek Orthodox, he belonged to the Mocioni family, which had been elevated to Hungarian nobility. He was brought up at his family estate in the Banat, at Foeni, where he joined the administrative apparatus, and identified as a Romanian since at least the 1830s. He rose to prominence during the Hungarian Revolution of 1848: he was a supporter of the House of Lorraine, trying to obtain increased autonomy for Banat Romanians in exchange for loyalism. The Austrians appointed Mocioni to an executive position over that region, but curbed his expectations by including the Banat as a whole into the Voivodeship of Serbia. This disappointment pushed Mocioni to renounce politics during much of the 1850s.

The attempt by Austria to ensure a new administrative formula in the 1860s saw Mocioni's co-option into the Imperial Diet. He also organized, in 1860, the National Assembly in the Banat—an abortive project, seeking to obtain autonomy on ethnic grounds. He then oscillated between ethnic federalism within a nominal Hungarian realm and full centralism in Austria's custody, while failing in his bid to promote election boycott as a political weapon. He had noted political rivalries with Romanians who sided with Hungarian radicalism, in particular Eftimie Murgu. Serving one full term in the Diet of Hungary, Mocioni also turned to cooperation with the Romanians of Transylvania, and helped Andrei Șaguna to reestablish an independent Transylvanian Metropolis for Romanian Orthodox Christians. Alongside his brothers Gheorghe and Anton, and his lawyer Vincențiu Babeș, he founded the newspaper Albina of Vienna.

The creation of Austria-Hungary and the Banat's absorption into the Lands of the Crown of Saint Stephen were significant blows for Mocioni's nationalist-loyalist campaign. After a brief, failed attempt of an anti-Habsburg alliance with the exiled Hungarian revolutionaries led by Lajos Kossuth, Mocioni withdrew to Foeni, ailing and out of the public eye for the final decade of his life. He was still a noted philanthropist and sponsor of the Romanian press, but had conflicts with Krassó County voters and the Romanian peasants on his estates, a matter which contributed to his voluntary isolation. He was survived by his wife Laura, daughter of Petar Čarnojević, and by his nephew, the politician Alexandru Mocioni.

== Biography ==
=== Origins and early life ===
The Mocionis were probably descended from Petru Mucină, an Aromanian (or "Macedo-Romanian") priest from Aspropotamos in Thessaly or Moscopole, who declared loyalty to the Habsburg monarchy and served in the Great Turkish War. He and one of his brothers were killed in action somewhere in the Banat. Archpriest Constantin Mocioni, or "Constantinus Motsonyi", who may have been Mucină's son, settled among the Greek Orthodox (Greek, Romanian, and Aromanian) community of Pest in the 1740s. Family documents suggest that he was originally from Moscopole, and that he died at 110 years of age; under his watch, the family established lucrative businesses and began purchasing estates in Hungary and the Banat. His two sons Andrei and Mihai were raised into the nobility by King-Emperor Joseph II: the former in February 1783, the latter in June 1798, after distinguished service in the War of the First Coalition. The Mocionis were thus one of some 200 Aromanian families to receive titles, and became integrated with the 12,500 Romanian noble families attested in Hungary by 1800 (from a total 340,000).

Andrei the elder was killed in mysterious circumstances before he could receive his diploma, but this was granted to his wife. The more senior branch established by them became known as Mocioni de Foen, or fényi Mocsonyi, in reference to its core estate of Foeni (Fény). This was by contrast with Mihai's descendants, the armalist Mocionis, who did not hold a titular estate—although they built a manor at Marosberkes (now Birchiș, Romania), they were mostly based in Pest, where they founded the Kefala Library. Andrei the second was a grandson of the original Andrei, born to lawyer Ioan Mocioni de Foen (1780–1854) and his wife Iuliana Panaiot (1787–1858). On his mother's side, Andrei had Albanian roots. He had an elder brother, Petru, born in 1808, and two junior ones: Anton and Gheorghe (born 1816 and 1823, respectively). Other siblings included brothers George and Lucian (the latter of whom died young) and sister Ecaterina. Ioan and Iuliana together had as many as 11 other children. Andrei was simultaneously the uncle and cousin of writer Alexandru Mocioni, born from a consanguine marriage between Ecaterina and her uncle Mihai Mocioni.

Mocioni de Foen coat of arms, granted 1783

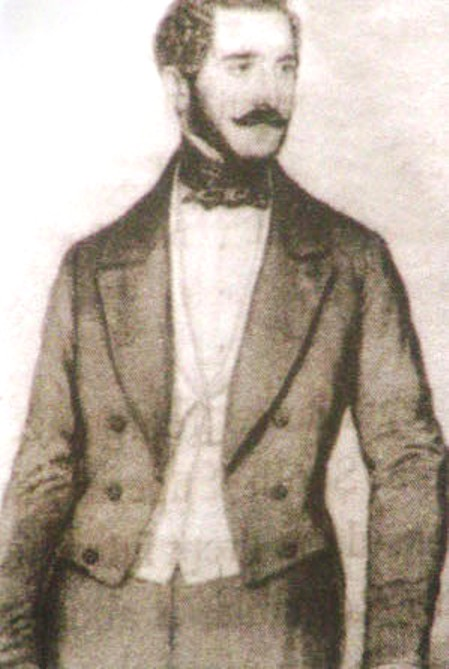
Lithograph of Andrei Mocioni, ca. 1840

Andrei the younger was a native of Pest, but grew up mostly in Foeni where, according to scholar Păun Otiman, he received "a profoundly Christian Orthodox education, inspired by Macedo-Romanian traditions and culture". Originally, the Mocionis only spoke Aromanian and Hungarian. Nevertheless, the family encouraged intercultural contacts, with Ioan speaking as many as eleven languages. According to the Banatian Serb journalist Mihailo Polit-Desančić, the local Mocionis, including Andrei, also made a point of learning Serbian, and "sort of carried themselves like Serbs". Seen by his contemporaries as a man of outstanding culture and upbringing, Andrei had "perfect" command of Aromanian, Romanian, Hungarian, Serbian, as well as Latin, French, and German. Like his father, he took a law degree in 1828 or 1832, from the Royal University of Pest. He then worked in the local administration of Banat. In 1836, he was the second-ranked notary of Torontál County, being appointed first pretor in 1843. Ethnologist Elena Rodica Colta dates the Mocionis' definitive self-identification as Romanians to this period, noting that they believed the entire Aromanian ethnos to be a branch of the Romanian community. During his time in Pest, Andrei began frequenting the literary salon organized by Atanasiu Grabovski de Apadia in Terézváros, meeting with exponents of Aromanian and Romanian causes.

While participating in Torontál's congregatio generalis, Andrei Mocioni sat with the "conservative-progressive" side of the Romanian caucus, taking his distance from the revolutionary liberals. Thanks in part to his contribution, Torontál remained a safe seat for the conservative club of István Széchenyi, committed to "moderate progress" for the country at large, with "national conservation" for the Romanians. In 1847, he managed to obtain a seat in the Diet of Hungary, for his brother Petru, canvassing votes from conservative Hungarians, Serbs, Bulgarians, Armenians and Swabians.

=== 1848 revolution and Banat leadership ===
The same period saw him dragged into the Austrian and Hungarian Revolutions. Like many Romanians, Mocioni supported the former's liberal reforms, and remained loyal to Franz Joseph I, opposing the rise of Hungarian nationalism. This pitted him against the pro-Hungarian revolutionary Eftimie Murgu, who enlisted the loyalties of various other Banatians. The Hungarian State reacted by confiscating Mocioni's property and forcing him into exile. By September 1849, he was in Vienna, where he acted as a Romanian representative, alongside Ioan Dobran and Vincențiu Babeș. Petru Mocioni was also active there as a "man of trust" of the Banatian Romanians, presenting Franz Stadion with a set of political proposals on their behalf.

Following the surrender at Világos and the resumption of Austrian control, Mocioni's loyalty was rewarded, and he was appointed supreme commissioner for the Banat, within the new Voivodeship of Serbia and Banat of Temeschwar. As such, he governed directly over some 600,000 people. However, he disliked this arrangement, and, in December 1849, petitioned Prince Felix of Schwarzenberg to obtain the secession of Banat as an autonomous, Romanian, province. During his mandate, the administration was staffed with a growing number of Romanians. In tandem, his Mocioni relatives approached the Romanians of Transylvania, also loyalists, and together with them began pressing for a Romanian dukedom to be created out of Romanian territories in Hungary. The commissioner was also involved in such projects, proposing that a Romanian press be set up in Arad, located on the Banat's traditional border with Transylvania and Partium. By 1850, Mocioni was also campaigning to reestablish a Transylvanian (Romanian) Orthodox Metropolis, fully separated from the Patriarchate of Karlovci. The cause had first been embraced by Petru in the 1840s.

In 1852, Mocioni ultimately resigned as commissioner, expressing his protest toward the treatment of Romanians by the Austrian government. However, he was asked to reconsider by the authorities, who feared that they were becoming unpopular with the majority population. Although he did not resume his earlier posting, he went on to serve as president of the Central Commission in Temeschwar (Timișoara); he was also a counsel for the Austrian Court of Cassation. He resigned all positions in the state apparatus in 1856, and withdrew to Foeni. This decision was cemented in 1858 by the death of brother Petru, killed by his own landlord or doorman in Pest. The killing, which some authors see as a political assassination, ended with a celebrity trial in which Emanoil Gojdu represented the Mocionis as plaintiffs.

In 1859, at Foeni, Mocioni married a Serb coreligionist, Laura, the Countess Csernovich (Čarnojević). A woman of "outstanding beauty", she was also noted for collecting Ancient Roman coins and paintings with Roman subjects by Nicola Popescu. Her father, Graf Petar Čarnojević, had been an ally of the Hungarian revolutionaries; dispossessed and bankrupt, he moved to Foeni to live with the couple. They also shared the manor with Alexandru and the other armalist Mocionis, who were similarly disappointed with Hungarian politics, and who progressively withdrew from Pest.

Author Atanasie Marian Marienescu notes that Mocioni, "everywhere encouraged and supported by the Romanian intelligentsia, became in all places a leader of the Romanians in national and church causes, and this leadership was recognized by his brothers as well." His program was outlined in Caus'a limbelor și națiunalităților in Austri'a ("The Cause of Languages and Nationalities in Austria"), which was anonymously printed in 1860 by the Mekhitarists of Vienna, and which, according to literary historian Aurel Vasiliu, Mocioni may have authored himself. It defined as "absurd" the notion of "Hungarian self-government within Austria", while describing federalization as the best option for all Austrian Romanians, as well as for the "non-Magyar brotherly peoples". The manifesto also spoke at length about the dangers of Magyarization, claiming that Hungarian rule had always treated Romanians as "herds of cattle". By contrast, German nationalism was "not something Romanians have ever feared, nor will they ever fear it; it may sometimes wander off, as it has these past ten years, and as such impair our nation's culture, development and prosperity for some time: but to denationalize us—that, never!"

In October 1861, Adolf Dobriansky, who aspired to creating a caucus for the Ruthenians of Carpathia, referred to Mocioni and Ján Francisci as his personal examples in politics. From about 1860, Mocioni had dedicated himself to the national awakening of Romanians, networking between the Austrian subjects in the Banat, Transylvania, and the Duchy of Bukovina, and those residing in the newly formed United Principalities. In November 1860, as Count Mensdorff-Pouilly was sent over to report to Franz Joseph on the demands of Banat Romanians, Mocioni called in and organized a National Assembly. This demanded the creation of a Banat Captaincy, and, when the request was denied, an administrative incorporation with Transylvania. He noted that Romanians needed to form a singular "moral body", "called upon as a nation to partake in Austria's constitutional life." In his Memorandum to the Throne, Mocioni also theorized that the Banat was an "individuality" distinct from the Serbian and Hungarian regions, and suggested that "never-ending problems" would result from its continued amalgamation.

=== Imperial Diet and church separation ===
Ethnic map of the Serbian Voivodeship and Banat Military Frontier (Mg.), also marking the traditional borders of Banat. Serbs in red, Romanians in yellow, Hungarians in green. Danube and Banat Swabians in black, Czechs and Slovaks in blue, Banat Bulgarians in pink

On May 31, 1860, Mocioni was co-opted by the Imperial Diet, which contemplated administrative reforms based on new ethnic arrangements. He was an "extraordinary counsel", alongside Andrei Șaguna of Transylvania and Nicolae de Petrino of Bukovina, supporting regional autonomy and the reestablishment and a Romanian Metropolis. By origin, all three were in fact Aromanians. Reportedly, both Șaguna and Mocioni objected to Diet selections being non-democratic, agreeing with György Apponyi that the delegates could only be said to represent themselves. Their objection was registered, but they were asked by Archduke Rainer not to insist on this point. Seen from his regional constituency, Mocioni was also one of two representatives of the Voivodeship, including the Banat. The other was a Serb prelate, Samuilo Maširević. By September 1860, Mocioni clarified that he considered himself a legitimate Banat and "people's" representative.

On June 6, Mocioni was elected to the Budget Committee, and from this position campaigned to have Romanian Orthodox churches subsidized on par with other state-recognized religions. Proclaiming the equality of nations against demands for Hungarian hegemony, he found himself debating the issue with György Majláth, who accused him of fostering the rebellious doctrines of Giuseppe Garibaldi. Mocioni defended his ideas as mainstream, arguing that equality had been promised by Franz Joseph himself. In the end, Mocioni sided with the "centralists", who supported proportional representation within a centralized Austria; Petrino, a "federalist", wanted regional decentralization on the basis of old laws, which, while favoring Bukovinians, would have left Romanians in Hungary underrepresented as a group. The two made common cause in their opposition to a projected union between Bukovina and Austrian Galicia.

Mocioni's mandate ended with the Diet recall on September 29, 1860. He had failed in his bid to secure Banat autonomy: the region, alongside all of the Voivodeship, was re-annexed to the Hungarian crown in December 1860. In April 1861, Mocioni persuaded the Banat Romanians to boycott future elections for the reestablished Hungarian Diet. This decision was overturned later that year, when a new ethnic assembly passed a resolution calling for single Romanian candidatures, supported by all voters. Mocioni himself was elected for Krassó (Caraș) County, at Lugoj (Lugos). His rival was Murgu, who sided with the Resolution Party and supported incorporation with Hungary. Mocioni, perceived as the Romanian nationalist candidate, won 621 votes to 94, with only eight Romanians voting against him. The celebratory crowd carried the Romanian tricolor inscribed with the slogan Sa traiésca D. Andreiu de Mocioni, alesu cercului Lugosiu ("Long Live M. Andreiu de Mocioni, Elected by Lugoj Circle"). The speaker, a Concilor Ioanovits, suggested that the election would confirm Mocioni as the Banat leader, a Romanian equivalent to József Eötvös.

However, Mocioni had not agreed to be listed as a candidate, and immediately renounced his seat. In his address, he explained that "he had nothing in common with the Hungarian diet of Pest, since he had never intended to become a Hungarian." He also had a publicized row with the Temeschwar Burgrave, the pro-Hungarian Petru Cermena, but their dispute was ultimately patched up by Babeș. The Diet itself was dissolved later that year. Mocioni's solution to these setbacks was the attempted creation of a de facto "political body" and "crown land" for all Romanians of the Empire. A concrete project was advanced by Iosif Hodoșiu in early 1861. It would have established a "Romanian national diet" for Transylvania, the Banat, Bukovina, as well as Crișana and Maramureș.

In the parallel debate over church affairs, Șaguna, the designated Metropolitan, had Mocioni as one of his "most ardent supporters", one "fighting like a virile lion for the hierarchic separation". Mediating between the Karlovci Patriarch Josif Rajačić and his Romanian clergy, he proposed to convene a representative synod on the issue of separation, knowing that it would favor the Romanians. The Patriarch resisted this move and suspended the negotiations, arguing that "the [Serb] nation would have me stoned to death". Rajačić's death in late 1861 created confusion among the Serb bishops, empowering Mocioni to network and campaign for the national schism. He outlined his political manifesto for autonomy in articles for Gazeta Transilvaniei of Corona, as well as in reports addressed to Franz Joseph. That year, with Șaguna and Alexandru Sterca-Șuluțiu, Mocioni established ASTRA Society, which promoted Romanian identity and culture, created despite continued chicanery from Hungarian officials. He also placed a bid for ASTRA's presidency, but lost to Șaguna.

He was more successful in his campaigning for an Orthodox metropolis, set up in December 1864; from 1865, it incorporated Banatian Romanian churches as the Diocese of Caransebeș. Already in 1862, Mocioni, Șaguna, and Eudoxiu Hurmuzachi had managed to obtain Franz Joseph's sympathy on this issue. He wrote about this victory in Telegraful Român of Transylvania and Concordia of Bukovina, persuading "right-believing Romanians" not to participate in the election of a Rajačić replacement. Nevertheless, Mocioni was disappointed with Șaguna, who did not back his plan for creating a new bishopric at Temeschwar. During this clash, he withdrew his financial support for the church historian Nicolae Tincu-Velea, who had to print his works with ASTRA.

=== Hungarian Diet ===
Returning to Arad, Mocioni helped establish there a National Culture and Enlightenment Association, presided upon by Prokopije Ivačković and Anton Mocioni. It received his collection of historical documents, and appointed him a delegate to Vienna, to thank the emperor for supporting Romanian culture. In 1863, his philanthropy expanded. He donated his only source of income, the revenue of Foeni, to the famine-stricken population of that village, and even ran into debt in his effort to provide for them. He was also interested in horse breeding, and one of his steeds became the ancestor of an equine string that populated much of Foeni.

For a while, the Romanians of Banat continued to plead with the emperor for Romanian self-rule in the Banat. One such petition, circulated in December 1863, also asked Franz Joseph to surround himself with Romanian advisers, including "Andrea de Mocioni, lord of Foeni", a man distinguished by "political, patriotic, and national virtues". As noted by historian Tudor-Radu Tiron, the restoration of Hungarian rule ultimately pushed the Mocionis back into Hungarian politics, which explains why Andrei, Anton and Gheorghe all took seats in the last Diet of Hungary (1865). Elected at Lugoj, Andrei served from December 14, 1865, and joined the Deák Party during his tenure; the other brothers were independent Romanian deputies. Alexandru also won a Rittberg seat in that legislature. Known as the theoretician of national liberalism, he was a main proponent of the Nationalities Bill, which, if adopted, would have set up autonomous units for the Romanians in Hungary.

By then, the Mocionis' contribution to the national cause was being recognized in the United Principalities, customarily known as the "Principality of Romania". From January 1865, he was an honorary member of the nationalist Bucovina Society. On April 22, 1866, the Romanian Regency appointed Andrei Mocioni a founding member of the Romanian Academy (or "Romanian Literary Society", as it was known at the time). He was inducted as a Banat representative, alongside Babeș—who, in 1883, wrote Mocioni's biography. From 1861, the Mocionis and Babeș had cooperated in countering Hungarian nationalist propaganda abroad, publicizing the Romanian point of view. According to Babeș, their effort was sabotaged by Abdolonyme Ubicini, István Türr, and Giovenale Vegezzi Ruscalla, who wanted a Hungarian–Romanian alliance against Austria; but also found backing from László Teleki of the Resolution Party. With his parallel career as a lawyer, Babeș also helped the Mocionis win back 5 million florins from their Hungarian debtors, and was thereafter their trusted adviser.

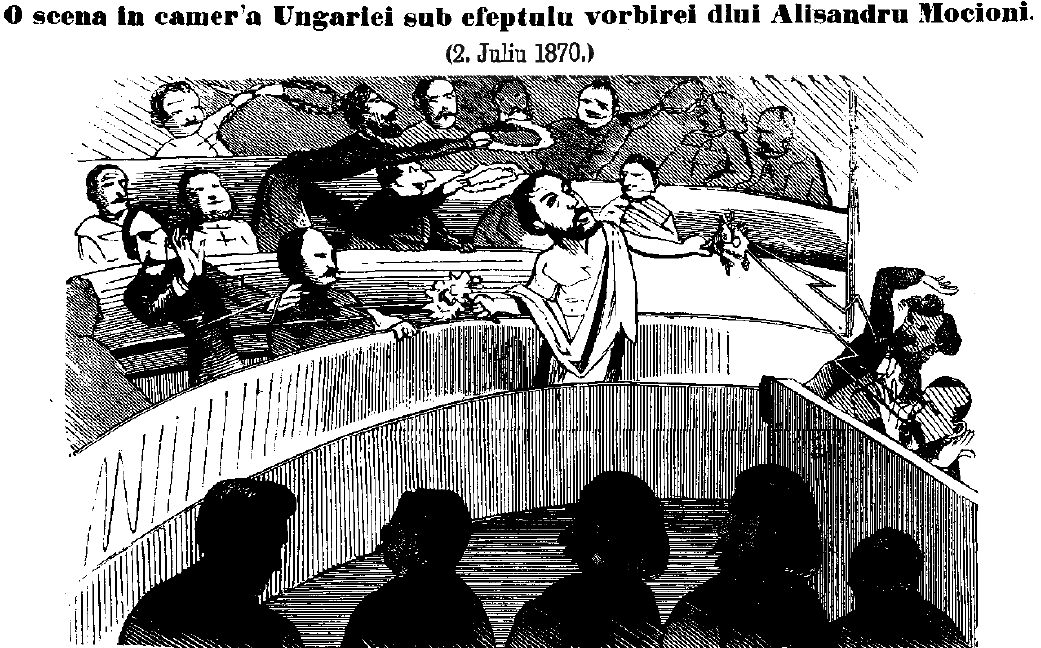
Alexandru Mocioni speaking in the Diet of Hungary, July 1870 cartoon in the Arad magazine Gura Satului

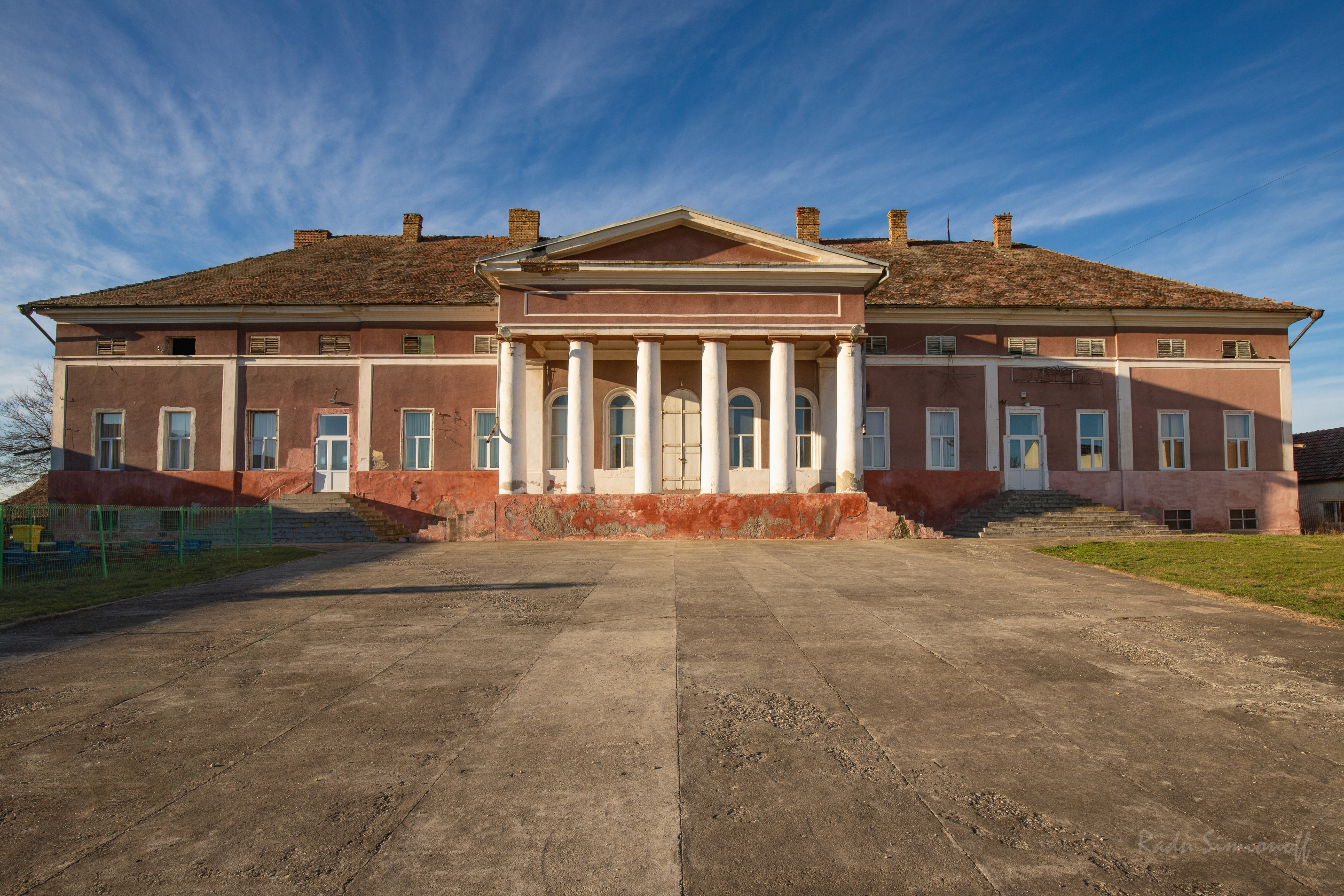
Mocioni's Foeni manor, 2021 photograph

At the beginning of 1865, Count Zichy, the Aulic Chancellor for Hungary, proposed to Anton and Andrei Mocioni that the Mocioni family be elevated to the rank of Counts of Hungary and inducted into the House of Magnates. Zichy tasked Vincențiu Babeș with delivering the news to them. Upon finding out, both brothers refused. Andrei told him, "Tell him to at least restore my peace of mind, if he cannot restore the trust that those above have stolen from me!", while Anton said: "Those above take us for wretches or fools; and little do they know that I would be ashamed to appear among people bearing the title of Count, so long as the miserable state of today's Romanian nation endures!"

Later in 1866, echoes of Mocioni's "Captaincy" project were discernible in the radical proposal advanced in the Diet by Babeș, Hodoșiu, and Sigismund Popoviciu: it recognized subjection to the Hungarian crown and government, but sought to redefine Hungary on the basis of ethnic federalism and corporatism. These efforts also failed. By September 1866, Mocioni and Babeș began speaking out in the Diet about the wish of Austrian Romanians to be united with the Principality of Romania.

The 1866–1867 interval was a great disappointment for all factions within the Romanian caucus: the return of Hungarian nationalism was unopposed following the Austro-Prussian War, and the Ausgleich of 1867 created Austria-Hungary, attaching most Romanian-inhabited to the Lands of the Crown of Saint Stephen. Mocioni was especially affected by the outcome. In the months following the new arrangement, Mocioni and Babeș participated in the drafting of another protest, also signed by the Diet's Serb, Slovak and "Ruthenian" deputies. The resolution, which demanded guarantees for the minorities, was supposed to be read by Mocioni. He stepped down to make way for a more popular deputy, the Serb Milán Manojlovics. Brother Anton Mocioni, alongside Serbs Stevan Branovački and Svetozar Miletić, continued to back the campaign, proposing to divide Hungary into six ethnic-based provinces.

Andrei Mocioni's dissapointment with the Austro-Hungarian compromise dissilusioned him from Habsburg loyalism. On 26 February 1867, Mocioni visited Lajos Kossuth - his former enemy - in Turin. In that meeting, he tried to forge an alliance between the radical anti-Habsburg Hungarian revolutionaries and the ethnic minorities of Hungary against th Habsburgs. He told Kossuth that "the Romanians of Transylvania and Hungary want an independent Romania. In order for that to happen, Hungary must also become independent from Austria and to stop being Vienna's pawn. An united Austro-Hungarian Empire will always want a weak Romania, while an independent Hungary, in order to have good relations with Romania, must give its ethnic Romanians national rights". The meeting had no results, as Kossuth did not return to Hungary. Historian Ioan Dimitrie Suciu argues that this meeting showed that Mocioni envisioned a future Romanian state that would also include Transylvania and Banat.

=== Final withdrawal ===
In 1869, Andrei Mocioni withdrew from all activism and returned to Foeni. That year, an analysis in Der Wanderer newspaper noted that "although Andrea Mocioni will forever remain the true leader" of the Romanian caucus, Alexandru was emerging as the tactician, and moderating the Romanians' resistance to Hungarian nationalism. Andrei also continued to be active as a sponsor and philanthropist, providing funds for Babeș's ethnological work, and for the Viennese Romanian newspaper, Albina. He and his brothers published and wrote for the latter sheet, alongside Babeș, while also financing pro-Romanian campaigns in the German-language journal Ost und West. Historian Andrei Sabin Faur describes Albina as the only explicitly liberal Romanian publication to appear in Austria-Hungary. This goal was stated in its first editorial, co-signed by the Mocionis, which promised that Albina would strive to be "as free and as liberal as is permitted by law and loyalty."

The elections of March 1869 ignited a conflict between Alexandru's "Mocionist party" and the pro-government Deák Party, represented locally by Béla Szende. As reported by Albina, the latter tried to win over Romanian voters using bribes, and used Uhlans to intimidate the opposition. By then, the various factions seeking to form a Romanian National Party had only managed to establish a Transylvanian caucus and a Banatian one. The latter, presided upon by Anton Mocioni, recognized Hungarian rule and sought to obtain Romanian rights within its jurisdiction. An 1872 report to his partisans also claimed that Andrei and the other Mocionis were "disgusted" and "demoralized" by the behavior of Romanian electors in Lugoj and Krassó, who acted as "proselytes of the [Hungarian] government".

Together with Visarion Roman and Partenie Cosma, the Mocioni brothers established in 1871 the Albina Bank of Sibiu, providing credit for Romanian businesses. At the time, Andrei Mocioni also provided funds in hopes of creating a Romanian regional theater, and became godfather of Andrei, the child of actors Mihail and Matilda Pascaly. The family as a whole provided a scholarship fund for disadvantaged children, managed by Babeș. Noted recipients include writer Gruia Liuba Murgu, biologist Victor Babeș, and lawyer Coriolan Brediceanu. The former deputy and the Hungarian post had an unsolved dispute about the creation of a Foeni post office, which the officials viewed as too costly. Mocioni took the postmaster examination and, at his own expense, erected a building which, with its mahogany furniture and silver inkwells, was recognized as "the most elegant post office".

Mocioni was still pressed by his friends to make a return to politics. He refused on principle, but allowed for a theoretical possibility: "I shall no longer fight and sacrifice myself to the four winds, but will patiently wait for a national regeneration to begin, if ever." In December 1875, he was selected a representative for the "national church congress" by the voters of Facsád (Făget), but turned down the office, which went to Constantin Rădulescu. A local tradition, recorded in 1905 by the newspaper Tribuna, noted that, by then, he and his Serb wife were detested by the local Romanians, who once attacked the manor and shattered its windows. According to a notice in the Arad Orthodox paper Biseric'a si Scóla, Mocioni was also driven away from religious affairs after "a mean gossiper libeled him, out of the blue and without a shred of truthfulness".

Mocioni's health was failing, and for this reason he never attended any session of the Romanian Academy. From 1879, Mocioni's disease worsened, and, once bedridden, he was taken to Temeschwar (now officially Temesvár) to be under specialist care. Mocioni died on May 5 (April 23), 1880. Although some sources give his death place as Foeni, contemporary reports have it that he died in Temeschwar, after having lapsed into a brief coma, and while looked after by his wife Laura. Their marriage had produced no heirs.

== Legacy ==
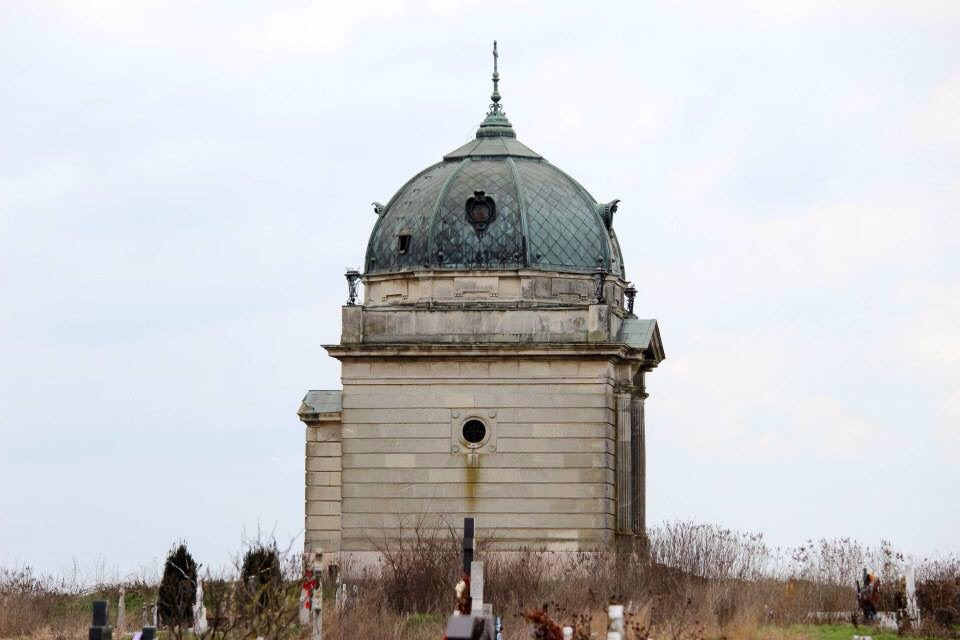
Mocioni crypt in Foeni, 2015 photograph

Mocioni's body was taken to Foeni for an Orthodox burial at the common Serb–Romanian church, which he and his wife had furnished. Laura inherited all his wealth, which sparked a Mocioni family feud. Already a licensed postal worker, she continued Mocioni's work as a postmaster. She died on the estate in August 1892, aged 53, and was buried at his side. In her late years, she had carried on with Mocioni philanthropy work, but only servicing the local Serb community and punishing Romanian ingratitude. According to Tribuna, the "new generation" of Romanians, "more enlightened than the earlier one", was expressing shame and regret for having alienated her.

The family's involvement in Hungarian conservative politics were being reexamined in the 1890s by a new generation of radicals, who argued that "Mocionism" was a sample of "Magyarophilia". By then, a scandal had erupted over Andrei Mocioni's remains. The church remained a property of the Karlovci Patriarchy, which in 1900 refused to hand over the body for reburial in the Mocioni mausoleum. It cited texts which condemned the separation in death of husband and wife, but the Romanian press suspected that such resistance was proof of "intolerant" Serb nationalism. A separation was eventually made, and Andrei was reburied in the new location.

The various Mocioni estates went to brothers Alexandru and Eugen. Some were inherited by Eugen's sons, before passing to Ecaterina Mocioni and her husband, Jenő, Count Teleki; others went to the Bukovinian baron Ioan Mocsony-Stârcea, who was Alexandru's adoptive son. The core manor at Foeni was nevertheless inherited by the Csávossy counts, while his horses continued to be bred by the Austrians Jakob Haas and Ludwig Deutsch. The property was pillaged by peasants during the revolutionary events which marked the collapse of Austria-Hungary in 1918. According to one Romanian account, this incident provided the Hungarian Royal Gendarmerie with an excuse to murder Romanians.

Most other assets were kept by the surviving family following the establishment of Greater Romania, when Anton Jr bought back the Foeni mansion, hoping to turn it into a cultural club. According to historian Vicențiu Bugariu, by 1930 Andrei Mocioni was already forgotten, a victim of "ignorance and indifference". This trend was censured by the Banat politician Sever Bocu. Although a critic of "Mocionist" conservatism in Austria-Hungary, during the interwar he became noted for his work to preserve and shed light on the family's contribution as a "moral dynasty". Bocu wrote Andrei Mocioni's profile as a study in national pedagogy, declaring that any Banatian unaware of the Mocionis' role "is a Banatian in name only". Mocioni, or any other of his relatives, is also mentioned in the dialectical Banatian poetry of the interwar. Samples include Gheorghe Gârda's Că tăt Bănatu-i fruncea! ("And Yet the Banat Is Tops") and Cassian R. Munteanu's Vicejî noștri ("Our Braves").

With the death of Anton Jr in 1943, the direct Mocioni lineage was extinguished; however, interest in the family was still kept alive by Bocu's nephew, the scholar Ion D. Suciu. In the 1950s, the estates were subject to nationalization under the communist regime, which turned the Foeni complex into a public bathhouse, and then into a storage room for chemicals. Following the Romanian Revolution of 1989, the mansion was re-purposed as a cultural club and mainly functioned as a disco, before being taken over by the local town hall. The communist and post-communist periods saw the Mocioni inheritance falling into disrepair, and the deposited collections were still being looted in 2003. In the latter period, busts of Andrei and Alexandru Mocioni were installed in Timișoara's Scudier Park.
