= 1872 Hungarian parliamentary election =

- 12 June – 9 July 1872

All 413 seats in the Diet 207 seats needed for a majority
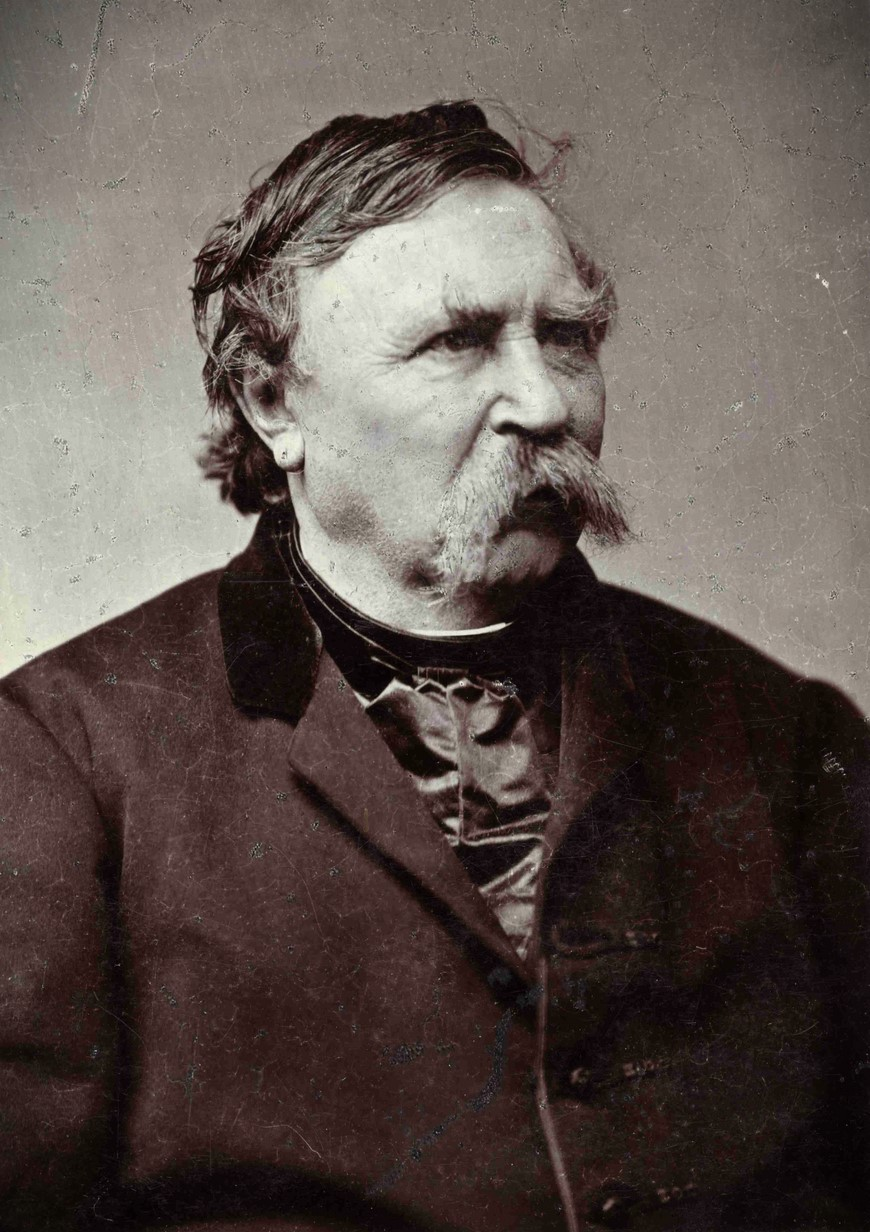

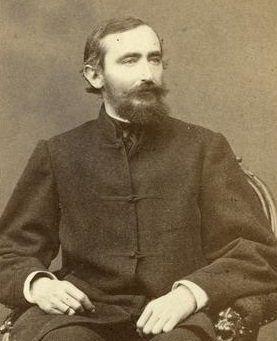

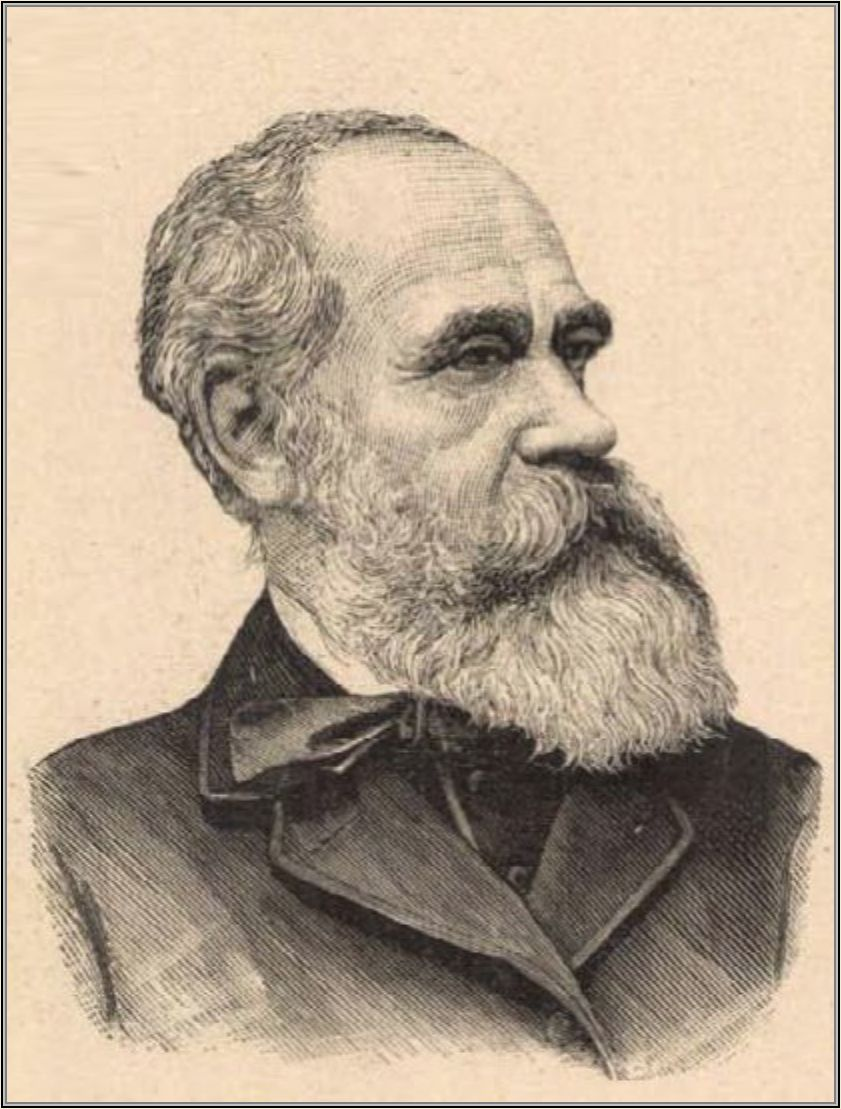
	First party	Second party	Third party
Leader	Ferenc Deák	Kálmán Tisza	József Madarász
Party	DP	BK	1848P
Seats won	252 / 413	110 / 413	37 / 413
Seat change	▲6	▼2	▲1
Percentage	61.02%	26.63%	8.96%
Prime Minister before election
Menyhért Lónyay
DP
Prime Minister after election
Menyhért Lónyay
DP

Parliamentary elections were held in Hungary between 12 June and 9 July 1872. Count Menyhért Lónyay, appointed Prime Minister on 14 November 1871. He wanted to reform the suffrage in order to weaken the opposition. However, the ruling party was strained by internal conflicts, which was a coalition of liberals, conservatives, big capitalists, small landowners and intellectuals. The left side opposed the reform by using obstruction, taking advantage of the fact that there was no time limit for a parliamentary speech. At the request of the Prime Minister, King Franz Joseph I brought the elections forward because they could not accept the suffrage reform. The ruling party had to mobilize large financial resources to win the election, because the wealthier opposition candidates could run more expensive campaigns. Those who left the ruling party and the Left Centre formed the Reform Party in January. The new parliament convened on September 3, 1872.

== Parties and leaders ==
Party	Leader
Deák Party (DP)	Ferenc Deák
Left Centre (BK)	Kálmán Tisza
Party of 1848 (1848P)	József Madarász
Reform Party (RP)	Ede Károlyi
National Party of Romanians in Hungary (PNRBU)	Alexandru Mocioni
Serbian People's Liberal Party (SNSS)	Svetozar Miletić
National Party of Romanians in Transylvania (PNRT)	Ilie Macelaru

== Electoral system ==
The elections were based on property, income and education census. Landowners with a ¼ plot of land (between 2.5 – 6.5 ha) or with 100 Ft income, merchants with their own businesses, craftsmen masters and factory owners. In the Royal free cities houses or landowners worth 300 Fts and the citizens. In Transylvania, scientists, surgeons, engineers, teachers, academic artists, members of the Hungarian Academy of Sciences, pharmacists and clergymen could also vote in all cities. In the Transylvanian counties, in Székely Land and Țara Făgărașului (Fogarasföld), those paying the 8 Ft tax and residents of villages consisting of at least 100 households were eligible to vote. 20 years older men were eligible to vote and 24 years older men could be elected. Women had no right for the participation. The elections were held exclusively in single-member district by open voting.

== Results ==
Party	Seats	+/–
Deák Party	252	+6
Left Centre	110	-2
Party of 1848	37	+1
Reform Party	5	New
National Party of Romanians in Hungary	5	-5
Serbian People's Liberal Party	3	+1
National Party of Romanians in Transylvania	1	0
Total	413	–
Source: Ballabás-Pap-Pál

== Aftermath ==
After the elections, the relationship between Count Menyhért Lónyay and the opposition leader Kálmán Tisza became strained, and eventually the Deák Party turned against the prime minister, who resigned on November 30, 1872. The filling of the mandates in the two constituencies of Țara Făgărașului (Fogarasföld) was delayed by 4 months. The Reform Party remained a short-lived party, because it dissolved on December 17, 1873.
