= Adolf Dobriansky =

Rusyn social activist

- Адолф Добряньскый
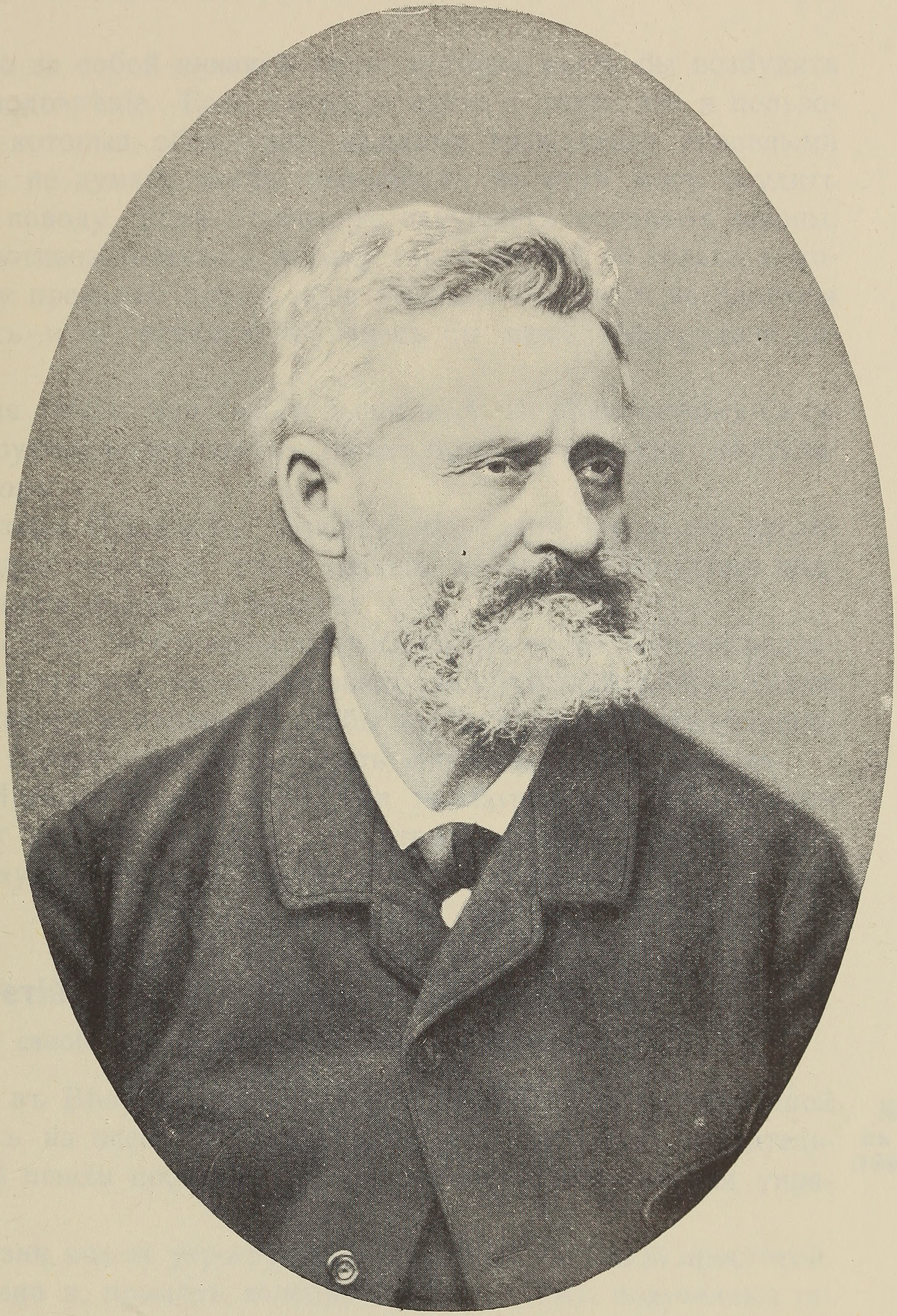
- Dobriansky in Vienna, 1883
- Born: December 19, 1817; Rudlov, Austria-Hungary (now Slovakia)
- Died: March 19, 1901; Innsbruck, Austria-Hungary (now Austria)
- Education: Bergakademie Schemnitz Banská Štiavnica, Slovakia
- Organizations: Society of St. John the Baptist, founder; Society of St. Basil the Great, founder; Matice Slovenska, member; Society of Orthodox Bohemians, member
- Known for: Rusyn activism, politics, literature
- Movement: Galician Russophilia
- Awards: Order of St. Vladimir, 4th degree (1849) Order of St. Anna, 3rd degree (1849) Order of the Iron Crown, 3rd degree (1857) Order of St. Anna, 3rd degree (1862)

Adolf Dobriansky (German: Adolf Ritter von Sacsurov Dobrzanski, Rusyn: Адолф Добряньскый, Ukrainian: Добрянський Адольф Іванович; 19 December 1817 – 19 March 1901) was a public figure and leader of the Carpatho-Rusyn movement in Subcarpathian Rus', lawyer and writer.

Dobriansky was a proponent of the return of Greek Catholics to Orthodoxy and author of numerous works devoted to the history, ethnography, religious and political situation of Carpathian Rus'. He was also a recognized leader of the Carpatho-Rusyn movement, and an activist for the cultural, linguistic and ethnic unification of Rusyns of Austria-Hungary with ethnic Russians of Russia.

Dobriansky's grandchildren include linguist G. J. Gerovsky, politician A. J. Gerovsky, and artist I. E. Grabar and lawyer V. E. Grabar.

== Youth and education ==
Dobriansky was born in Rudlov, Slovakia to I. I. Dobriansky, a Greek Catholic priest (as was his grandfather) and Charlotte Andreyevna, née Sepeshazi, daughter of the mayor of Levoča.

The Dobrianskys were an old noble family, which, according to Adolf's autobiographical memoirs, stretched back to the Orthodox Duke Tomov Sovu, who came to Hungary in the 10th century with Hungarian Prince Géza. The Dobrianskys were most likely recognized as nobles in 1445 by Mayor Kendes of the Makovica estate, and their status was confirmed by the Maramarosh Legislative Chamber in 1763.

Both parents were educated people; his mother spoke German, Hungarian, French and knew Latin, Ukrainian and Church Slavonic. He learned to read and write Russian at home; at the age of five he was sent to his grandmother in Levoča to learn German. There he began attending the gymnasium, of which he had completed two years by 1828. He then completed his third year in Rožňava, where he learned Hungarian. He completed his fourth and fifth year in Miskolc, where he learned the basics of the Byzantine rite. In his sixth and final year he studied again in Levoča, where his father (after transferring from Rudlov) was a parish priest in nearby Závadka.

He received his higher education in Košice at the faculty of philosophy and in Eger, Hungary at the faculty of law. It was during this time that his views on the world, religion, society, and politics formed. Religiously, he drew closer to Orthodoxy and as a student he became a spiritual leader among students who embraced Slavophilia. After a short legal practice, he entered the Academy of Mining and Forestry in Banská Štiavnica, where he studied mining administration and forestry for four years. There he became acquainted with Galicians, Muscovites, and other Slavs who came there to study.

== Civil service ==
In 1840 Dobriansky was appointed as a trainee to Windschacht (now Štiavnické Bane), two years later he was appointed to kunst offizier, 'craft officer'. After four years, he was rewarded for his outstanding service and sent to Vienna, Austria. Here, under the guidance of the best engineers, he was able to improve his knowledge in the construction workshops of the Vienna-Glockenberg Railway. In 1847, he was sent to Bohemia, where he opened stone and coal mines and was again appointed to kunst offizier in Brandýs. While in Bohemia, he became acquainted with Václav Hanko, Karel Havlíček Borovský, František Palacký, František Rieger and many other Pan-Slavists.

In March 1848 he was commissioned to return to Hungary, where he was introduced to Minister of Finance Lajos Kossuth May and then travelled to the Štiavnické Bane, where his wife Eleonóra Osipovna (née Miľvjus) lived with their children. There he was enthusiastically welcomed by the local Slovaks. He ran in the elections to the Hungarian Parliament, but the election results were annulled and Erich Šemberi (Šemberg) became minister.

When the Hungarian Revolution broke out that spring, Dobriansky's life soon came into danger. He fled to Spiš and hid with his father, then with his son-in-law, Janický M. Gerovsky, in Malcov until the Austrian army under Count Šlik arrived. Then he moved to Prešov, where he began collecting signatures for a petition to Emperor Franz Joseph for the annexation of so-called "Uhro-Rus'" (or Hungarian Rus'; also known as Carpathian Rus') by the Kingdom of Galicia and Lodomeria, which would free the Subcarpathian population from Hungarian domination. As the situation changed in Hungary, General Šlika was forced to retreat and Dobriansky was captured by the Hanoverians in early 1849, after which he travelled to Galicia, stopping in Tulic, where his son Miroslav was born, before moving on to Przemyśl.

Later, Dobriansky travelled to Lviv, where he stayed in the archbishopric near St. George's Cathedral. In Lviv he took an active part in the Galician-Russian national movement, becoming acquainted with Kuzemsky, Malinovsky, Lotocky, Velichkovsky, Petrushevich, Zubrysky, among others. He took part in the work of the "Main Russian Council" and attended its meetings as a deputy. Their aim was to once again present a request to the Galician Deputy-Count for the annexation of Uhro-Rus' by the Kingdom of Galicia and Lodomeria. Dobriansky then traveled to Vienna for an answer, met with the Deputy Minister of the Interior, and was told that the union was against public interest.

On May 19, 1849, Dobriansky was appointed civilian commissar to the Russian army of Franz Zichy, which was then assigned to allied Austria to suppress the Hungarian uprising. On June 13, Dobriansky transferred to the 3rd detachment under General Friedrich von Rüdiger. He later took part in the battles of Váci and Debrecen, took prisoners at Vilagos, and was present for the reception of a Hungarian military delegation in the village of Artande by Rüdiger, which presented a petition on behalf of the whole Hungarian army for the annexation of Hungary to Russia. Dobriansky later received several decorations from Russian Count Ivan Paskevich: the Order of St. Vladimir of the 4th degree, the Order of St. Anna of the 3rd degree and also a medal "for the reconciliation of Hungary with Transylvania".

After the suppression of the uprising, Dobriansky served for some time as a high commissioner in Bács-Bodrog County, but had to leave this job due to a serious illness. After his recovery, he travelled to Vienna with several Carpatho-Rusyn patriots. The delegation, authorized by Bishop Josip Gaganec, was received by Emperor Franz Joseph. It presented another request for the annexation of Uhro-Rus' to Galicia. This request was also rejected, but shortly afterwards Uzhhorod County was formed, in which several Rusyns were assigned to administrative posts. Dobriansky then accepted the post of second district reporter (clerk) and the office of governor in Uzhhorod. This enabled him to devote himself more significantly to the national revival of Uhro-Rus'. Under his direction, Russian officials were appointed, Russian was used in negotiations and the streets were covered with Russian signs. This was negatively received by Hungarians in the region, and seen as seeking to de-Hungarianize and assimilate the Rusyns. Within five months, Dobriansky was withdrawn by order of the commander of the Košice Military District, General Johann Bordolo von Boreo, to Saris as a royal commissioner to investigate the crimes of the local mayor and officials. He was later appointed as an informer in various regions: in 1851 secretary 1st class at the Hungarian deputy, then in 1853 a member of the deputy council in Veliki Varadin and subsequently transferred to the same position in Budapest. He was honoured by the government for his performance of these tasks, and in 1857 he was awarded the Order of the Iron Crown of the 3rd degree, as well as a knighthood with the right to add the nobiliary particle Sačurov to his surname, (after the name of the village near Rudlov, which he had bought).

In 1859, Dobriansky was elected a corresponding member of the Royal Institute for his services in the chemical and geological exploration of mineral springs. In 1861, he was on a review of the prison in Mukachevo. In the same year he took part in the elections to the Hungarian Diet, became a deputy, but the Hungarians took care to annul the elections. He was also elected in the re-election, but these results too were annulled. In 1862, he received the Order of St. Anna of the 2nd degree on the occasion of the celebration of the 1000th anniversary of Russia, and in 1863 he was awarded the rank of Austrian Counsellor. In the same year he also became a member of the Matice Slovenska, and contributed to the magazine Slovenské Noviny. Along with Alexander Dukhnovych, Dobriansky participated in the organization and 1863 foundation of the Society of St. John the Baptist in Prešov and the 1864 foundation of the literary Society of St. Basil the Great in Uzhhorod—both of which contributed to the dissemination of literature focused on spiritual and cultural enlightenment.

In 1864 Dobriansky was also appointed by imperial decree as an advisor to the Hungarian Court Chancellery in Vienna (the highest governing body in Hungary until 1867). He eventually became a member of the Hungarian Diet in 1865 and served until 1868 as a politician, economist and speaker, making proposals for the development of local government, tax reforms and national self-determination. In 1867 he retired from government service and devoted himself fully to the national revival of Carpathian Rus, settling on his property.

== Cultural, educational, and national activities ==
Back home, Dobriansky devoted much time to educational, literary, and organizational work. He was head of the Order of St. Basil the Great, which supported the Transcarpathian, Galician and Slovak presses, and paid great attention to church issues. In 1868, he formulated a development plan for the Uhro-Rusyn Church, and announced the plan along with two other members of the Diet. For the Hungarians, this plan was unacceptable; they began to advocate the autonomy of the entire Hungarian Catholic Church, instead of only the Uhro-Rusyn Uniate Church. In response to Hungarian criticisms, Dobriansky proposed the election of a special Council for the Uhro-Rusyn Church at the Synod of 1869, where Dobriansky represented Zemplín County. However, Bishop Pankovič of Mukachevo and the Hungarian majority at the Council adopted a resolution for full autonomy of the Hungarian Catholic Church. To protest, Dobriansky left the council and wrote a letter voicing his disagreement with the decision of the participants. As a result, support by many leaders of the Uhro-Rusyn and Romanian churches prevented the results of the council's deliberations from being realized.

Dobriansky, however, had made new enemies who were now joined by the Hungarian priesthood. In 1871, he was attacked by Hungarian nationalists in Uzhhorod, though the victim was his son, Miroslav, who suffered serious injuries. Dobriansky could no longer openly attend Hungarian meetings nor take part in Russian meetings, which without his leadership had declined considerably. He criticized the emerging Ukrainophile faction in the 1870s for the damage it was doing to the "Russian" cause; he also criticized Russophiles for inaction. In 1875, he visited Russia and several large cities for several months, meeting with notable Russian thinkers Konstantin Pobedonostsev, Mikhail Katkov, I.S. Aksanov, Ivan Petrovich Kornilov, Sergey Solovyov, as well as others; also being received by Tsar Aleksandr III.

In the autumn of 1881, Adolf Dobriansky, at the request of the leaders of the Galician-Russian movement, left his property in Čertižné for Lviv. There he led the Galician-Ruthenian struggle for national self-determination, which was suppressed in every possible way by the Poles controlling the region. He stayed with his son-in-law J.M. Gerovsky, a lawyer and Rusyn activist. He willingly joined the struggle and was elected chairman of the "Russian Casino" society, which organized meetings of the Galicians. He tried to create ties among the Galician patriots, to minimize the contradictions between Russophiles and Ukrainophiles, to unite all Rusyns for common goals. However, the situation in the Empire had already changed by that time; Austria, which had previously preferred the Russophiles, now instead supported the Ukrainization of Galicia. As such, Dobriansky's activity was seen as undesirable. The Poles in particular saw him as a threat, which resulted in legal proceedings being brought against his daughter, Olga Grabar, and several other Russian dignitaries in 1882. After the trial, at which he was acquitted, Dobriansky was forced to move to Vienna.

In Vienna, Dobriansky was almost continuously engaged in literary activity. In the period from 1882 to 1887, several of his works on the history of "Galician Rus'", Uhro-Rus', church affairs, ethnography, and linguistics were published. In 1883, he appealed to the pope in the matter of the defense of I.G. Naumovich, who had been accused of schism during the trial of his daughter. In 1885, the Russian publicist P.F. Levdik published his memorandum On the Present Religio-Political Attitudes of Austro-Hungarian Russia in Moscow, which consisted of replies to letters from Galician-Rusyn leaders on the role of the Russian press in Austria. Dobriansky paid much attention to Pan-Slavism, developing the ideas of a unified Slavic language (i.e. Interslavic). He participated in the organization and operation of Slavic newspapers such as Parlamentar, Velehrad, and Slavic World, as well as societies such as the Society of Orthodox Bohemians.

In 1887, when his daughter and son-in-law moved to Tyrol with his wife and children, he followed them to Innsbruck. He lived there until the end of his life, working as a leader of the local Slavic youth, and wrote several works on ecclesiastical and social Slavic themes and on the themes of socio-political and ecclesiastical life in contemporary Russia, notably in the works The Fruits of the Teachings of Count L. N. Tolstoy and Faith and Reason.

Adolf Dobriansky died on 6 March [O.S. 19 March] 1901 in Innsbruck (Austria-Hungary), after a long illness. He was buried in Čertižne near Medzilaborce in eastern Slovakia on 13 March [O.S. 26 March] with a large congregation. 12 priests officiated at the funeral ceremony.

== Impact and legacy ==
The Slovak newspaper Sokol in 1862 wrote about Adolf Dobriansky: "He is a man of enormous energy and comprehensive knowledge. He worked a lot on the extension of railways. The counties where he worked were turning into a rich, prosperous country. For his work, the emperor knighted him. He worked among the Hungarians and showed the highest achievements in his work to show the virtues of the non-Hungarian peoples as a Ruthenian. He worked also among the Slovaks, and they had only words of the greatest appreciation and gratitude for Dobriansky."

The Slovak writer Viliam Pauliny-Tóth wrote about him: "As for his character, he is a good soul, honest, Slavic, a true Christian who faithfully observes all the rules of his Greek Catholic Church. He is fearless in spirit, bright and cheerful, he likes and works tirelessly, he is not afraid of difficulties and dangers.... Love and peace live in his house, there he is the happiest and most blissful in the circle of his family... Protect him, O God, may he live to see the realization of the desires and wishes of his life."

Fluent in nine languages (Hungarian, German, English, French, Greek, Latin, Italian, Slovak and Russian), his articles were published in Moscow, Paris, Budapest, Vienna, and other cities. He was a great orator and believed deeply in God. He taught people to till the soil, plant and graft trees, and bee-keep. He took care of the school education of the peasants' children. In his will, he ordered that his property be divided equally among the inhabitants of Certižné.

=== Family ===
Adolf Dobriansky was the head of a large family; practically all his children and grandchildren were well-known personalities of the Rusyn movement. His eldest daughter Olga married the politician Emanuel Ivanovich Grabar and gave birth to two sons - the artist and art historian Igor and the lawyer Vladimir. His daughter Olena married the linguist Anton Semionovich Budilov; from this marriage were born a son, Boris, a philologist, and a daughter, Lydia, who became the wife of the Carpatho-Rusyn politician Julian Mikhailovich Gerovsky; of their children, the philologist Georgy and the politician Oleksii became famous as Russian activists. Carpatho-Rusyn leaders also married his daughters Irina (to P. J. Gomichko) and Vira (to I. P. Prodan). In addition, he had three sons - Volodymyr, Miroslav and Boris. In 2006, a relative of Adolf Dobriansky - Milan Dobransky - was elected mayor of Rudlov.

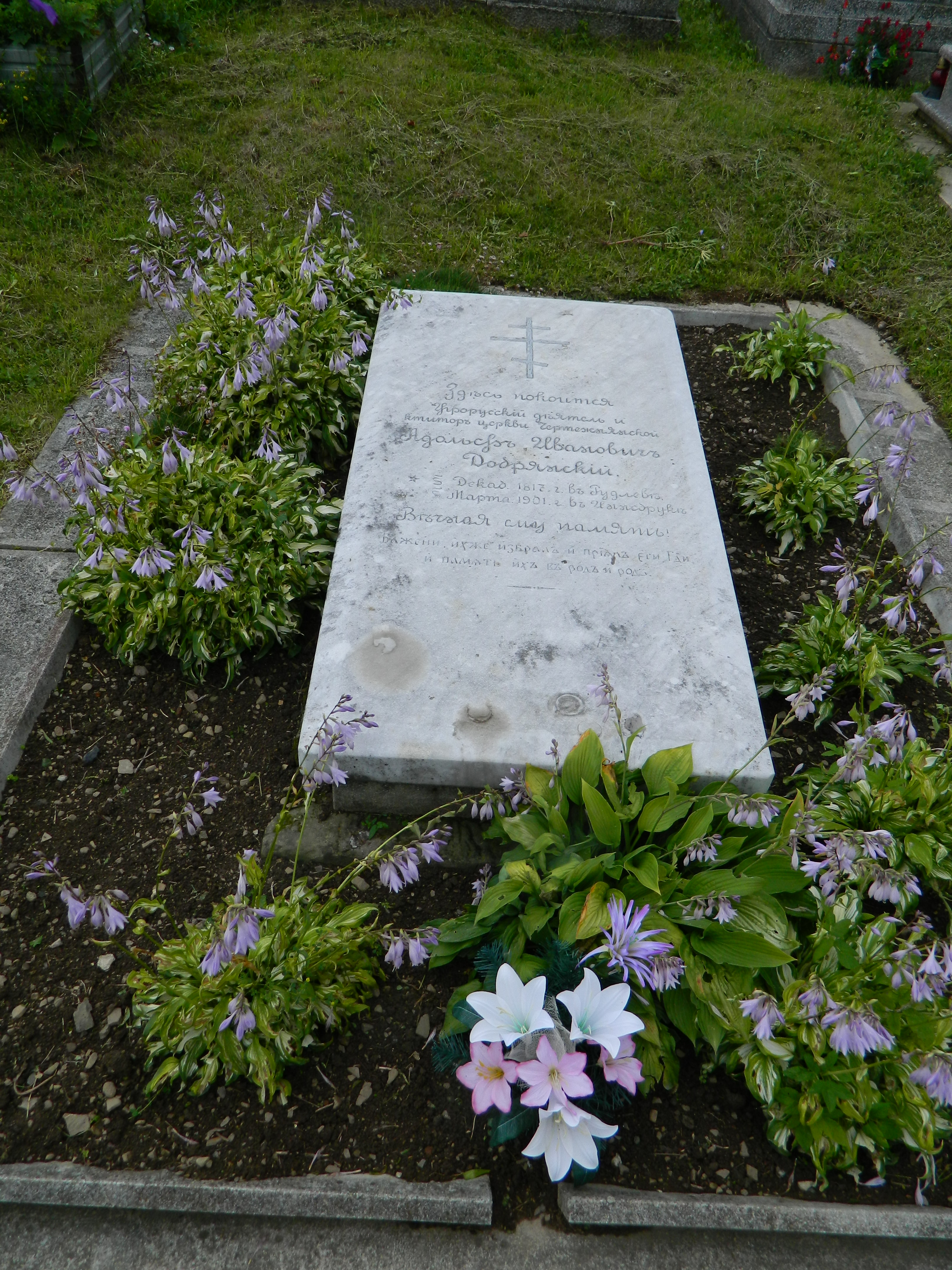
Grave of Adolf Dobriansky in the village of Čertižné, Slovakia

== Major works ==
- Draft Political Programme for Austrian Rus' (1871) - points out the need for autonomy for the whole of Austrian Rus' and its transformation into a single entity of the Austrian Federal Empire. The national cultural unity of the Russian nation cannot be broken even by the separatist activities of the Ukrainoman party, which, in the author's opinion, with the impossibility of the resurrection of Ukraine in the Austrian monarchy, "should work in solidarity with 'all our intelligentsia'."
- Patriotic Letters (1873) - in a series of publications published in the Galician-Russian newspaper Slovo ('Word') Dobriansky critically examines the phenomenon of Ukrainophilia. He describes "Russian" Ukrainophillia not as a national but a social movement generated by the discontent of the "Little Russian" Cossacks with serfdom. With the abolition of serfdom, he believed, this issue would be exhausted and the unity of the Russian people could be restored. Dobriansky considered the historical, linguistic and especially political constructions of the "Ukrajinomanov" to be absurd and harmful.
- For the western borders of Subcarpathian Rus, from the time of St. Vladimir (1880) - Dobriansky argues with reference to the early chronicle and ethnographic data that "Old Rus' stretched as far as Cracow, which was built in on the foundations of ancient Rus'. Though Greek Catholic himself, he consistently pursued a policy aimed at returning Uniates to the Orthodoxy. As part of this strategy, he asserted the autonomy of "Carpatho-Russian" Greek Catholics from the diocesan authorities of Hungary and defended the Church's Slavic language and Eastern Christian tradition. Dobriansky devoted his writings "Reply of the Hungarian-Russian Clergy of the Presov Eparchy to their Eparch" (1881) and "Appeal to the Pope on behalf of the Uhro-Russian Clergy of the Presov Eparchy with the question about the wearing of beards by Uniate priests" (1881) to these issues.
- Appeal of I.G. Naumovich (1883) - an attempt to protect excommunicated Father I. Naumovich from the Roman Catholic Church, for trying to foment "schism". He contrasts the decline of the Halych-Russian Greek Catholic Church, which he sees as rooted in Romanization, with the prosperous state of the Orthodox Church.
- On the Present Religio-Political Positions of Hungarian Rus' (1885) - In this work Dobriansky directly advises his countrymen not to wait for help from Rome. He argued that with the continuation of the policy of Latinisation, the return of Galicia and Hungarian Rus' would be inevitable, and he openly called for this movement. This book was banned in Austria.
- The Naming of the Austro-Hungarian Russians (1885) - In this work, Dobriansky, on the basis of linguistic, philological and historical analysis, considers the terms "Rusyn", "Ruthenian", "Rus'", and "Russian" to be identical. This polemical work stood against official Austro-Ukrainian propaganda, which claimed that the names "Rusyn" and "Ruthenian" applied only to the "Little Russians" Galicia and Subcarpathian Rus', and "Russian" only to the "Great Russians" of the Russian Empire. Dobriansky showed the lack of seriousness of these accusations, and again declared the ethnic, linguistic and national-cultural unity of all "Russian" nationalities.
- On the feast day of St. Martyr Demetrius (1886) - Dobriansky is also the author of this important church-political manifesto, in which he claims that St. Methodius was the archbishop of the autocephalous Slavic Church, but after his death the German clergy and the Moravian government, which supported him, prevented the appointment of a successor to Methodius, who was to be Ahapon Zdatny. The Hungarian Church until the end of the 12th century was also Orthodox; union was only accepted at the end of the 12th century, during the reign of Béla the Third. This means that the Orthodox Church is indigenous to the whole Slavic world, to the whole of Eastern and even Central Europe, and Catholicism was introduced by German rule. Dobriansky proposed the creation of a common Slavic federation in the following form: the Slavic states would join Russia on federal principles.

=== Theological works ===
Dobriansky was a staunch defender of Slavophiles in Galicia and Uhro-Rus' and of political leaders such as Konstantin Pobedonostsev. At their request, he took a principled stand against more progressive western "Russians" and against supporters church reformation. He debated them in Galicia in the following works:

- Calendar Questions in Rus' and the West (1894) - Dobriansky exclaims the accuracy of the supporters of the Julian calendar based on a detailed examination in the context of church history. He argues that the Julian calendar is "simple, easy, and practical, and still remains unsurpassed." In his view, the Roman Church can only be freed from the papal yoke by returning to the sound traditional foundations of Christ's Church, that is, through reunion with the Orthodox Church.
- The Fruits of Count Tolstoy's Teaching (1896)
- A Condemnation of the Planned Reform of the Russian Church Administration by the Russian Liberals of Our Time to the Orthodox People of Galicia (1899) - Dobriansky discussed the critics of N. Durnov and the activities of the Holy Synod and the Rusyn theological seminaries. He defended the authority of the Holy Governing Synod over the Orthodox Rusyn Church, opposed anti-church campaigns, and discussed the dangers of both Catholic and Protestant propaganda. In particular, he portrayed the danger of spreading "the most indifferent attitude towards religion, which has long been known in Western Europe under the name of 'non-confessionalism or infidelity'".
