= 1865 Hungarian parliamentary election =

- 10 November–11 December 1865

All 409 seats in the Diet 205 seats needed for a majority
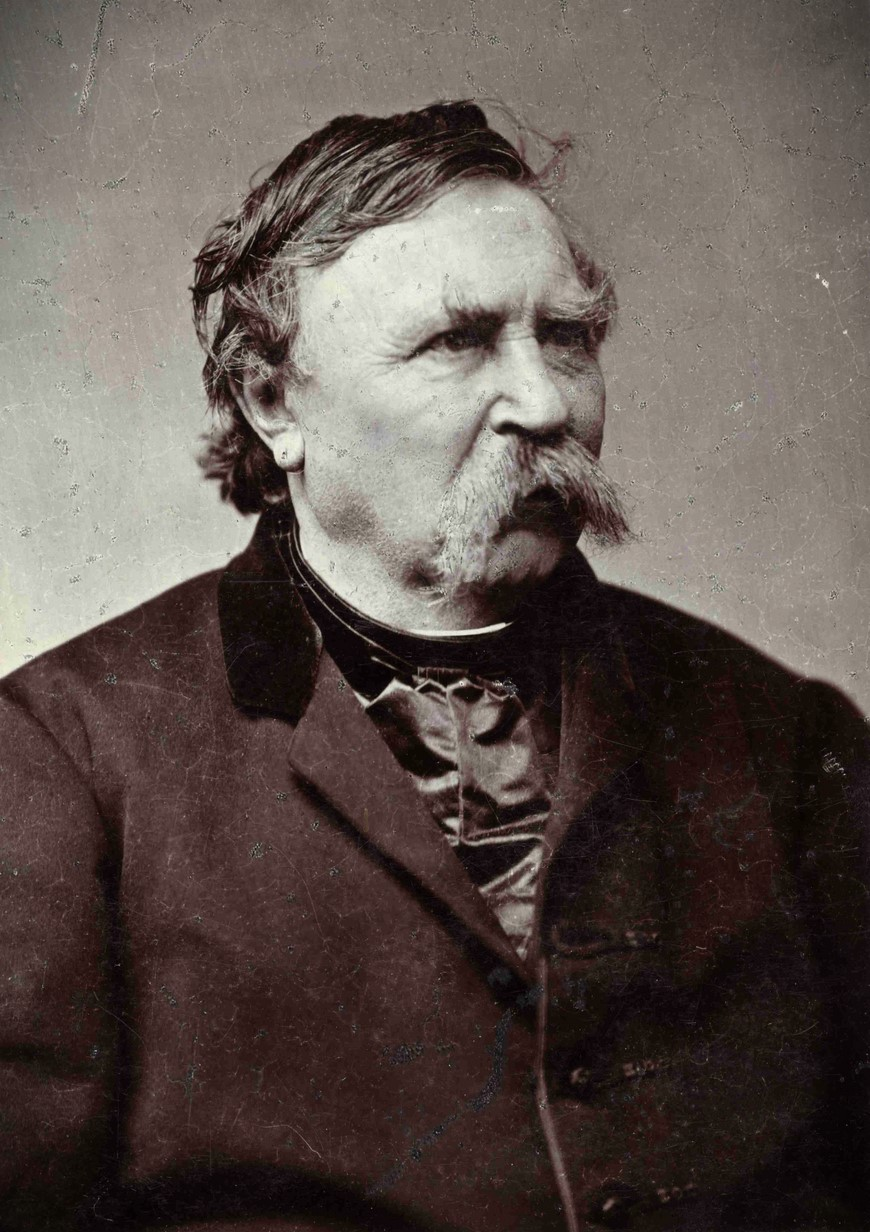

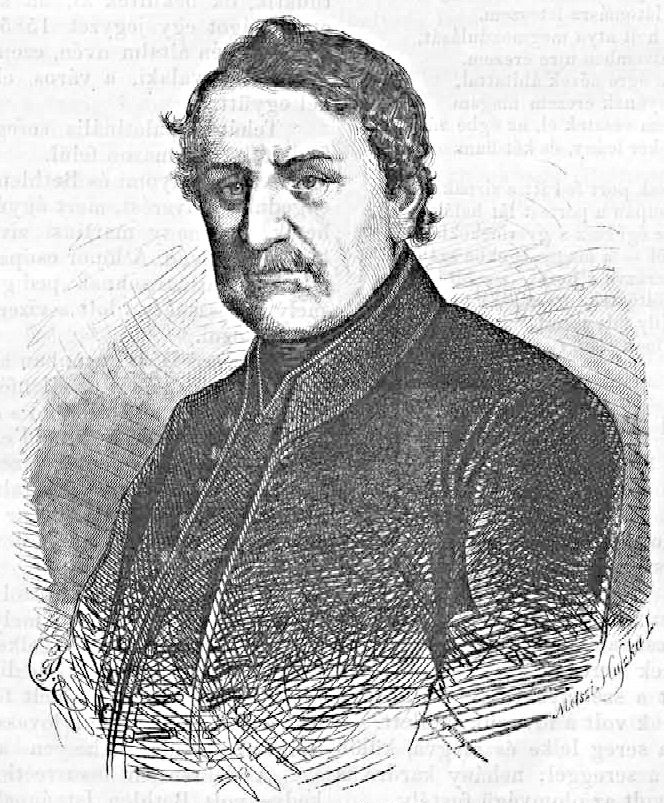

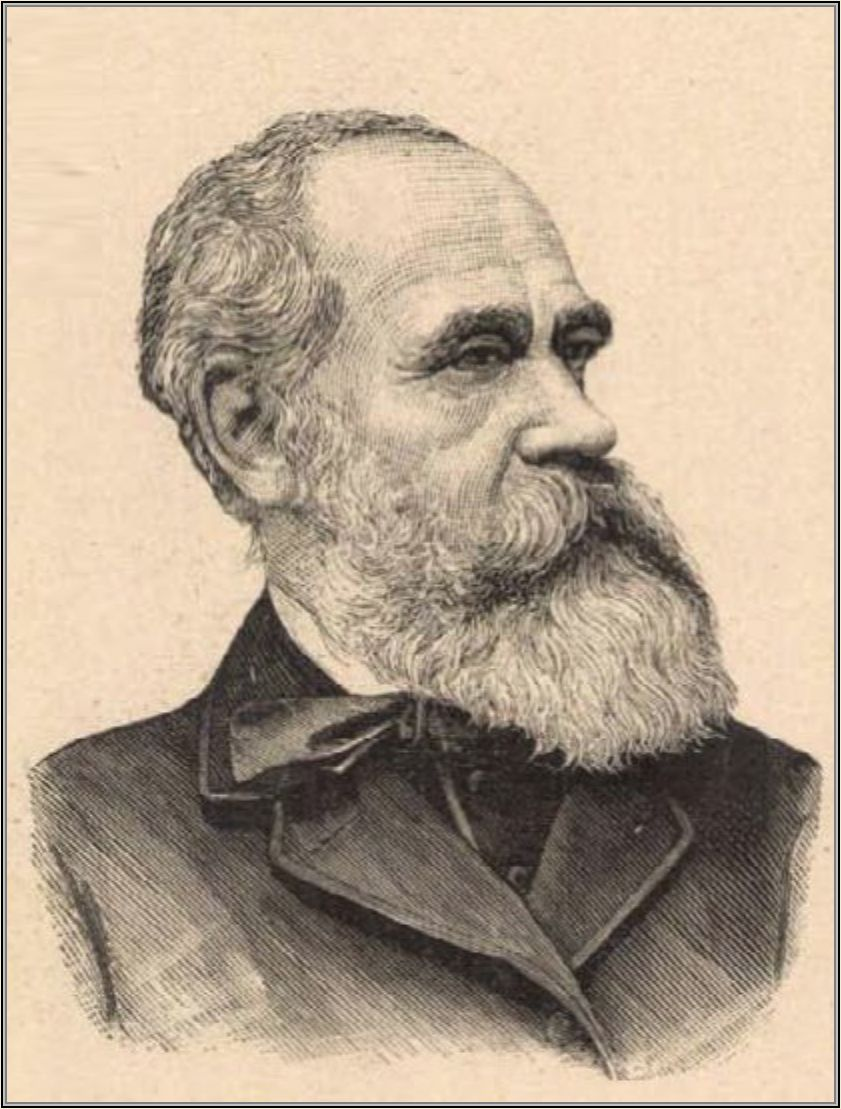
	First party	Second party	Third party
Leader	Ferenc Deák	Kálmán Ghyczy	József Madarász
Party	DP	BK	SZB
Seats won	268 / 409	92 / 409	21 / 409
Seat change	New	New	New
Percentage	65.53%	22.49%	5.13%

Parliamentary elections were held in the Kingdom of Hungary and in the Grand Principality of Transylvania between 10 November and 11 December 1865. In Hungary, instead of the National Assembly, associations were the temporary arenas of politics in the early 1860s. In addition to the National Hungarian Economic Association (OMGE), county economic and ethnic cultural associations operated. In Transylvania, the monarch convened the Diet in 1863, which accepted the equality of the Romanian nationality with the Hungarians, the Saxons and the Székelys. And the Greek Catholic and Romanian Orthodox became equal religions with the Roman Catholics, the Reformed, the Evangelical and the Unitarian. The Diet accepted the October Diploma and the February Patent, then elected representatives to the Reichsrat. The civil and criminal law reform developed by the Hungarian Chancellor Count Herman Zichy could not be introduced due to protests in Hungary in 1864. After an unsuccessful compromise with the conservatives, Franz Joseph I turned to the liberals. Negotiations with the Hungarian opposition began through the mediation of Baron Antal Augusz in 1865. Ferenc Deák published his ideas on the compromise on April 16. The monarch suspended military jurisdiction and dismissed the Transylvanian and Hungarian chancellors. On December 9, 1865, the Transylvanian Diet accepted the union with Hungary, and the monarch therefore dissolved the body. On December 14, 1865, the new parliament was opened by Franz Joseph I in person.

== Parties and leaders ==
In the election didn't participate parties, all of these groups formed after the election.

Parliamentary group	Leader
Deák Party (DP)	Ferenc Deák
Left Centre (BK)	Kálmán Ghyczy
Far Left (SZB)	József Madarász
Conservative '47ers (ÓK)	Imre Széchényi

== Electoral system ==
The elections were based on property, income and education census. Landowners with a ¼ plot of land (between 2.5 – 6.5 ha) or with 100 Ft income, merchants with their own businesses, craftsmen masters and factory owners. In the Royal free cities houses or landowners worth 300 Fts and the citizens. In Transylvania, scientists, surgeons, engineers, teachers, academic artists, members of the Hungarian Academy of Sciences, pharmacists and clergymen could also vote in all cities. In the Transylvanian counties, in Székely Land and Țara Făgărașului (Fogarasföld), those paying the 8 Ft tax and residents of villages consisting of at least 100 households were eligible to vote. 20 years older men were eligible to vote and 24 years older men could be elected. Women had no right for the participation. The elections were held exclusively in single-member district by open voting.

== Results ==
Party	Seats	+/–
Deák Party	268	New
Left Centre	92	New
Far Left	21	New
Independent Romanians	15	New
Conservative '47ers	7	New
Independent moderate	3	+2
Independent Serbs	2	New
Independent Slovaks	1	0
Total	409	–
Source: Ballabás-Pap-Pál

The group of independents are classified by their political position as 67'ers, moderate opposition or ethnic minority.

== Aftermath ==
The first task of every newly convened National Assembly is to verify the mandates of the representatives, which in this case was a long-lasting process, during which the mandates of 309 representatives were verified on the first day, then another 91 between January and May 1866, but the last 9 representatives only took place between November 1866 and September 1867.

The National Assembly's Committee 67 accepted Ferenc Deák's proposals for a compromise in 1866. The Austro-Prussian War intensified the opposition of the Left Centre and the Far Left, who wanted to fight for more rights, but Deák insisted on his previous position. The agreement reached at the negotiations in Vienna in January 1867 was accepted by Committee 67 on February 6, and the monarch appointed Count Gyula Andrássy as Prime Minister on February 17. The National Assembly accepted the Compromise and Franz Joseph I was crowned as the King of Hungary on June 12. The compromise became part of the new Cisleithanian constitution too.
