= Far-Left (Hungary) =

National Party of 1848 Országos 1848-as Párt
- Last leader: Dániel Irányi
- Founded: 1865 (as a faction); 2 April 1868 (as a party)
- Dissolved: 1 September 1884
- Preceded by: Resolution Party
- Succeeded by: Party of Independence and '48
- Headquarters: Budapest, Kingdom of Hungary
- Ideology: '49 ideology Radicalism
- Political position: Far-left
- Colours: Red

The Far-Left in the Budapest Parliament. In the image are visible notable figures of the Far-Left, such as József Madarász, Péter Csernovics, as well as politicians of the ethnic minorities, including Iosif Hodoșiu (Romanian), Adolf Dobriansky (Ruthenian) and Svetozar Miletić (Serb)

The National Party of 1848, or the Party of 1848 (Far-Left until 1870) was a Hungarian political party, whose members were mainly Lajos Kossuth's former supporters and those who opposed the Austro-Hungarian Compromise of 1867. Its members were mostly middle-class citizens and peasants. For a long time it was a faction of the Resolution Party and then of the Left Centre under the name of Szélsőbal.

The party participated the 1865 before becoming permanently independent in April 1868. The leaders were Ignác Helfy and Ernő Simonyi. Ignác Helfy were the leader at the time of the 1869 election, but he wasn't ever a party president. József Madarász were the leader of the party in the 1872 election. And Dániel Irányi would be the last leader of the party, who managed the merger with the Party of Independence.
