= 1869 Hungarian parliamentary election =

- 9 March–13 April 1869

All 409 seats in the Diet 205 seats needed for a majority
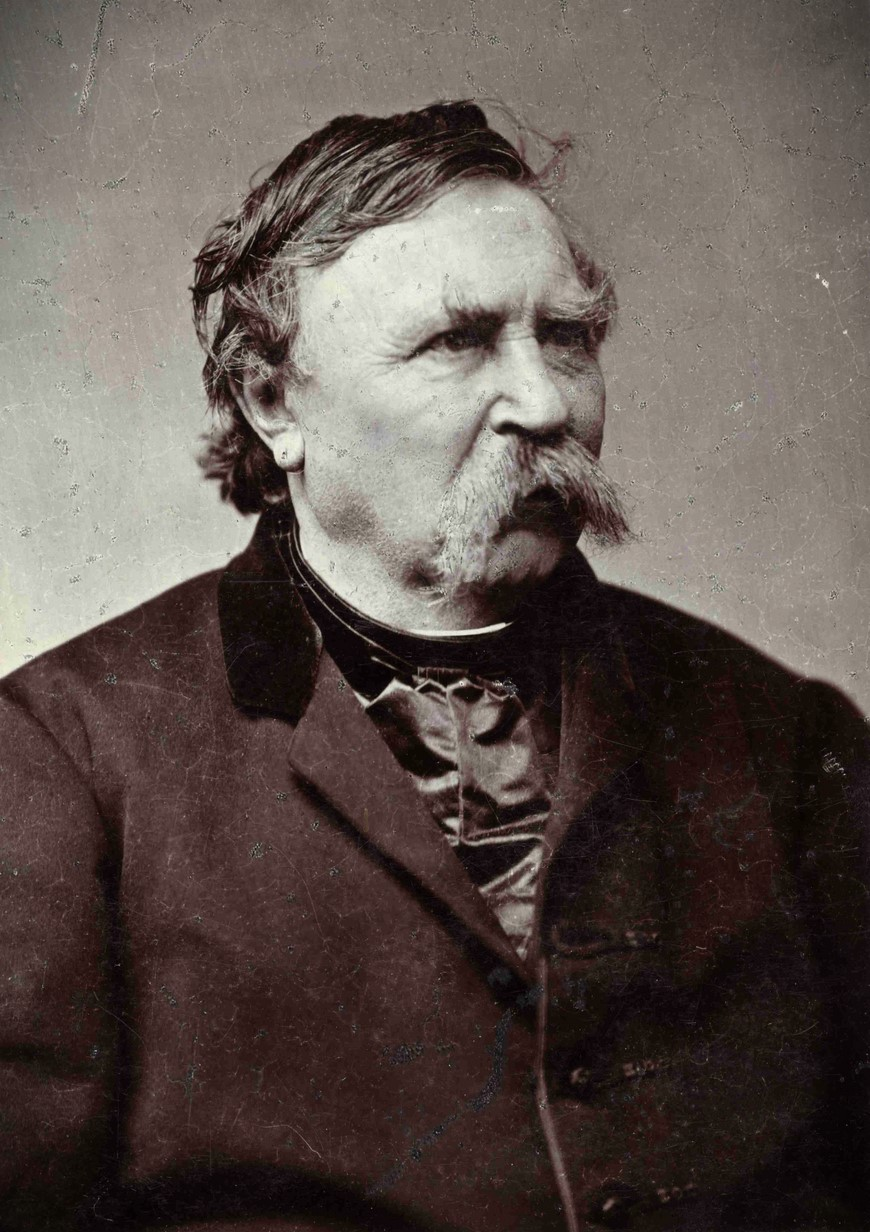

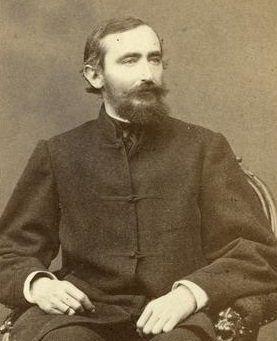

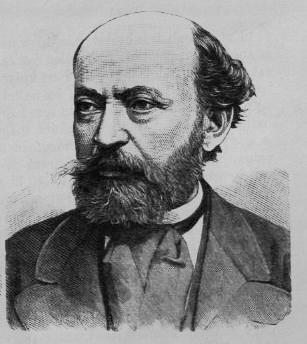

| | First party | Second party | Third party |
|---|---|---|---|
| Leader | Ferenc Deák | Kálmán Tisza | Ignác Helfy |
| Party | DP | BK | 1848P |
| Seats won | 246 / 409 | 112 / 409 | 36 / 409 |
| Seat change | ▼22 | ▲20 | ▲15 |
| Percentage | 60.15% | 27.38% | 8.80% |
| | Fourth party |
| Leader | Alexandru Mocioni |
| Party | PNRBU |
| Seats won | 8 / 413 |
| Seat change | New |
| Percentage | 2.44% |
Prime Minister before election
Gyula Andrássy
DP
Prime Minister after election
Gyula Andrássy
DP

Parliamentary elections were held in Hungary between 9 and 13 March 1869. This was the first parliamentary election since the adoption of the Austro-Hungarian Compromise of 1867. In connection with this, the Croatian–Hungarian Settlement was concluded, which the Parliament ratified with Act XXX of 1868. In the Parliament, Croats had the right to speak in Croatian, but their representatives were delegated by the Croatian Parliament and their election took place after the Croatian elections, independently of the Hungarian elections. The Grand Principality of Transylvania was abolished and incorporated into the Kingdom of Hungary. Act XLIV of 1868 granted equal rights to nationalities and allowed the use of minority languages in primary education, public administration and the judiciary. The Romanian and Serbian minority parties that were formed only demanded compliance with the law. The National Assembly accepted free conversion between recognized Christian denominations and interdenominational marriages, reformed the education system, and declared the independence of the courts in 1868. The Far Left rebranded as Party of 1848 prior the election. The Left Centre declared their critics about the government policy in their program Bihar Items. The new parliament convened on April 22, 1869.

== Parties and leaders ==
| Party | Leader |
|---|---|
| Deák Party (DP) | Ferenc Deák |
| Left Centre (BK) | Kálmán Tisza |
| Party of 1848 (1848P) | Ignác Helfy |
| National Party of Romanians in Hungary (PNRBU) | Alexandru Mocioni |
| Serbian People's Liberal Party (SNSS) | Svetozar Miletić |
| National Party of Romanians in Transylvania (PNRT) | Ilie Macelaru |

== Electoral system ==
The elections were based on property, income and education census. Landowners with a ¼ plot of land (between 2.5 – 6.5 ha) or with 100 Ft income, merchants with their own businesses, craftsmen masters and factory owners. In the Royal free cities houses or landowners worth 300 Fts and the citizens. In Transylvania, scientists, surgeons, engineers, teachers, academic artists, members of the Hungarian Academy of Sciences, pharmacists and clergymen could also vote in all cities. In the Transylvanian counties, in Székely Land and Țara Făgărașului (Fogarasföld), those paying the 8 Ft tax and residents of villages consisting of at least 100 households were eligible to vote. 20 years older men were eligible to vote and 24 years older men could be elected. Women had no right for the participation. The elections were held exclusively in single-member district by open voting.

== Results ==
| Party | Seats | +/– |
|---|---|---|
| Deák Party | 246 | -22 |
| Left Centre | 112 | +20 |
| Party of 1848 | 36 | +15 |
| National Party of Romanians in Hungary | 10 | New |
| Serbian People's Liberal Party | 2 | New |
| National Party of Romanians in Transylvania | 1 | New |
| Independent '49ers | 1 | +1 |
| Independent moderate | 1 | -2 |
| Total | 409 | – |
Source: Ballabás-Pap-Pál

The group of independents are classified by their political position as 49'ers and moderate opposition.

== Aftermath ==
The seat of the representative of the Arpașu de Jos (Alsóárpás) constituency in Țara Făgărașului (Fogarasföld) remained vacant throughout the entire parliamentary term. After the mandate of Ion Antonelli, who had won as a member of the National Party of Romanians in Transylvania, was annulled. Prime Minister Count Gyula Andrássy successfully influenced the monarch to ensure that Austria-Hungary remained neutral in the Franco-Prussian War in 1870. In order to maintain Hungarian influence in the Habsburg monarchy, it was necessary for Cisleithania to be excluded from German unity. And for the same reason he protested successfully against the Bohemian Fundamental Articles of 1871. The monarch Franz Joseph I then appointed him Minister of Foreign Affairs of Austria-Hungary.
