= Čertižné =

- Municipality
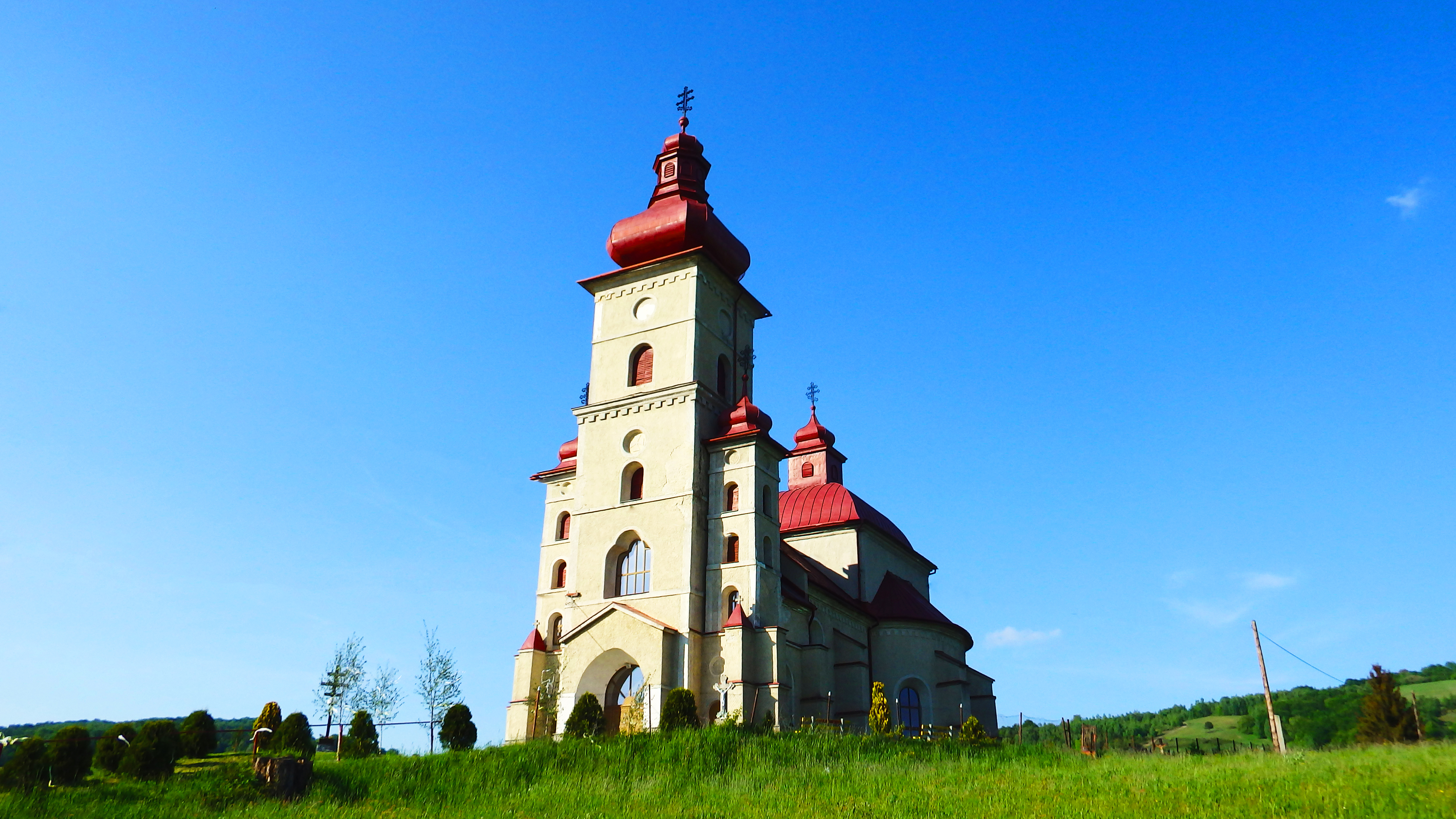
- Church of the Ascension

- Flag

- Location of Čertižné in the Prešov Region Location of Čertižné in Slovakia
- Coordinates: 49.35°N 21.83°E
- Country: Slovakia
- Region: Prešov Region
- District: Medzilaborce District
- First mentioned: 1431

Area
  - Total: 23.72 km^{2} (9.16 sq mi)
- Elevation: 438 m (1,437 ft)

Population (2025)
  - Total: 301
- Time zone: UTC+1 (CET)
  - Summer (DST): UTC+2 (CEST)
- Postal code: 675 2
- Area code: +421 57
- Vehicle registration plate (until 2022): ML
- Website: www.certizne.eu

Čertižné (Rusyn: Чертижне; Hungarian: Nagycsertész) is a village and municipality in the Medzilaborce District in the Prešov Region of far north-eastern Slovakia.

== History ==
In historical records the village was first mentioned in 1431. Before the establishment of independent Czechoslovakia in 1918, it was part of Zemplén County within the Kingdom of Hungary.

== Geography ==
The municipality lies at an altitude of 438 metres (1,437 ft) and covers an area of 23.72 km^{2} (9.16 sq mi) (2025).

== Population ==
Population statistic (10 years)
| Year | 1995 | 2005 | 2015 | 2025 |
|---|---|---|---|---|
| Count | 471 | 402 | 342 | 301 |
| Difference | | −14.64% | −14.92% | −11.98% |

Population statistic
| Year | 2024 | 2025 |
|---|---|---|
| Count | 304 | 301 |
| Difference | | −0.98% |

It has a population of 301 people (31 December 2025).

=== Ethnicity ===
Census 2021 (1+ %)
| Ethnicity | Number | Fraction |
|---|---|---|
| Rusyn | 248 | 76.78% |
| Slovak | 164 | 50.77% |
| Not found out | 10 | 3.09% |
| Ukrainian | 5 | 1.54% |
| Total | 323 | |

In year 2021 was 323 people by ethnicity 248 as Rusyn, 164 as Slovak, 10 as Not found out, 5 as Ukrainian, 2 as Czech and 2 as Hungarian.

Note on population: The difference values of population numbers in the table "Population statistic" and in the sections "Ethnicity" & "Religion" is caused by the use of various statistical methods.

=== Religion ===
Census 2021 (1+ %)
| Religion | Number | Fraction |
|---|---|---|
| Greek Catholic Church | 233 | 72.14% |
| Eastern Orthodox Church | 34 | 10.53% |
| Roman Catholic Church | 23 | 7.12% |
| None | 23 | 7.12% |
| Not found out | 8 | 2.48% |
| Total | 323 | |

In year 2021 was 323 people by religion 233 from Greek Catholic Church, 34 from Eastern Orthodox Church, 23 from Roman Catholic Church, 23 from None, 8 from Not found out, 1 from Jehovah's Witnesses and 1 from Evangelical Church.

== Genealogical resources ==
The records for genealogical research are available at the state archive "Statny Archiv in Presov, Slovakia"

- Roman Catholic church records (births/marriages/deaths): 1786-1898 (parish B)
- Greek Catholic church records (births/marriages/deaths): 1819-1926 (parish A)

== Gallery ==
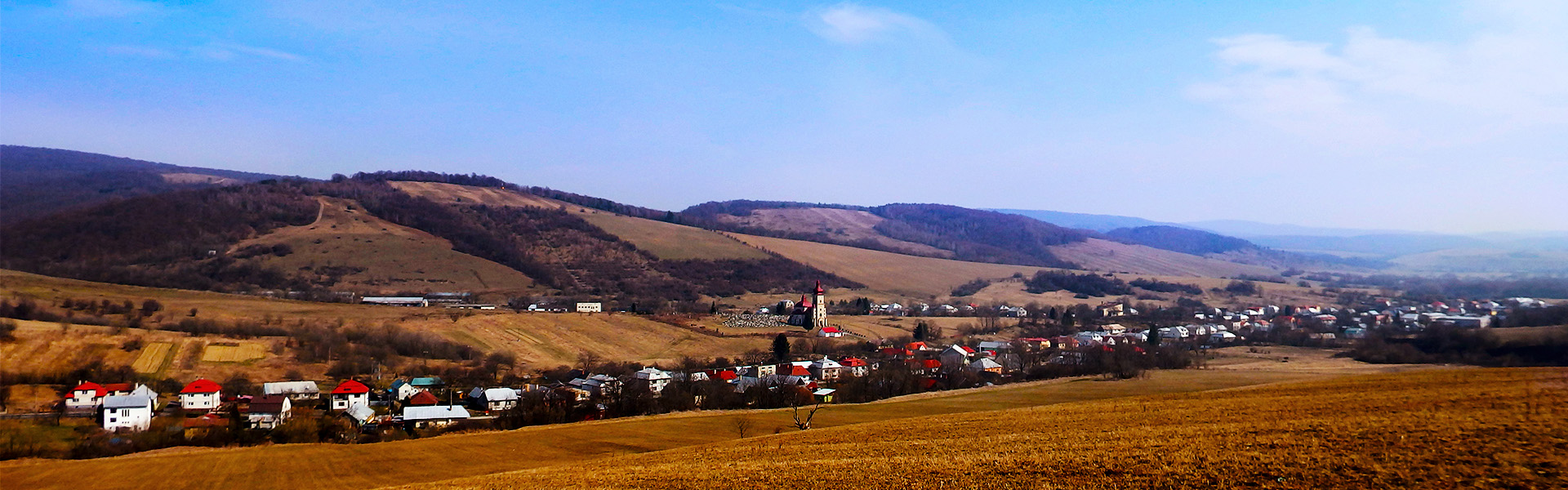
Čertižné village panorama (March 2015)

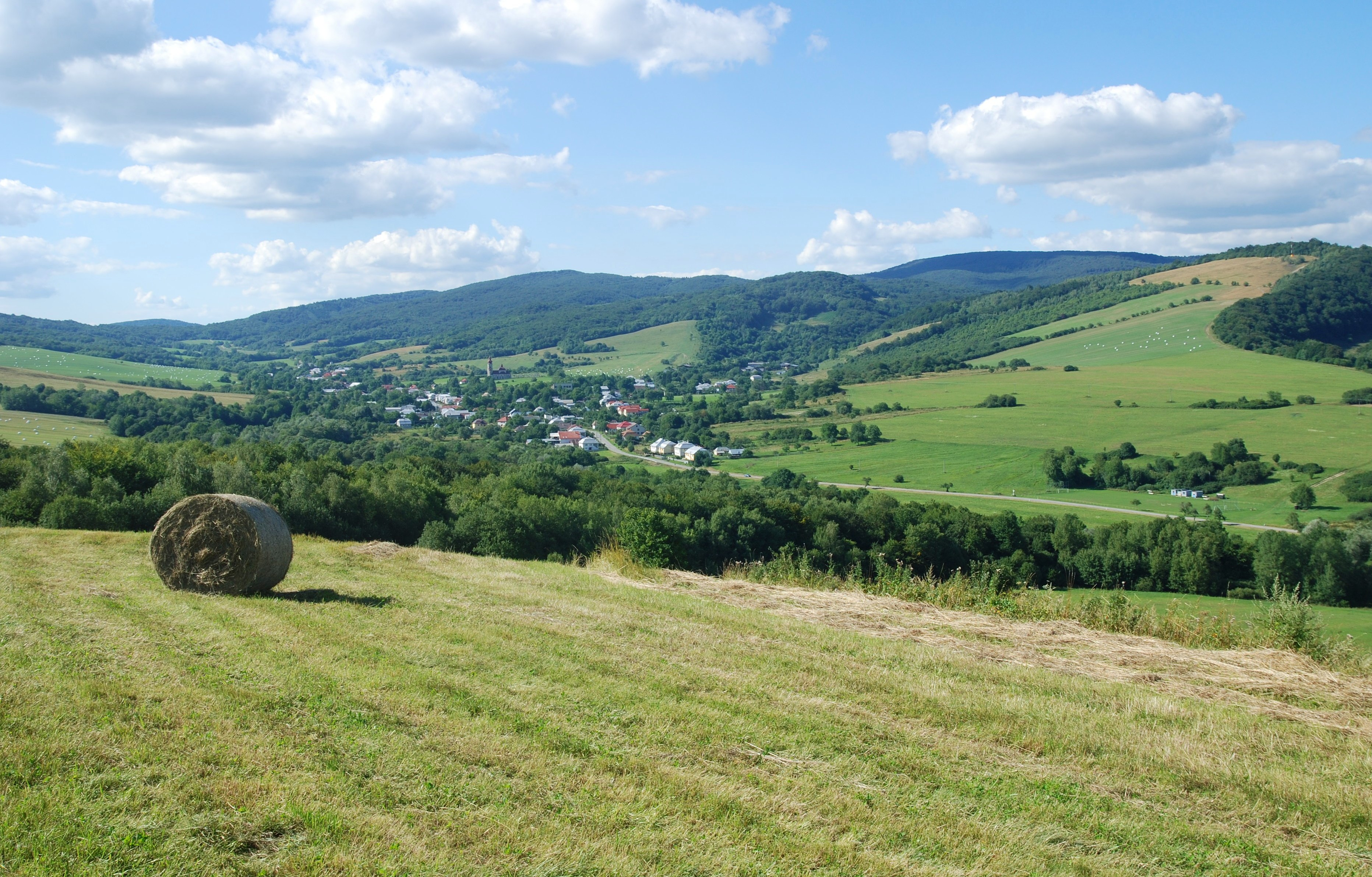
A view of Čertižné and the local landscape (August 2016)

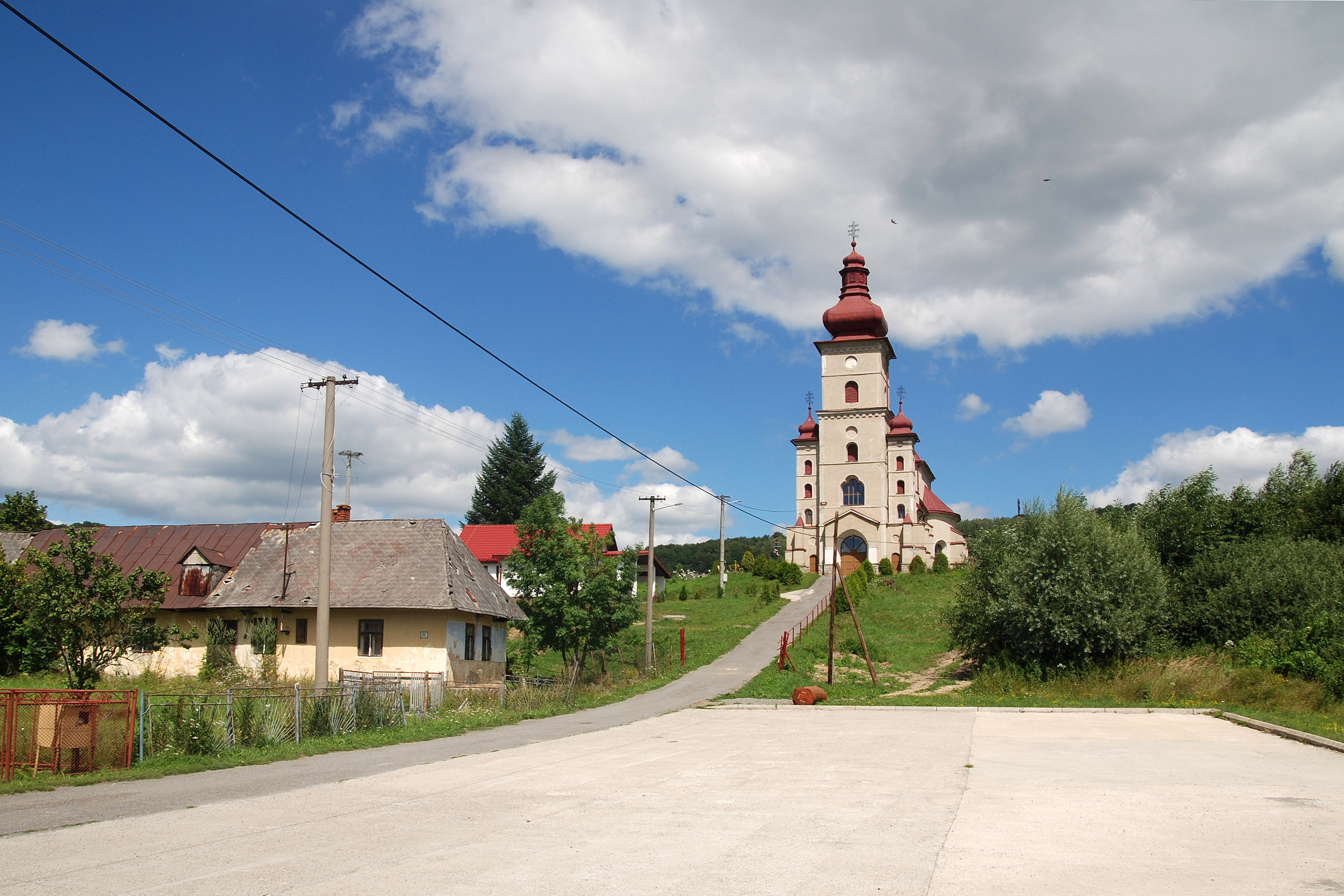
Greek Catholic Church of the Ascension of the Lord in Čertižné

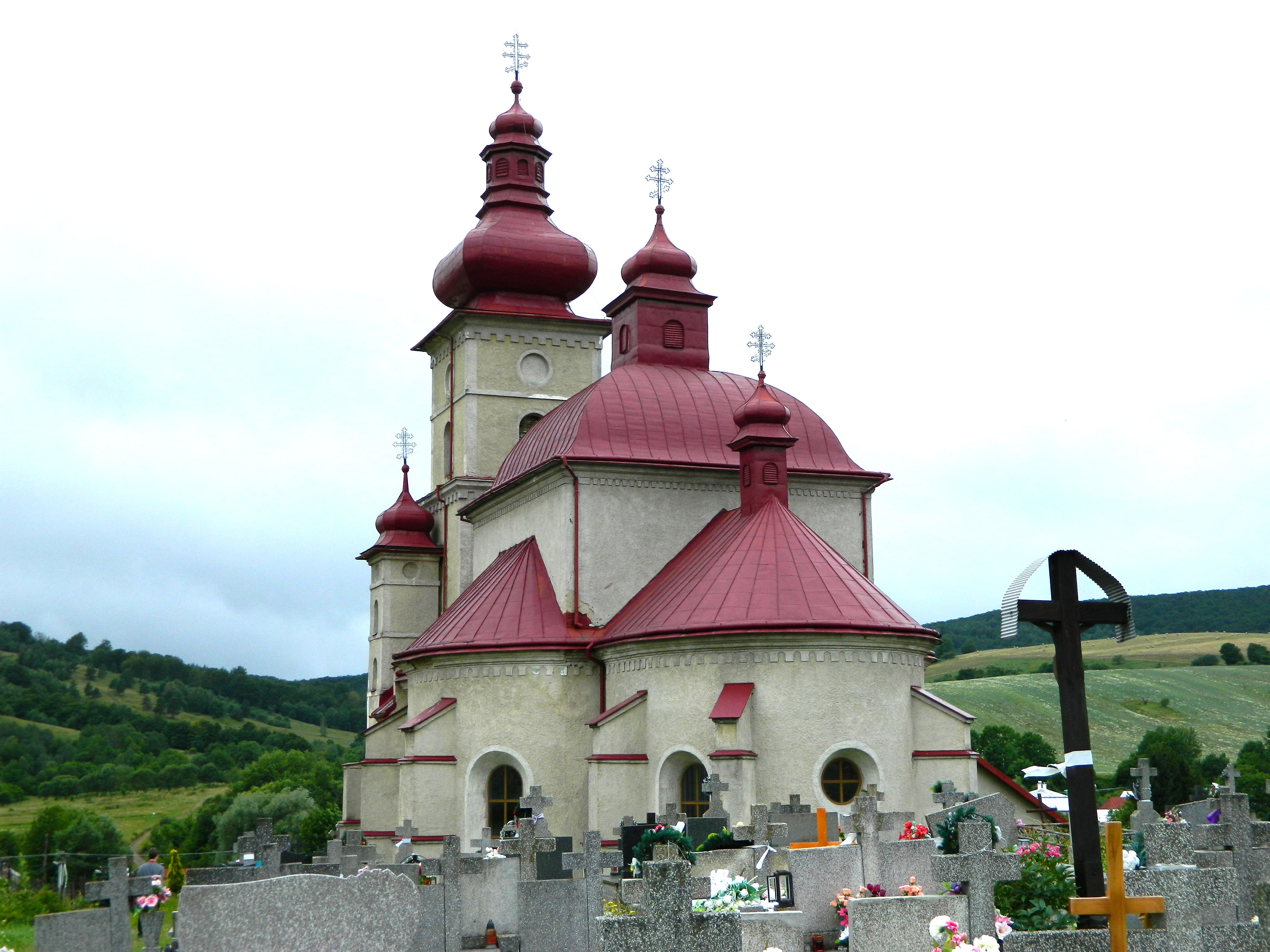
Greek Catholic Church of the Ascension of the Lord and cemetery in Čertižné

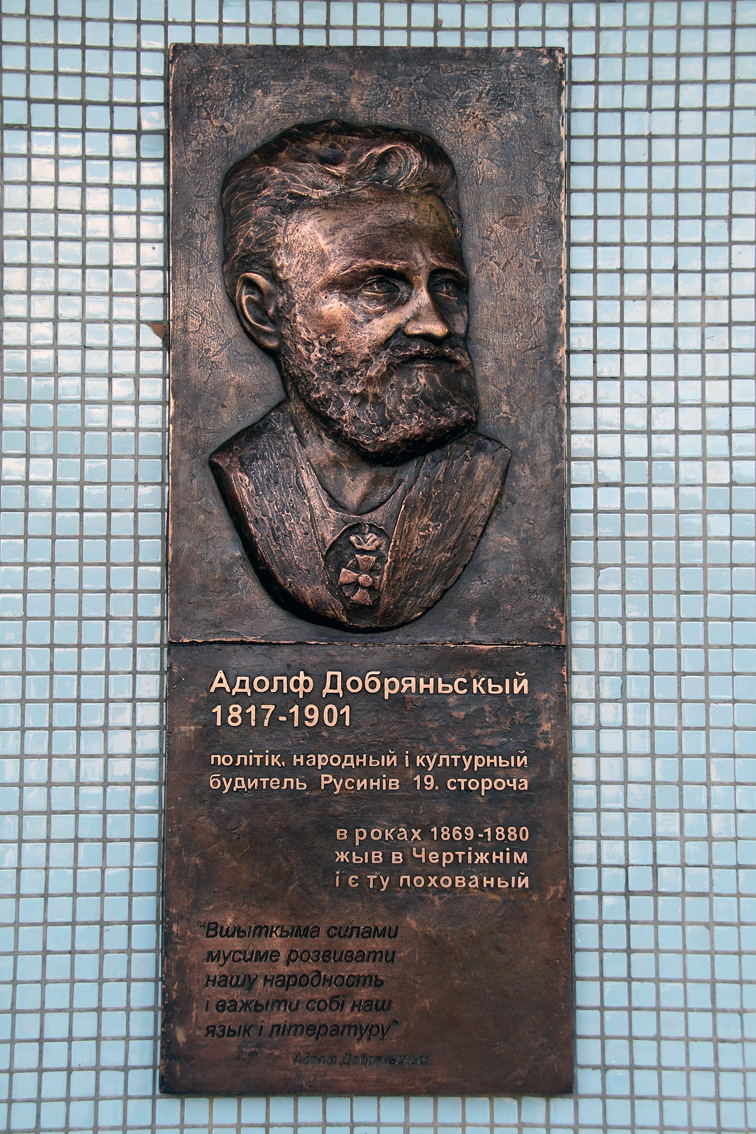
Memorial plaque of A. Dobriansky (1817–1901) in Čertižné (in Rusyn)

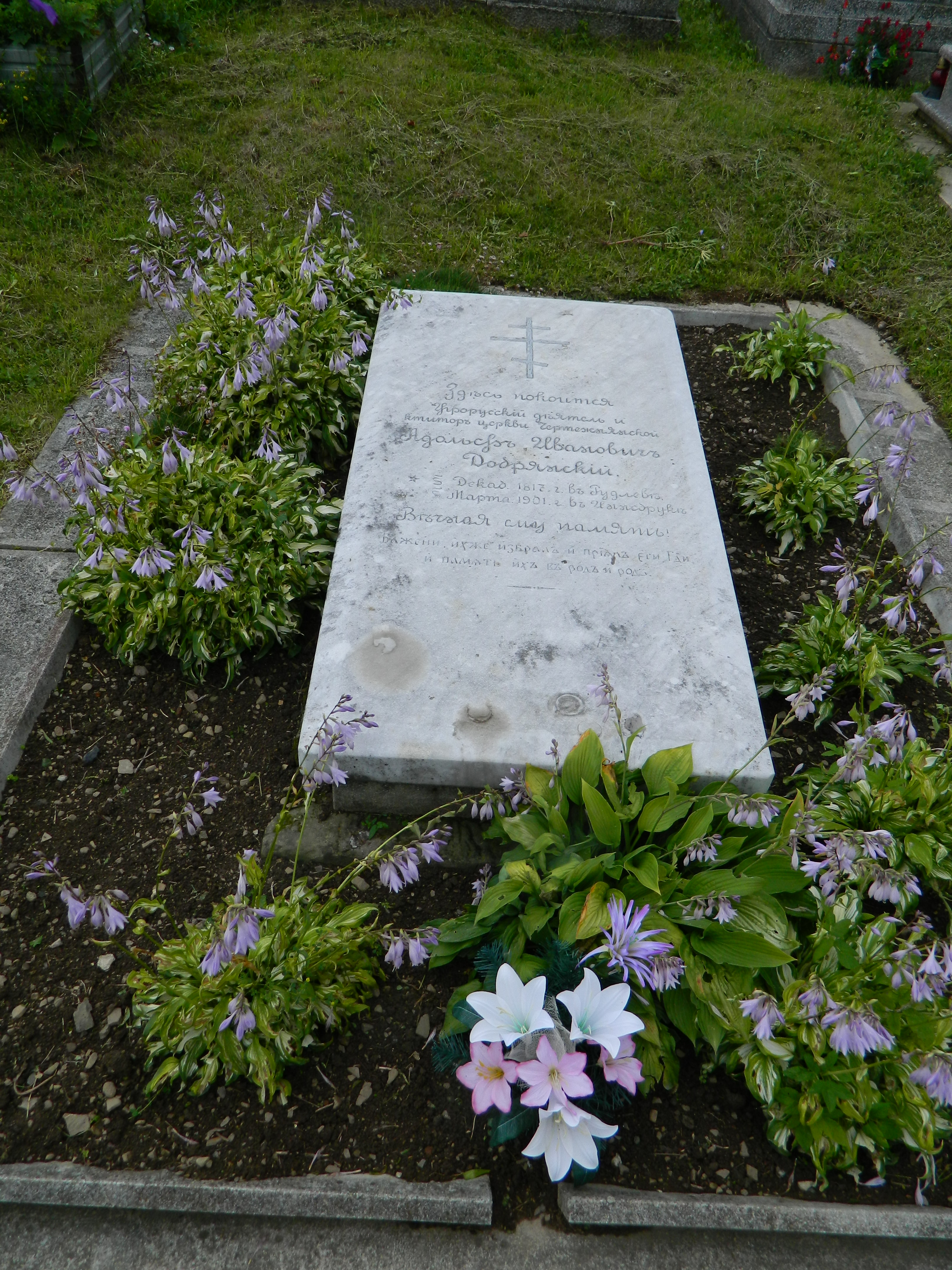
The grave of A. Dobriansky at the cemetery in Čertižné

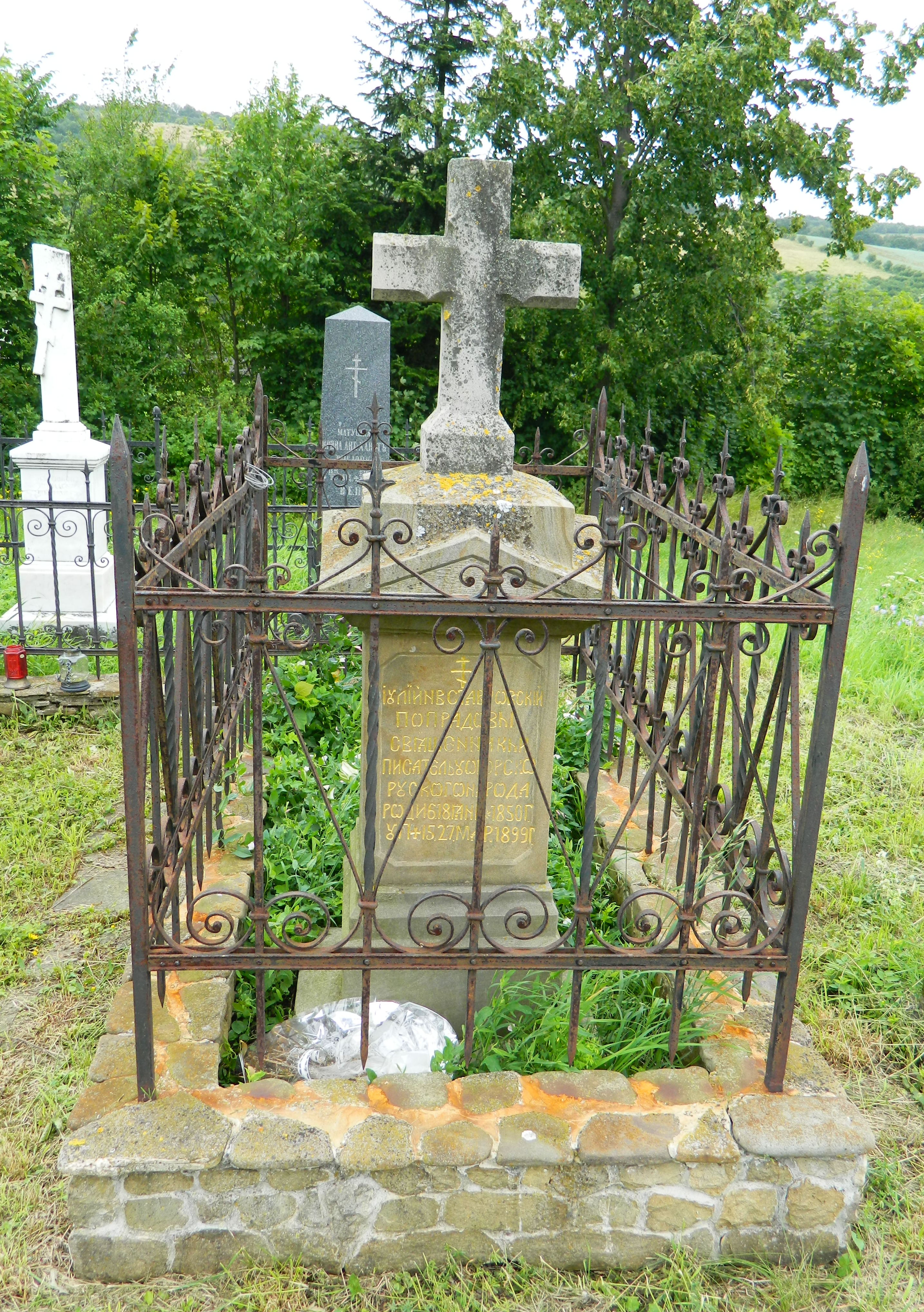
The grave of J. I. Stavrovskij at the cemetery in Čertižné

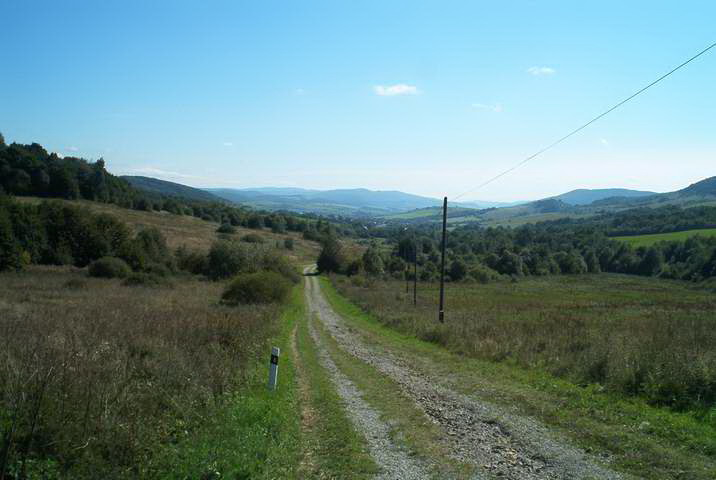
The Czeremcha-Čertižné foot-only border crossing between Poland and Slovakia (mountain pass footpath)

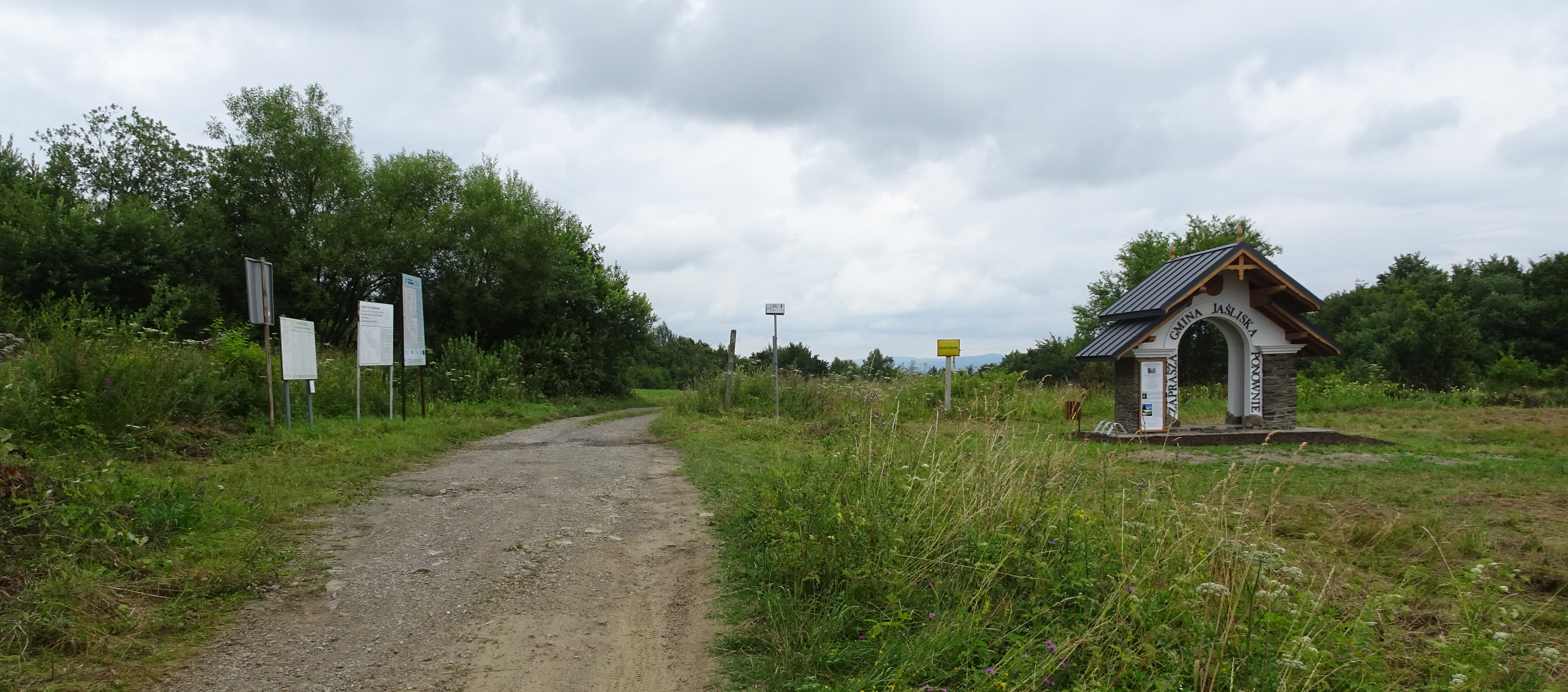
The Jaśliska-Čertižné foot-only border crossing between Poland and Slovakia

== See also ==
- List of municipalities and towns in Slovakia
