= Petar Čarnojević =

Hungarian politician (1810–1892)

Petar Čarnojević Count of Temes
- Петар Чарнојевић
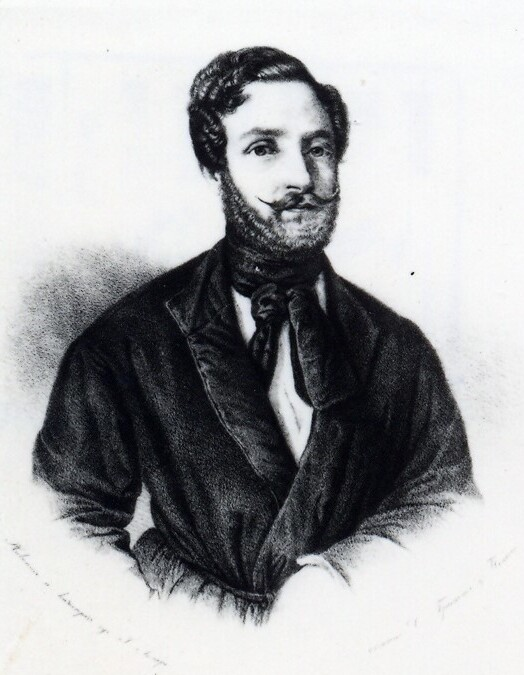

Royal Commissioner and Grand Prefect of Temes County
- In office 23 April 1848 – 24 July 1848
- Preceded by: Ferenc Tihanyi
- Succeeded by: Móric Szentkirályi

Personal details
- Born: 13 March 1810 Mácsa, Kingdom of Hungary
- Died: 27 April 1892 (aged 82) Fény, Austria-Hungary
- Citizenship: Hungarian
- Party: National Party of 1848

Count Petar Čarnojević (Serbian: Петар Чарнојевић, Hungarian: Csernovits Péter; Mača, Kingdom of Hungary, 13 March 1810 - Fenj, Austria-Hungary, 27 April 1892) was a Hungarian nobleman and politician who served as Prefect of Temes County and Royal Commissioner during the Hungarian Revolution of 1848.

== Life and career ==
Čarnojević was born on 13 March 1810 in Mácsa, in Arad County, Hungary, as the son of Pavle Čarnojević (1755–1840) and his wife, Laura Vojnić (d. 1842). He hailed from a family of Serbian descent whose oldest patriarch had gained Hungarian nobility in 1720. In 1843 he was elected to the Hungarian Parliament for Arad County.

=== Revolution of 1848-49 ===
At the end of April 1848, during the Hungarian Revolution, the government of Lajos Batthyány appointed him Royal Commissioner and Grand Prefect of Tamis County with the task of squelching the insurgents in southern Hungary. He was also awarded the title of Count of Tamis. He served as commissioner from April 26 until the end of July 1848.

Initially, it was supposed to examine the demands of the insurgents, and, if possible, reach an agreement with the Kingdom of Hungary. However, after the riots in Velika Kikinda and the destruction of the Greater Kikinda District, his powers were expanded and his mission changed. His goal was to establish order and peace, property and personal security in Toronto County and to punish the perpetrators of the riots in Velika Kikinda. In the territories of the counties Bačko-Bodroške, Torontalske, Tamiške, Krašovske and Aradska, and in the royal cities Subotica, Sombor, Novi Sad, Arad and Timișoara, as well as in Šajkaškoj oblasti, courts were formed. Many Serbs were sentenced to death and some were hanged.

Both sides condemned him - the Serbs considered him a betrayer of national interests, while the Hungarians resented his indecision and reluctance to use force to quell the Rebellion. In July 1848 Čarnojević was relieved of his duties by the Hungarian government who felt he had not done enough to punish the Serb insurgents. He was replaced by the Deputy Mayor of Tamis Sava Vukovic.

In 1849 he secretly buried his cousin, the infamous Hungarian General János Damjanich as well György Lahner. In 1861, he was a member of the Annunciation Council, when he advocated rapprochement with the Hungarians. He participated little in the political life of the Serbs however. He was a patron of the Arad Theater. From 1865 to 1875 he was a member of the Hungarian Parliament in three cycles. He was affiliated with the Hungarian nationalist movement, which led to the Serb nationalist press in Hungary to label him as "not Serb with the heart, nor with the mind".

== Personal life ==
He was married to Ruža, the daughter of the captain Miša Anastasijević. They had a son Arsenije and a daughter Laura.

== Death ==
Čarnojević died on 27 April 1892 in Fenj. His remains were transferred to the family tomb in Rusko Selo near Kikinda. The obituary states: "The late Čarnojević did not always hit a good path in politics; but he was an honest Serb, who always sincerely wished his people well, and who stood up for them to the best of his ability. He was a good and noble-hearted man."
