= Rudlov =

- Municipality
- Flag

- Location of Rudlov in the Prešov Region Location of Rudlov in Slovakia
- Coordinates: 48.92°N 21.57°E
- Country: Slovakia
- Region: Prešov Region
- District: Vranov nad Topľou District
- First mentioned: 1402

Area
  - Total: 16.04 km^{2} (6.19 sq mi)
- Elevation: 192 m (630 ft)

Population (2025)
  - Total: 737
- Time zone: UTC+1 (CET)
  - Summer (DST): UTC+2 (CEST)
- Postal code: 943 5
- Area code: +421 57
- Vehicle registration plate (until 2022): VT
- Website: obecrudlov.sk

Rudlov (Hungarian: Ércfalva, until 1899: Rudlyó) is a village and obec (municipality) in Vranov nad Topľou District in the Prešov Region of eastern Slovakia.

== History ==
In historical records the village was first mentioned in 1402.

== Geography ==
The municipality lies at an altitude of 192 metres (630 ft) and covers an area of 16.04 km^{2} (6.19 sq mi) (2025).

== Population ==
Population statistic (10 years)
Year	1995	2005	2015	2025
Count	604	641	679	737
Difference		+6.12%	+5.92%	+8.54%

Population statistic
Year	2024	2025
Count	731	737
Difference		+0.82%

It has a population of 737 people (31 December 2025).

=== Ethnicity ===
Census 2021 (1+ %)
Ethnicity	Number	Fraction
Slovak	671	97.67%
Romani	185	26.92%
Not found out	14	2.03%
Total	687	

In year 2021 was 687 people by ethnicity 671 as Slovak, 185 as Romani, 14 as Not found out, 5 as Other, 4 as Czech and 3 as Rusyn.

Note on population: The difference values of population numbers in the table "Population statistic" and in the sections "Ethnicity" & "Religion" is caused by the use of various statistical methods.

=== Religion ===
Census 2021 (1+ %)
Religion	Number	Fraction
Greek Catholic Church	511	74.38%
Roman Catholic Church	129	18.78%
None	27	3.93%
Not found out	10	1.46%
Total	687	

In year 2021 was 687 people by religion 511 from Greek Catholic Church, 129 from Roman Catholic Church, 27 from None, 10 from Not found out, 5 from Evangelical Church, 2 from Church of the Brethren, 2 from Ad hoc movements and 1 from Eastern Orthodox Church.
