= Deák Party =

Former Hungarian political party (1865–1875)

Deák Party Deák Párt
- Founded: 16 April 1865
- Dissolved: 1 March 1875
- Preceded by: Address Party
- Succeeded by: Liberal Party
- Headquarters: Budapest, Hungary
- Colours: Blue

The Deák Party (Hungarian: Deák Párt) was a political party in Hungary in the 1860s and 1870s led by Ferenc Deák.

== History ==
The Deák Party was founded in 1865 as the successor to the Address Party. It won the 1865 elections in Hungary, and also won a large majority in the 1869 elections following the Austro-Hungarian Compromise of 1867. It won another majority in the 1872 elections, but Deák retired from public life in 1873, setting the party into decline.

In February 1875 it merged with the Left Centre to form the Liberal Party.
