= Sačurov =

- Municipality
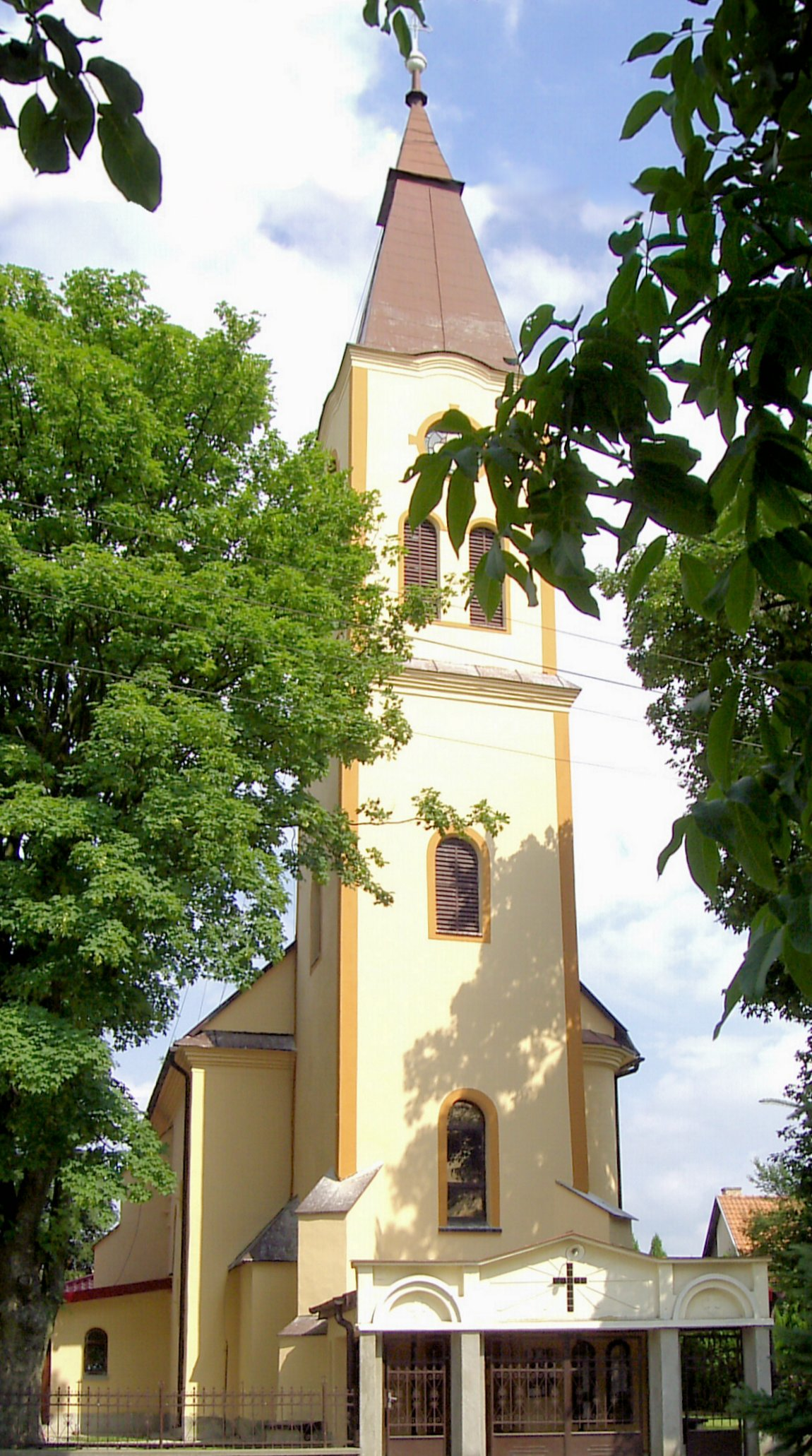

- Flag Coat of arms

- Location of Sačurov in the Prešov Region Location of Sačurov in Slovakia
- Coordinates: 48.82°N 21.70°E
- Country: Slovakia
- Region: Prešov Region
- District: Vranov nad Topľou District
- First mentioned: 1402

Area
  - Total: 21.17 km^{2} (8.17 sq mi)
- Elevation: 124 m (407 ft)

Population (2025)
  - Total: 2,659
- Time zone: UTC+1 (CET)
  - Summer (DST): UTC+2 (CEST)
- Postal code: 941 3
- Area code: +421 57
- Vehicle registration plate (until 2022): VT
- Website: sacurov.sk

Sačurov (Hungarian: Szacsúr) is a village and municipality in Vranov nad Topľou District in the Prešov Region of eastern Slovakia.

== History ==
In historical records the village was first mentioned in 1402.

== Geography ==
The municipality lies at an altitude of 124 metres (407 ft) and covers an area of 21.17 km^{2} (8.17 sq mi) (2025).

== Population ==
Population statistic (10 years)
Year	1995	2005	2015	2025
Count	1871	2043	2362	2659
Difference		+9.19%	+15.61%	+12.57%

Population statistic
Year	2024	2025
Count	2610	2659
Difference		+1.87%

It has a population of 2659 people (31 December 2025).

=== Ethnicity ===
Census 2021 (1+ %)
Ethnicity	Number	Fraction
Slovak	2045	82.52%
Romani	831	33.53%
Not found out	174	7.02%
Total	2478	

In year 2021 was 2478 people by ethnicity 2045 as Slovak, 831 as Romani, 174 as Not found out, 8 as Czech, 5 as Russian, 3 as Ukrainian, 3 as Polish, 2 as Rusyn, 2 as German, 1 as Vietnamese and 1 as Other.

Note on population: The difference values of population numbers in the table "Population statistic" and in the sections "Ethnicity" & "Religion" is caused by the use of various statistical methods.

=== Religion ===
Census 2021 (1+ %)
Religion	Number	Fraction
Roman Catholic Church	943	38.05%
None	727	29.34%
Greek Catholic Church	622	25.1%
Not found out	154	6.21%
Total	2478	

In year 2021 was 2478 people by religion 943 from Roman Catholic Church, 727 from None, 622 from Greek Catholic Church, 154 from Not found out, 10 from Evangelical Church, 6 from Jehovah's Witnesses, 5 from Other, 3 from Ad hoc movements, 2 from Eastern Orthodox Church, 1 from Calvinist Church, 1 from Paganism and natural spirituality, 1 from Hinduism, 1 from United Methodist Church, 1 from Buddhism and 1 from Apostolic Church.
