= Left Centre =

Left Centre Balközép
- Historical leaders: Kálmán Tisza; Kálmán Ghyczy
- Founded: 1865
- Dissolved: 1 March 1875; 150 years ago
- Preceded by: Resolution Party
- Succeeded by: Liberal; F48P
- Headquarters: Budapest, Hungary
- Colours: Blue

The Left Centre (Hungarian: Balközép) was a political party in Hungary in the 1860s and 1870s led by Kálmán Tisza and Kálmán Ghyczy.

== History ==
The Left Centre finished second to the Deák Party in elections in 1865, 1869 and 1872. It was opposed to the Austro-Hungarian Compromise of 1867, and continued to demand an independent Hungarian army.

Despite its rivalry with the Deák Party, the two merged in February 1875 to form the Liberal Party. A group of former Left Centre members broke away to reform the party in 1877, but it was not successful.
