= József Madarász =

Hungarian politician (1814–1915)

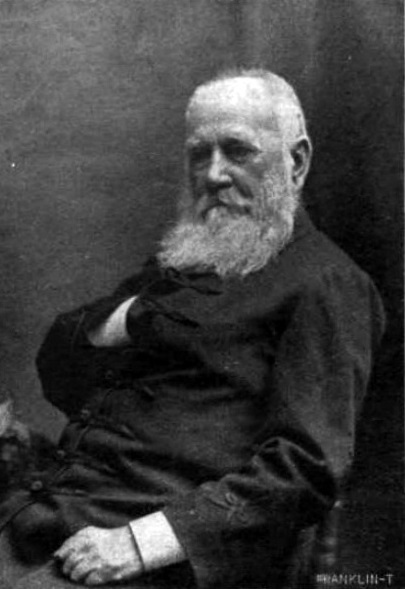
- Madarász in 1915

Speaker of the House of Representatives
- In office 17 December 1898 – 2 March 1899
- Preceded by: Dezső Szilágyi
- Succeeded by: Dezső Perczel

Personal details
- Born: 27 August 1814 Nemeskisfalud, Kingdom of Hungary, Austrian Empire
- Died: 31 January 1915 (aged 100) Kispest, Austria-Hungary
- Party: Resolution Party (1861); Left Centre (1865–1868); Party of 1848 (1868–1870); Party of Independence and '48 (1884–1915)
- Parents: Gedeon Madarász; Zsófia Tóth
- Profession: Lawyer; politician

József Madarász de Kisfalud (Hungarian: kisfaludi Madarász József; 27 August 1814 – 31 January 1915) was a Hungarian lawyer and politician who served as Speaker of the House of Representatives between 1898 and 1899. He functioned as an emissary in the Hungarian Diet of 1832–1836. Later he served as Member of Parliament from 1848 until his death in 1915, except for the period between 1848 and 1867 when the National Assembly was not convened.

== Biography ==
He was born into a Calvinist family, his parents were court judge Gedeon Madarász and Zsófia Tóth.

== See also ==
- Laszló Lovassy
- Ferenc Pulszky

Political offices
Preceded by Dezső Szilágyi	Speaker of the House of Representatives; 1898–1899	Succeeded by Dezső Perczel
