= Hungarian parliamentary elections =

Hungarian parliamentary elections determine the composition of the Hungarian parliament.

== Procedure since 2014 ==
Elections to the National Assembly, the unicameral legislative body of Hungary, take place every four years. The members are elected by universal and direct suffrage. 106 members are elected in single-member constituencies. The rest 93 members are elected from party lists and the 13 ethnic-minority lists.

=== Voter and candidate eligibility ===
Any Hungarian citizen over the age of 18 who hasn't been disenfranchised by a court is eligible to elect the members of the National Assembly and to stand for election.

A candidate may run either as a member of a political party or an electoral bloc or as an independent candidate. The law requires candidates to run in only one electoral district. Candidates are required to collect 500 voter signatures in their district.

=== Voting location and times ===
Voting takes place from 6:00 AM to 7:00 PM.

== List of Hungarian parliamentary elections ==
=== In the Reform Age ===
- 1825 Hungarian parliamentary election
- 1830 Hungarian parliamentary election
- 1832 Hungarian parliamentary election
- 1839 Hungarian parliamentary election
- 1843 Hungarian parliamentary election
- 1847 Hungarian parliamentary election

=== Between the Revolution and the Compromise ===
- 1848 Hungarian parliamentary election
- 1861 Hungarian parliamentary election
- 1865 Hungarian parliamentary election

=== In Austria-Hungary ===
- 1869 Hungarian parliamentary election
- 1872 Hungarian parliamentary election
- 1875 Hungarian parliamentary election
- 1878 Hungarian parliamentary election
- 1881 Hungarian parliamentary election
- 1884 Hungarian parliamentary election
- 1887 Hungarian parliamentary election
- 1892 Hungarian parliamentary election
- 1896 Hungarian parliamentary election
- 1901 Hungarian parliamentary election
- 1905 Hungarian parliamentary election
- 1906 Hungarian parliamentary election
- 1910 Hungarian parliamentary election

=== Under the Horthy regency ===
- 1920 Hungarian parliamentary election
- 1922 Hungarian parliamentary election
- 1926 Hungarian parliamentary election
- 1931 Hungarian parliamentary election
- 1935 Hungarian parliamentary election
- 1939 Hungarian parliamentary election

=== Between 1944 and 1946 ===
- 1944 Hungarian parliamentary election
- 1945 Hungarian parliamentary election

=== In the Second Hungarian Republic ===
- 1947 Hungarian parliamentary election
- 1949 Hungarian parliamentary election

=== In the Hungarian People's Republic ===
- 1953 Hungarian parliamentary election
- 1958 Hungarian parliamentary election
- 1963 Hungarian parliamentary election
- 1967 Hungarian parliamentary election
- 1971 Hungarian parliamentary election
- 1975 Hungarian parliamentary election
- 1980 Hungarian parliamentary election
- 1985 Hungarian parliamentary election

=== Since 1990 ===
- 1990 Hungarian parliamentary election
- 1994 Hungarian parliamentary election
- 1998 Hungarian parliamentary election
- 2002 Hungarian parliamentary election
- 2006 Hungarian parliamentary election
- 2010 Hungarian parliamentary election
- 2014 Hungarian parliamentary election
- 2018 Hungarian parliamentary election
- 2022 Hungarian parliamentary election
- 2026 Hungarian parliamentary election

== See also ==
- Elections in Hungary
