= 1839 Hungarian parliamentary election =

- May 1839

All 209 seats in the Diet 59–153 seats needed for a majority
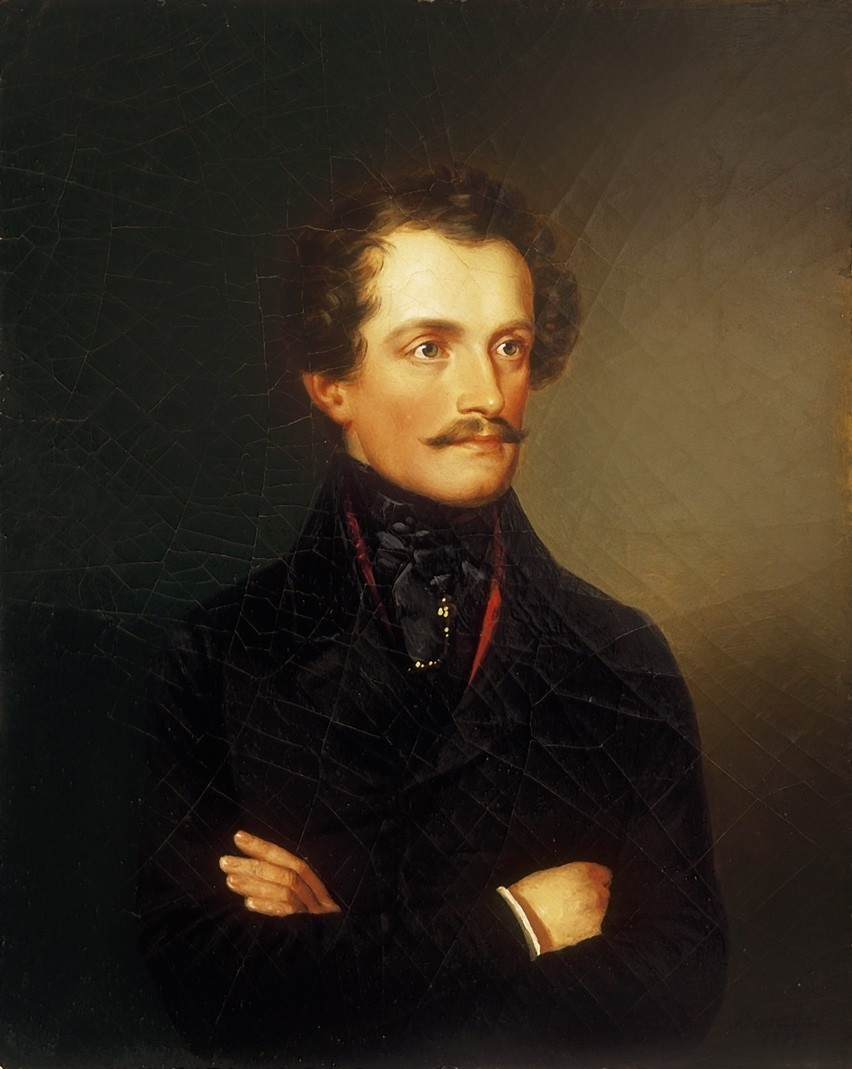

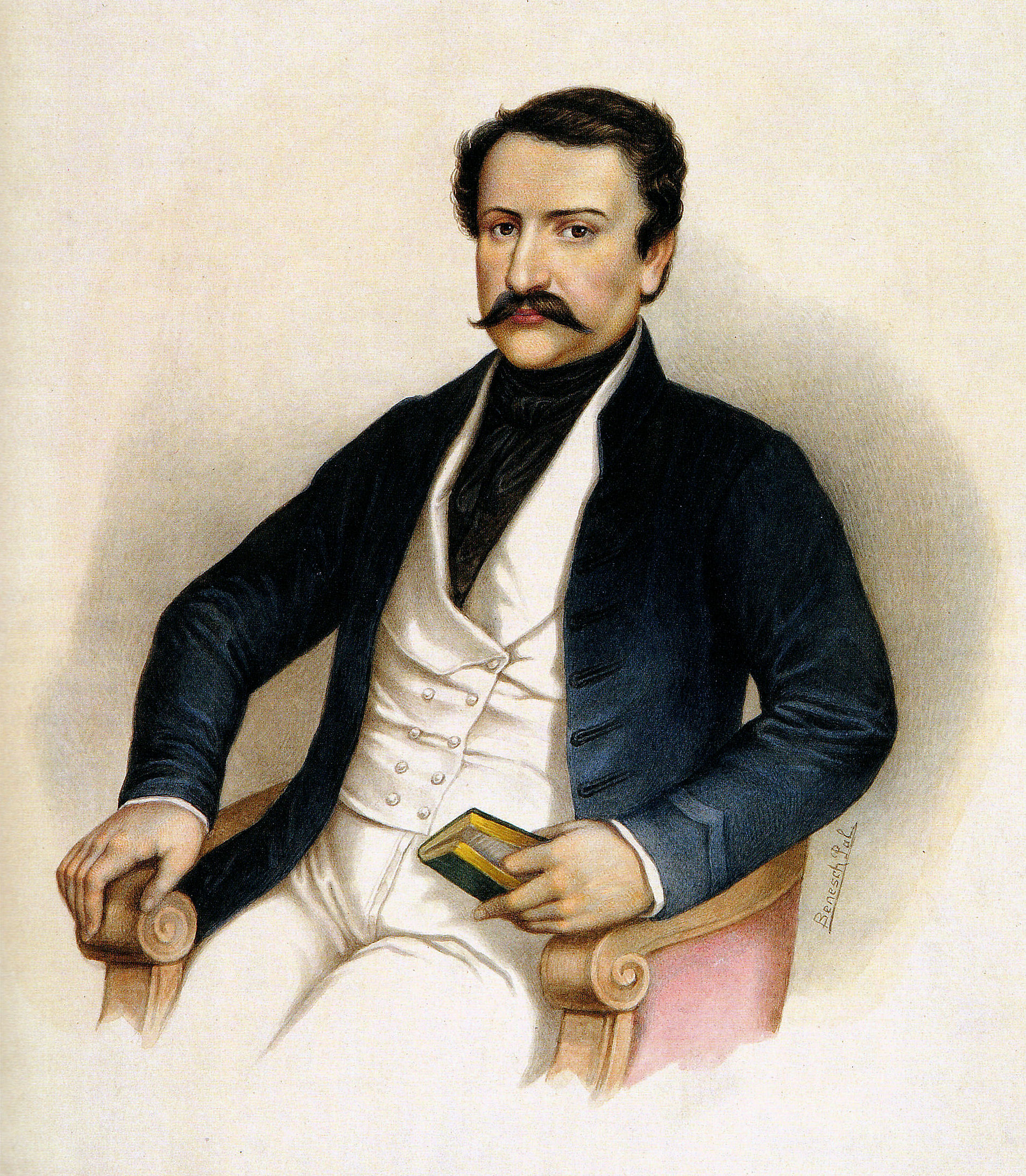
	First party	Second party
Leader	Aurél Dessewffy	Ferenc Deák
Party	Conservatives	Reformers
Seats won	72 / 209	112 / 209
Seat change	▲4	▼4
Percentage	34.45%	53.59%
Cont. votes	23 / 58	22 / 58
Votes change	▲4	▲1
Contingent %	39,66%	37,93%

Parliamentary elections were held in the Kingdom of Hungary, Croatia and Slavonia in May 1839. The Diet of Hungary was elected according to the rules three years after the dissolution of the previous Diet. The State Conference used the period between the two Diet to take action against the reformers. They assumed that the reformers who had come under foreign influence were part of a separatist conspiracy, so they initiated treason trials against their leaders. Among the accused, Baron Miklós Wesselényi was able to defend himself at large, and thus he was able to help in the rescue work of the 1838 Pest Flood. László Lovassy was accused of organizing the Youth Social Association. Lajos Kossuth, a journalist, reported on the public life of the counties and cities under the title Törvényházi Tudósítások (Reports of the legal authorities), and after the banning of his newspaper in 1837, he continued his work in secret, and was therefore arrested. Wesselényi, Lovassy and Kossuth were sentenced to prison. As another attempt to re-annex the Partium from Transylvania to Hungary, the affected counties were invited to the Diet, but only Kraszna and Zaránd were represented, while Central Szolnok and the Țara Chioarului were not. The leader of the conservatives was Count Aurél Dessewffy in the Diet, who directed the relief efforts for the victims of the Pest flood. The leader of the reformers was Ferenc Deák and the leader of the centrists was Baron József Eötvös. The first session of the Diet was held on June 2, 1839.

== Electoral system ==
The Estates of the realm elected their envoys with a binding mandate, i.e. they voted according to their electors instructions. The ecclesiastical estate was represented by one or two envoy each from the cathedral chapters and abbeys (29 people), the county nobility was represented by two envoys each from the Hungarian and Slavonian counties (96+6 people); the citizens of the royal free cities were represented by one or two envoys per city (70 people) and the privileged residents of the autonomous entities (Jassic–Cuman District, Land of the Hajduk, Fiume, Turopolje, Croatia) were represented by one or two envoys each (8 people). The Croatian envoys elected by the Sabor. The envoys voted by contingent election per Estates. The counties cast one vote per county (51), the others one vote per estates (7).

Votes in the contingent election

Estates	Seats	Votes
Hungarian counties	96	48
Slavonian counties	6	3
Royal free cities	70	1
Cathedral chapters and abbeys	29	1
Sabor of Croatia	2	1
Jassic–Cuman District	2	1
Land of the Hajduk	2	1
Corpus separatum (Fiume)	1	1
Noble Municipality of Turopolje	1	1

== Results ==
Party	Votes	%	Seats	+/–
Conservatives	23	39.66	72	+4
Reformers	22	37.93	112	-4
Centrists	13	22.41	25	-7
Total	58	100.00	209	–
Source: Kecskeméti

"Votes" indicate the number of votes cast by envoys during the contingent election in the above table.

== The activity of the parliament ==
The Diet decided on the amount of the Hungarian military reinforcement in the imperial army and the tax collection, therefore, according to the instructions of the counties, these were not to be voted on until the amnesty for the reformers was granted. The State Conference finally backed down against the demands of the reformers and in 1840, Baron Miklós Wesselényi, László Lovassy and Lajos Kossuth were released. The Diet accepted the right of the serfs to buy their freedom from their landlords, permitted the establishment of joint-stock companies and factories, regulated the operation of trade, and created the possibility of lending by permitting the issuance of promissory notes. Jews were allowed to settle and engage in industry freely. The Hungarian-language Pest Theatre, founded in 1837, was made state-maintained and renamed the National Theatre. A committee operating during the parliamentary recess was established to draft a new criminal code.The last session of the Diet was held on May 13, 1840.
