= 1847 Hungarian parliamentary election =

- August 1847

All 205 seats in the Diet 57–151 seats needed for a majority
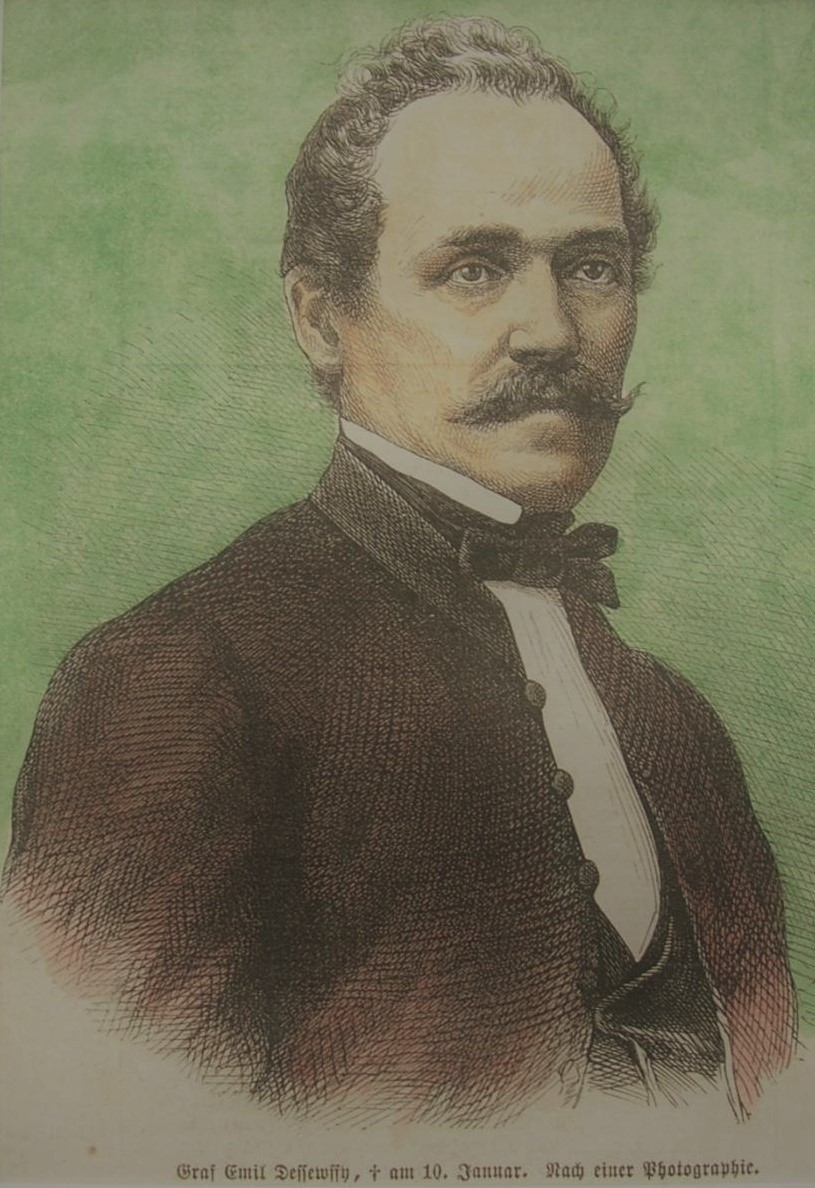

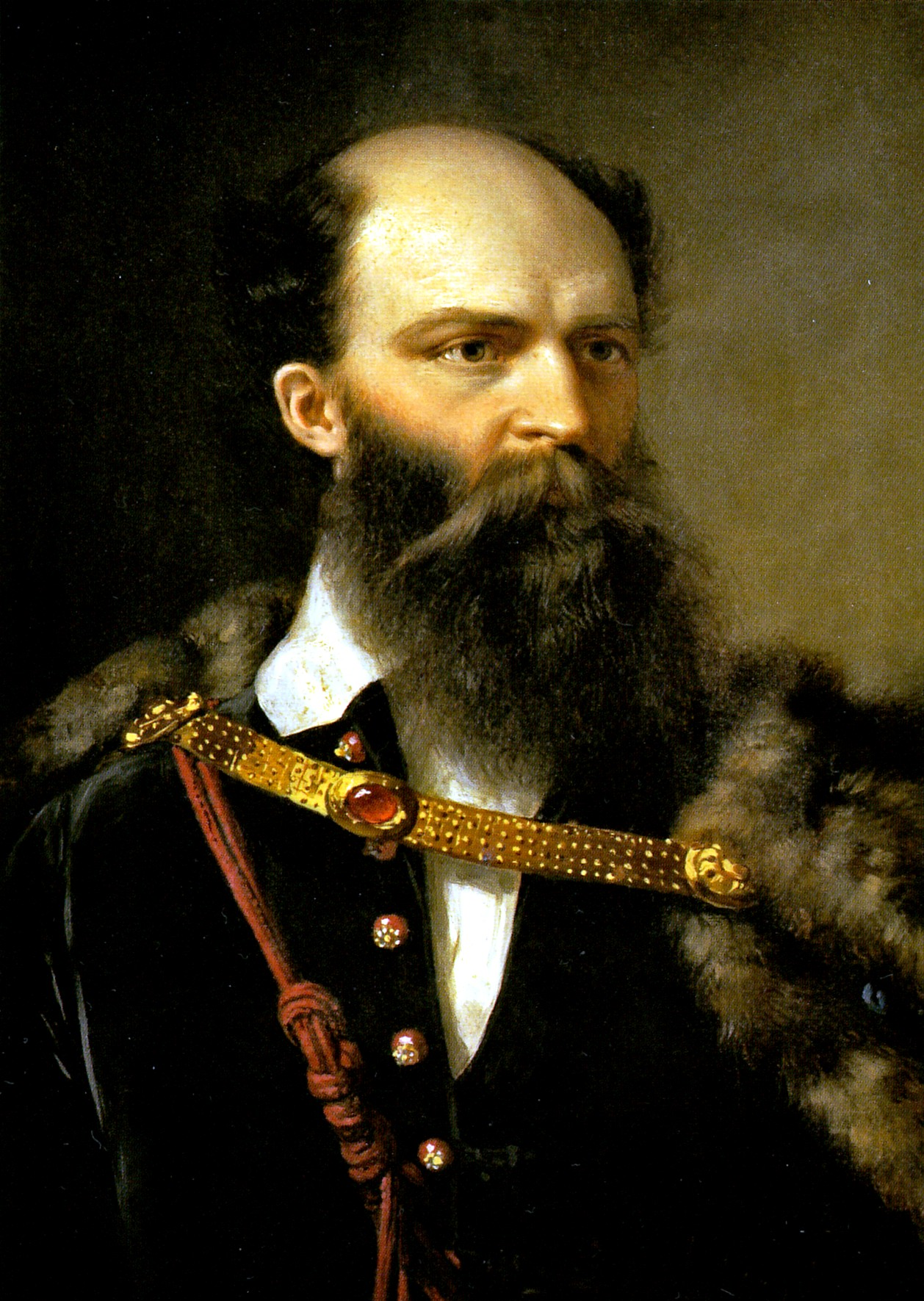
	First party	Second party
Leader	Emil Dessewffy	Lajos Batthyány
Party	KP	EP
Seats won	66 / 205	112 / 205
Seat change	▲2	▼4
Percentage	32.20%	54.63%
Cont. votes	22 / 56	20 / 56
Votes change	▲3	▼1
Contingent %	39,29%	35,71%

Parliamentary elections were held in the Kingdom of Hungary, Croatia and Slavonia in August 1847. The Diet of Hungary was elected according to the rules three years after the dissolution of the previous Diet. The aim of the government's policy was to gain a majority in the parliament, so county administrators were appointed to ensure the loyalty of the counties to the government, even by armed means. The Conservative Party was founded at Buda in 1846, under the leadership of Count Emil Dessewffy, which was the first modern party with a program in Hungary. The party distanced itself from the reformists and stood in favor of supporting the government. In response, the Opposition Party was founded by the reformist at Pest in 1847 under the leadership of Count Lajos Batthyány, The party's program was published under the name of the Opposition Statement and called for the constitutional transformation of the Austrian Empire. The imperial government unanimously rejected the reform efforts of both the Hungarian reformist and the nationalist movements. The Croatian nationalists were the only ones to gain the support of the imperial government because they protested against the introduction of the Hungarian language in the Croatian Governorate in 1844. The People's Party supported the Hungarian conservatives. At the Croatian county assemblies, border guards appeared armed to ensure a nationalist majority. 17 people died in a clash between the army and armed nationalists at the Zagreb county assembly in 1845. The Serbian Minister of the Interior, Ilija Garašanin, prepared a secret memorandum (Načertanije) in 1844 to proposing the creation of the Greater Serbia in the territories inhabited by all South Slavic ethnic groups living in the Ottoman and Habsburg Empires, and in this spirit, ambassadors and agents were sent to promote the plan in Hungary, thus laying the foundation for the later Serbian uprising. The Romanian Eftimie Murgu, who advocated the transformation of the Banat into a separate province, was imprisoned for sedition and separatism in 1845 and was released only 3 years later. He was the only nationalist politician sentenced to prison during the Hungarian Reform Era. The first session of the new Diet was held on November 11, 1847.

== Parties and leaders ==
Party	Leader
Conservative Party (KP)	Emil Dessewffy
Opposition Party (EP)	Lajos Batthyány

== Electoral system ==
The Estates of the realm elected their envoys with a binding mandate, i.e. they voted according to their electors' instructions. The ecclesiastical estate was represented by one or two envoy each from the cathedral chapters and abbeys (25 people), the county nobility was represented by two envoys each from the Hungarian and Slavonian counties (92+6 people); the citizens of the royal free cities were represented by two envoys per city (72 people) and the privileged residents of the autonomous entities (Jassic–Cuman District, Land of the Hajduk, Fiume–Bakar, Turopolje, Croatia) were represented by one or two envoys each (10 people). The Croatian envoys elected by the Sabor. The royal free city of Bakar (Szádvár) voted together with Fiume, and not with the other royal free cities. The envoys voted by contingent election per Estates. The counties cast one vote per county (49), the others one vote per estates (7).

Votes in the contingent election

Estates	Seats	Votes
Hungarian counties	92	46
Slavonian counties	6	3
Royal free cities	72	1
Cathedral chapters and abbeys	25	1
Fiume and Bakar	3	1
Sabor of Croatia	2	1
Jassic–Cuman District	2	1
Land of the Hajduk	2	1
Noble Municipality of Turopolje	1	1

== Results ==
Party	Votes	%	Seats	+/–
Conservative Party	22	39.29	66	+2
Opposition Party	20	35.71	110	-4
Centrists	14	25.00	29	-3
Total	56	100.00	205	–
Source: Kecskeméti

"Votes" indicate the number of votes cast by envoys during the contingent election in the above table.

== Role in the Hungarian Revolution ==
The conservatives sought to divide the opposition in the Diet, which resulted in a gridlock. However, upon news of the French Revolution, Lajos Kossuth demanded in a petition on March 3, 1848, that a constitution be issued for the Austrian Empire and a Hungarian government be appointed. The House of Magnates accepted Lajos Kossuth's petition on March 14, 1848 and 3 days later the king appointed Archduke Stephen as Palatine and Count Lajos Batthyány as Prime Minister of Hungary. The Diet adopted the April Laws, among which the State Conference (Staatskonferenz) wanted to amend the laws on the abolition of serf services and the Hungarian government. The State Conference insisted on maintaining the Hungarian Royal Chancellery and on the monarch's broad powers in military matters. In negotiations between March 24 and March 31, Count István Széchenyi and Baron József Eötvös managed to get the State Conference to back down. The king accepted the expansion of the Palatine's power, abolished the Hungarian Royal Chancellery, and could only decide with the acceptant of the Minister in Royal Court in military matters. The Hungarian government accepted the maintenance of the Military Frontier, but at the same time they refused to take over the imperial state debt proportionally and insisted on union with Transylvania. The king ratified the 31 laws and handed them over to the Palatine in Bratislava on April 11, the ministers took their oath before King Ferdinand V, who dissolved the Diet. Based on the adopted laws, the National Assembly was moved from Bratislava to Pest, which could only be dissolved after the adoption of the following year's budget. The new Parliament was elected on the basis of expanded suffrage.
