= 1832 Hungarian parliamentary election =

- November 1832

All 216 seats in the Diet 57–162 seats needed for a majority
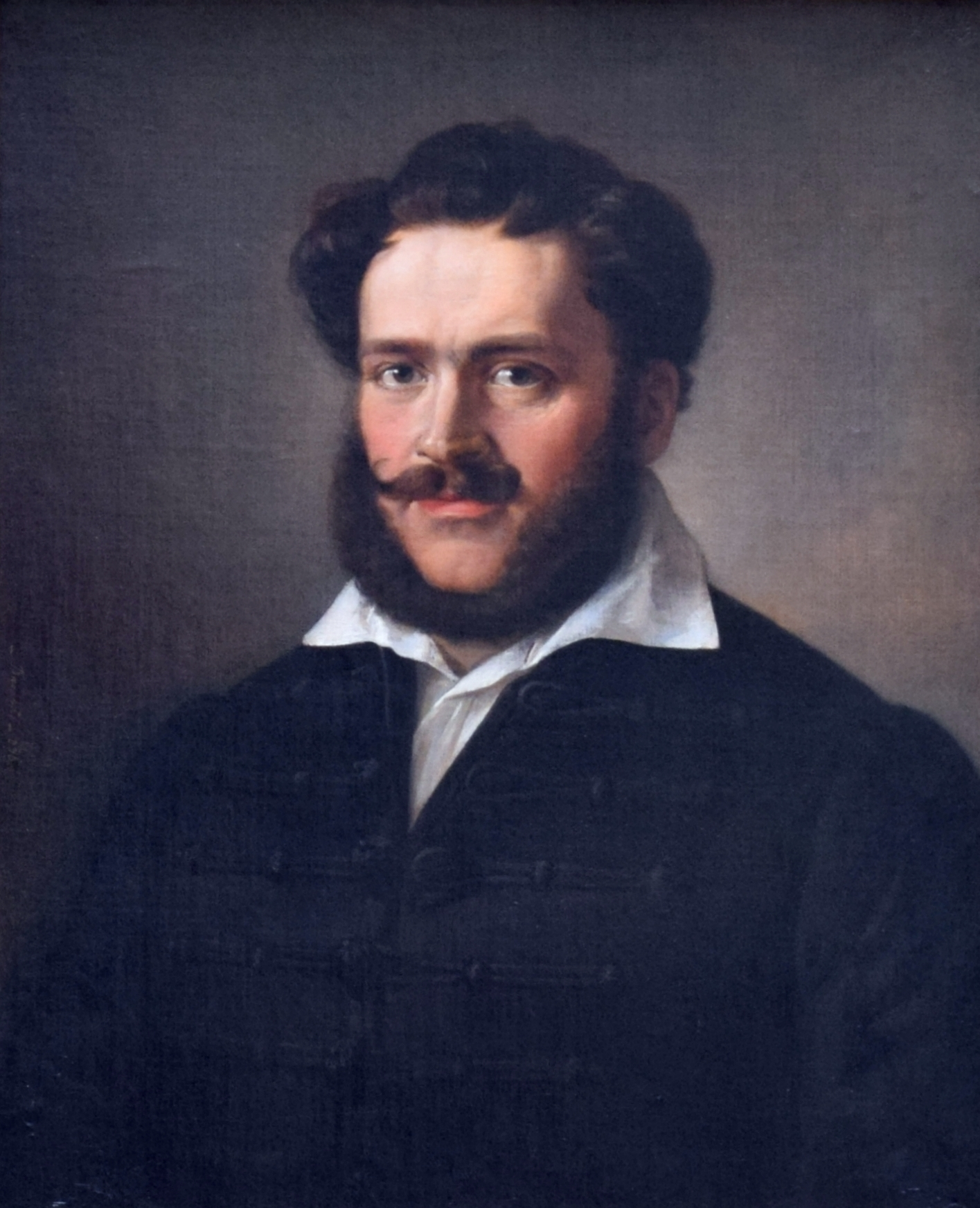

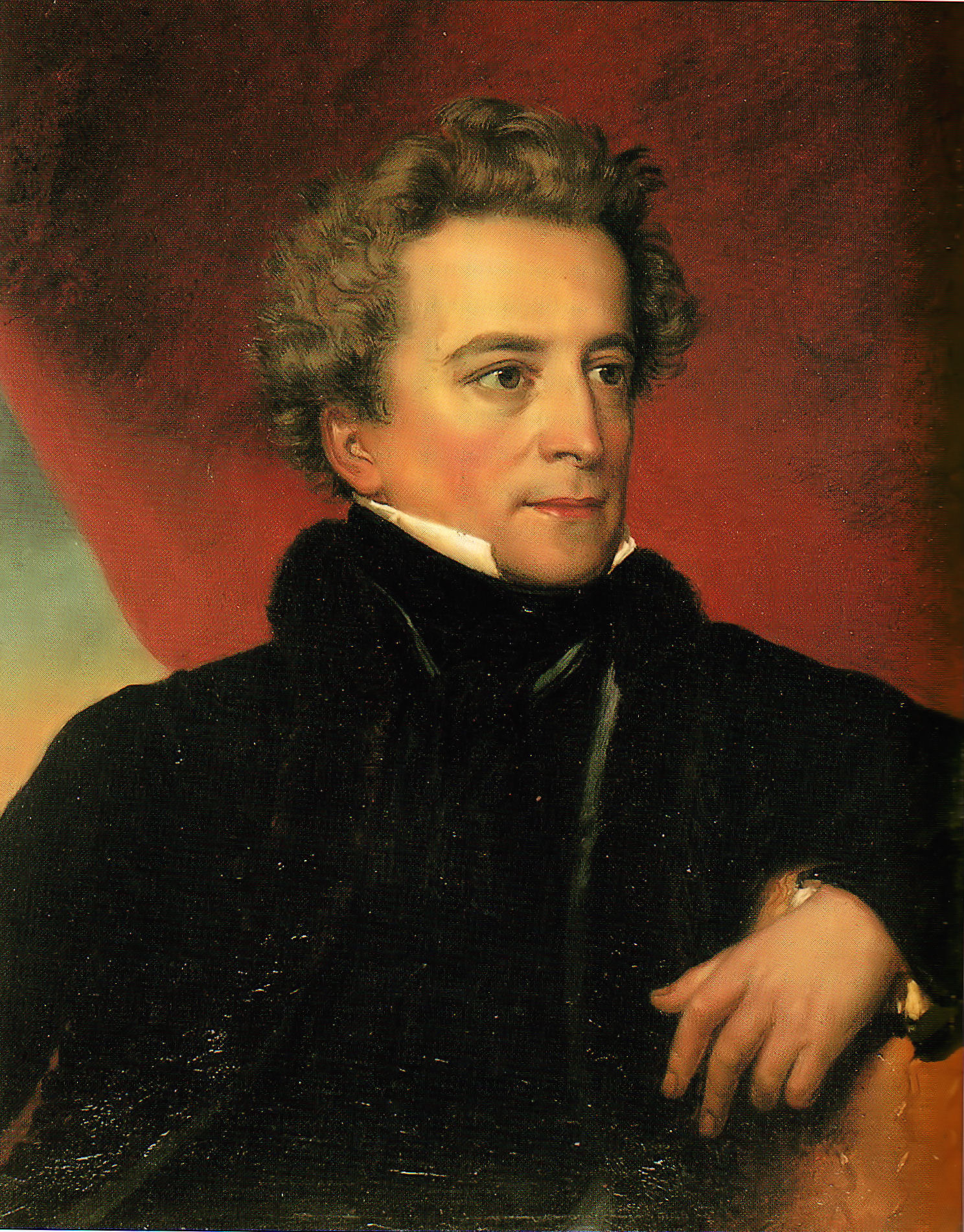
	First party	Second party
Leader	Miklós Wesselényi	József Dessewffy
Party	Reformers	Conservatives
Seats won	116 / 216	68 / 216
Seat change	unknown	unknown
Percentage	53.70%	31.48%
Cont. votes	21 / 56	19 / 56
Votes change	unknown	unknown
Contingent %	37,50%	33,93%

Parliamentary elections were held in the Kingdom of Hungary, Croatia and Slavonia in November 1832. The Diet of Hungary was elected after the dissolution of the short parliament of 1830. This was the longest parliament of the Reform Era. The committees that reviewed the reports of the Royal Deputations (Deputatio Regnicolaris) sent their reports to the counties in 1831, who formulated their positions. However, the parliament planned for October 1831 was postponed to the following year due to the cholera epidemic. The health restrictions caused misunderstandings in the Northern counties, what caused the Cholera uprising. The uprising repressed by the nobles army, then the judging courts sentenced 119 rebbellist to death. The parliament changed its position on Galicia after the suppression of the Polish uprising. They had asked the monarch to annex the province to the Hungarian crown before 1831, but from then on, they expected diplomatic steps from the ruler to help restore the autonomy of the Kingdom of Poland. The election mostly influenced by the Hitel (Credit, 1830) and Világ (World, 1831) entitled works of Count István Széchenyi, what caused the reformist victory. The first session of the Diet was held on December 16, 1832.

== Electoral system ==
The Estates of the realm elected their envoys with a binding mandate, i.e. they voted according to their electors instructions. The ecclesiastical estate was represented by one or two envoy each from the cathedral chapters and abbeys (33 people), the county nobility was represented by two envoys each from the Hungarian and Slavonian counties (92+6 people); the citizens of the royal free cities were represented by one or two envoys per city (76 people) and the privileged residents of the autonomous entities (Jassic–Cuman District, Land of the Hajduk, Fiume, Turopolje, Croatia) were represented by one or two envoys each (9 people). The Croatian envoys elected by the Sabor. The envoys voted by contingent election per Estates. The counties cast one vote per county (49), the others one vote per estates (7).

Votes in the contingent election

Estates	Seats	Votes
Hungarian counties	92	46
Slavonian counties	6	3
Royal free cities	76	1
Cathedral chapters and abbeys	33	1
Sabor of Croatia	2	1
Jassic–Cuman District	2	1
Land of the Hajduk	2	1
Corpus separatum (Fiume)	2	1
Noble Municipality of Turopolje	1	1

== Results ==
Party	Votes	%	Seats	+/–
Reformers	21	37.50	116	NA
Conservatives	19	33.93	68	NA
Centrists	16	28.57	32	NA
Total	56	100.00	216	–
Source: Kecskeméti

"Votes" indicate the number of votes cast by envoys during the contingent election in the above table.

== The activity of the parliament ==
The demands of the reformers appeared in 1833: Count István Széchenyi proposed the creation of 12 laws in his work entitled Stádium, while Baron Miklós Wesselényi wrote about his ideas in his work Prejudices (Balítéletek). However, they only opposed the conservative majority on the upper house, led by Count József Dessewffy, while Ferenc Kölcsey became the leader of the reformers on the lower house. The lawyer Lajos Kossuth, who was present at the public sessions of the parliament, published a manuscript about the speeches he had written down, entitled Parliamentary reports (Országgyűlési tudósítások), which was sent to the 150 subscribers as a private letter. The work of the Diet began with the settlement of the serf question at the king's suggestion. Over the years, the reformers put forward several proposals for the perpetual redemption of serf services, the abolition of the manorial courts, the guarantee of the personal rights of serfs, the abolition of the church tithe, and the remedying of the grievances of Protestants. The proposals were voted on by the lower house of the Diet, then rejected by the upper house, and if a proposal was nevertheless accepted by the upper house, King Francis I vetoed it. The serfs were only given the opportunity to exchange the serf plot under their management, they continued to be in the possession of the landlord. The king used administrative means to persuade the counties to change the envoy orders in 1834. Ferenc Kölcsey did not agree with the new envoy order and therefore resigned from his mandate. And Ferenc Deák became the new leader of the opposition. After the death of Francis I in 1835, the Parliament did not accept the new ruler as Ferdinand I, but insisted on the serial numbering of the Hungarian kings and recognized him as Ferdinand V, indicating that the Kingdom of Hungary was not an integred part of the Austrian Empire. Before the Parliament was dissolved in 1836, the language of the laws was changed from Latin to Hungarian. The last session of the Diet was held on May 2, 1836.
