= 1830 Hungarian parliamentary election =

- August 1830

All 213 seats in the Diet 57–159 seats needed for a majority
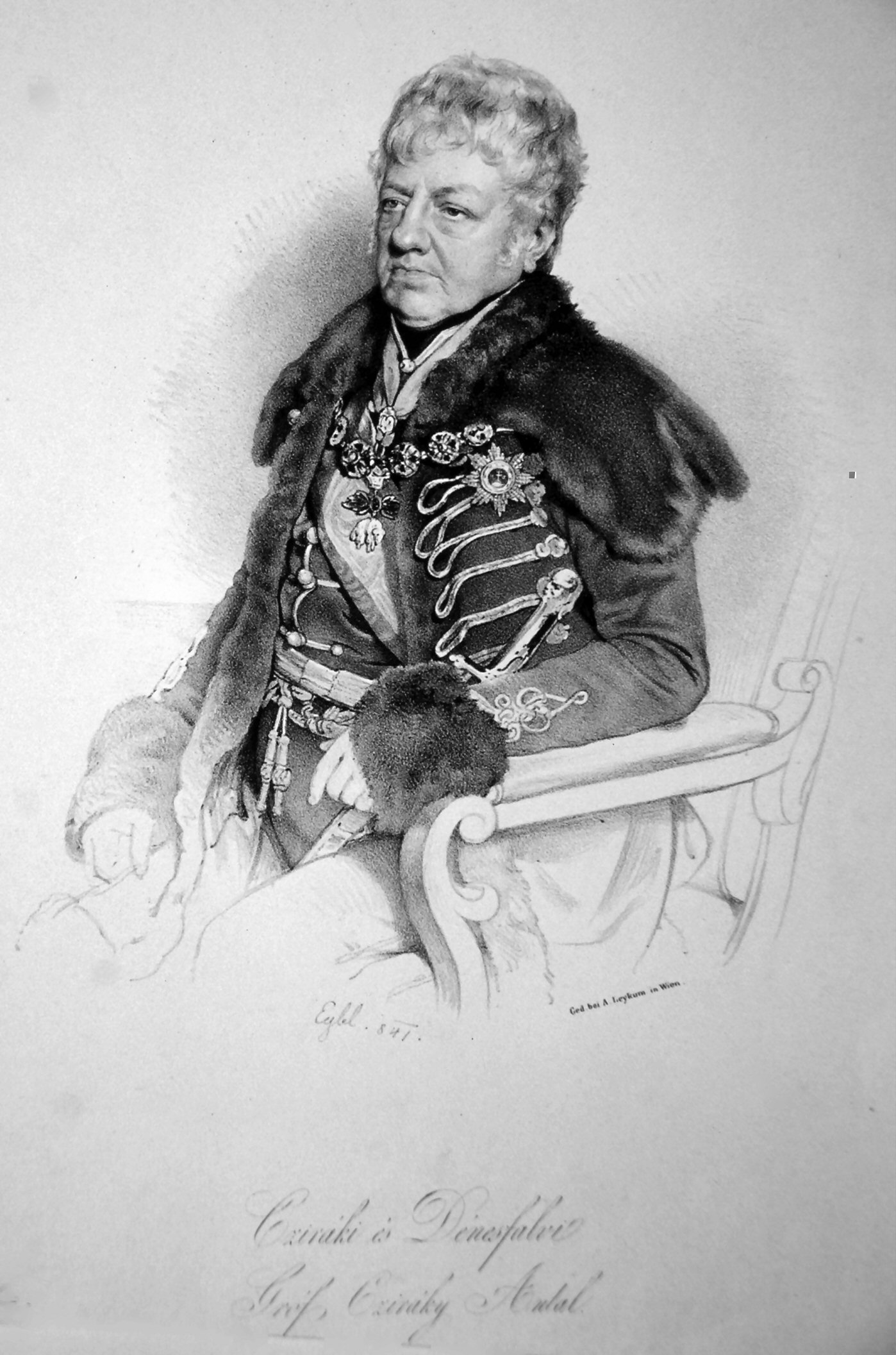

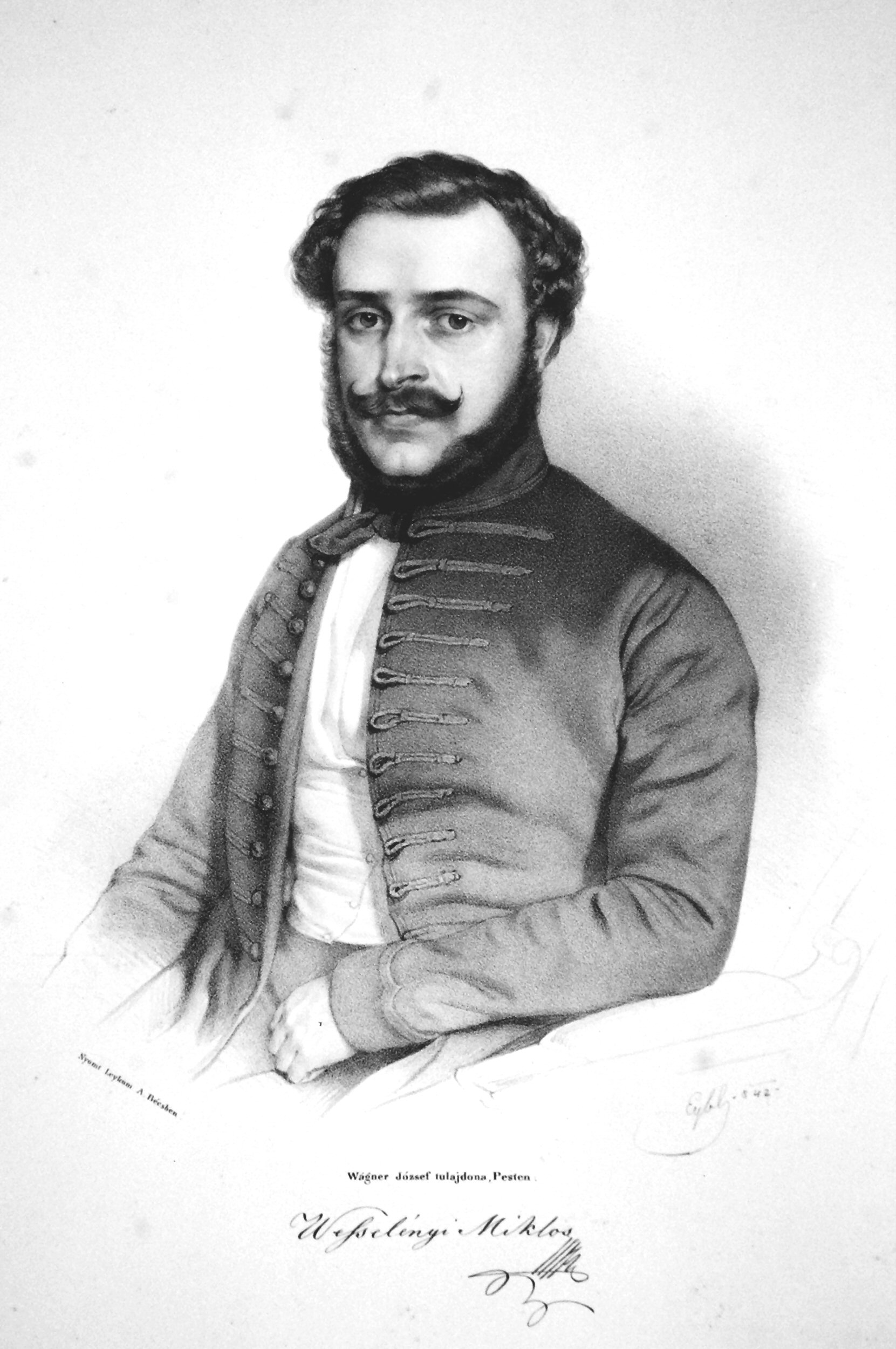
	First party	Second party
Leader	Antal Cziráky	Miklós Wesselényi
Party	Conservatives	Reformers
Seats won	approx. 104	approx. 109
Contingent votes	approx. 38	approx. 18

Parliamentary elections were held in the Kingdom of Hungary, Croatia and Slavonia in August 1830. The Diet of Hungary was elected according to the rules three years after the dissolution of the previous Diet. Correspondence between the counties became possible after 1827, which made coordinated political action possible. The leader and organizer of the reform movement was Baron Miklós Wesselényi, who created a legal and open political movement. Wesselényi believed that the framework of the parliament was suitable for the reformers to gain a majority by winning over the county nobility and to bring their reform ideas to success within a legal framework without a revolution. If politics became impossible in national level, the opposition would retreat to the county assemblies and reorganize itself from there. Committees reviewed the reports of the formal Royal Deputations (Deputatio Regnicolaris) and made the reports about it. But the reformers were not satisfied with either the composition of the committees or their proposals. The committee reports could not be discussed at the Diet either, because there was no time to officially send their results to the counties. King Francis I brought forward the opening of the Diet due to the July Revolution in France, because he needed to supplement the army with recruits. The monarch also wanted to present the loyalty of the nobility by crowning the heir to the throne, Archduke Ferdinand. The first session of the Diet was held on September 8, 1830.

== Electoral system ==
The Estates of the realm elected their envoys with a binding mandate, i.e. they voted according to their electors instructions. The ecclesiastical estate was represented by one or two envoy each from the cathedral chapters and abbeys (31 people), the county nobility was represented by two envoys each from the Hungarian and Slavonian counties (92+6 people); the citizens of the royal free cities were represented by one or two envoys per city (75 people) and the privileged residents of the autonomous entities (Jassic–Cuman District, Land of the Hajduk, Fiume, Turopolje, Croatia) were represented by one or two envoys each (9 people). The Croatian envoys elected by the Sabor. The envoys voted by contingent election per Estates. The counties cast one vote per county (49), the others one vote per estates (7).

Votes in the contingent election

Estates	Seats	Votes
Hungarian counties	92	46
Slavonian counties	6	3
Royal free cities	75	1
Cathedral chapters and abbeys	31	1
Sabor of Croatia	2	1
Jassic–Cuman District	2	1
Land of the Hajduk	2	1
Corpus separatum (Fiume)	2	1
Noble Municipality of Turopolje	1	1

== Results ==
In this Diet, it is difficult to determine which of the delegates belong to the reformers and which to the conservatives, because due to the shortness of time, no substantive debate developed between the two sides. The opposition refrained from open confrontation, given the solemnity of the coronation and the need to demonstrate the power of the Habsburg monarchy. Traditionally, the envoys of the cathedral chapters and abbeys, Croatia, Slavonia and Turopolje sided with the conservatives and the royal free cities and Hajduk sided with the reformers. Approximately 16 Hungarian counties could have sided with the reformers. Based on this, it can be assumed that there were 109 reformer and 104 conservative envoys. This could have meant that the Conservatives were given a 38-18 majority in the contingent elections, where the 213 envoys had 56 votes. In the Diet, the leader of the conservatives can be considered Count Antal Cziráky, and the leader of the reformers is Baron Miklós Wesselényi.

== The activity of the parliament ==
In accordance with the will of the monarch, the Parliament was tasked with the coronation of the heir to the throne, Archduke Ferdinand. The events of the revolutions in Brussels and Paris made the reforms without revolution more acceptable to the nobility in the future. Parliament passed 17 laws, including limiting military service to 10 years and supplementing the army with recruits. The language of justice and administration changed from Latin to Hungarian. But the discussion of the main reform ideas was postponed to the next Parliament, which King Francis I promised to convene the following year. The last session of the Diet was held on December 20, 1830.
