= 1843 Hungarian parliamentary election =

- April 1843

All 210 seats in the Diet 57–156 seats needed for a majority
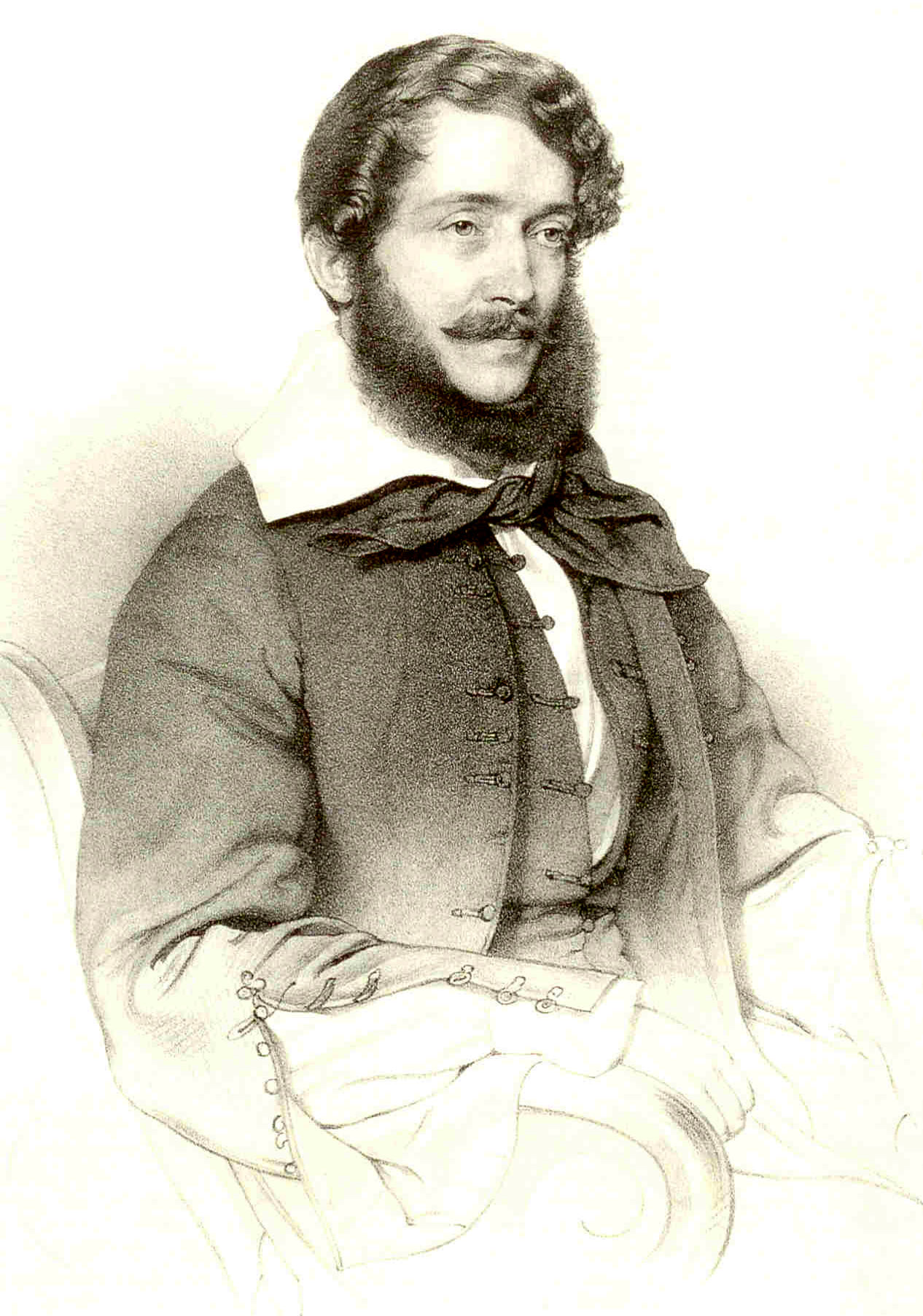

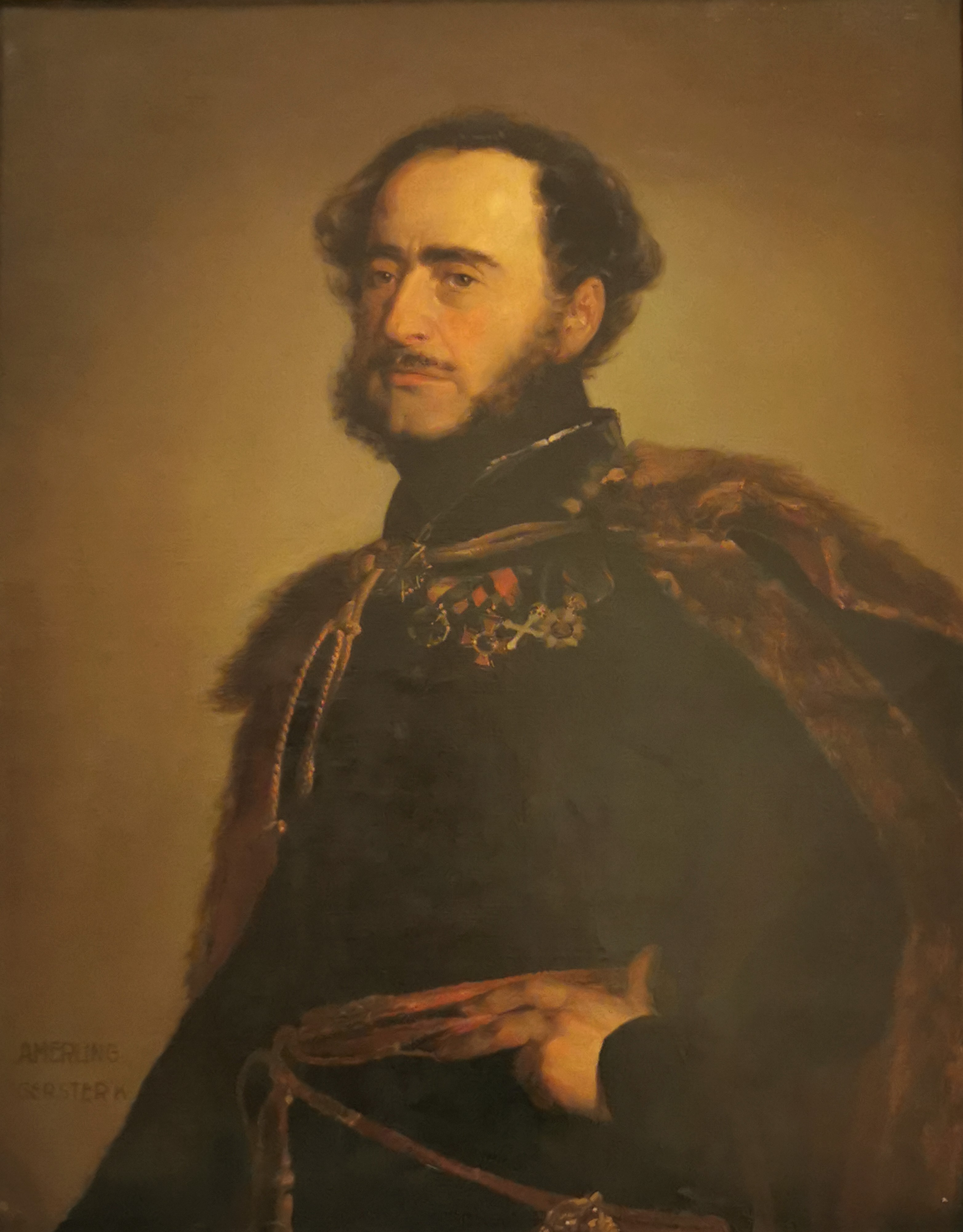
	First party	Second party
Leader	Lajos Kossuth	István Széchenyi
Party	Reformers	Conservatives
Seats won	114 / 210	64 / 210
Seat change	▲2	▼8
Percentage	54.29%	30.48%
Cont. votes	21 / 56	19 / 56
Votes change	▼1	▼4
Contingent %	37,50%	33,93%

Parliamentary elections were held in the Kingdom of Hungary, Croatia and Slavonia in April 1843. The Diet of Hungary was elected according to the rules three years after the dissolution of the previous Diet. Lajos Kossuth, who had been convicted of a press offense, was released from prison in 1840 and became a leading politician of the opposition. The first political newspapers were launched in 1841, which laid the foundation for the political parties that would later emerge. The Pesti Hírlap, founded by the liberal Lajos Kossuth, and the Világ, founded by the conservative Count Aurél Dessewffy, provided the opportunity to unify the positions of people living in different parts of the country. The counties got to know each other's positions, which made it possible to issue unified envoy orders. After the death of Count Aurél Dessewffy in 1842, Count István Széchenyi wrote against Lajos Kossuth's editorials. Some of the reformers' ideas provoked protests from ethnic minorities. The official introduction of the Hungarian language as official language put Croatian nationalists on the side of the conservatives, while the proposal for a Protestant union between the Reformed and Lutheran churches provoked opposition mostly from Slovak Lutherans. A committee established by the Parliament by 1843, headed by Ferenc Deák, had created a new criminal code, in which it was proposed that persons of different legal status should receive the same punishment and that the death penalty should be abolished, and that courts should be decided by juries. However, Ferenc Deák did not participate in the work of the Parliament after he refused his mandate, because when he elected by the Zala County Assembly two people died. The first session of the Diet was held on May 14, 1843.

== Electoral system ==
The Estates of the realm elected their envoys with a binding mandate, i.e. they voted according to their electors instructions. The ecclesiastical estate was represented by one or two envoy each from the cathedral chapters and abbeys (29 people), the county nobility was represented by two envoys each from the Hungarian and Slavonian counties (92+6 people); the citizens of the royal free cities were represented by one or two envoys per city (73 people) and the privileged residents of the autonomous entities (Jassic–Cuman District, Land of the Hajduk, Fiume–Bakar, Turopolje, Croatia) were represented by one or two envoys each (10 people). The Croatian envoys elected by the Sabor. The royal free city of Bakar (Szádvár) voted together with Fiume, and not with the other royal free cities. The envoys voted by contingent election per Estates. The counties cast one vote per county (49), the others one vote per estates (7).

Votes in the contingent election

Estates	Seats	Votes
Hungarian counties	92	46
Slavonian counties	6	3
Royal free cities	73	1
Cathedral chapters and abbeys	29	1
Fiume and Bakar	3	1
Sabor of Croatia	2	1
Jassic–Cuman District	2	1
Land of the Hajduk	2	1
Noble Municipality of Turopolje	1	1

== Results ==
Party	Votes	%	Seats	+/–
Reformers	21	37.50	114	+2
Conservatives	19	33.93	64	-8
Centrists	16	28.57	32	+7
Total	56	100.00	210	–
Source: Kecskeméti

"Votes" indicate the number of votes cast by envoys during the contingent election in the above table.

== The activity of the parliament ==
The reformers were unable to get their carefully developed ideas accepted by the Diet. The parliament rejected the extension of county taxes to the nobility, and the trade and customs policy reforms. The criminal code created by the committee headed by Ferenc Deák was accepted by the lower house, but rejected by the upper house. The Diet accepted in 1844 that non-nobles could also hold office and own land, and they enacted a law for the full use of the Hungarian language in the state, and that secondary and higher education had to switch from Latin to Hungarian. The last session of the Diet was held on November 12, 1844.

== Aftermath ==
The introduction of the Hungarian language in schools was mostly opposed by the leader of the Slovak Evangelicals, Ľudovít Štúr, who established the Slovak National Newspaper (Slovenskje národňje novini) with the aim of elevating the Central Slovak dialect to a literary language. In order to act more effectively, the reformers established the Védegylet, which became the political organizer of the opposition, and its director was Lajos Kossuth. The conservatives, led by Count Emil Dessewffy, founded another newspaper called Budapesti Híradó.
