= 1825 Hungarian parliamentary election =

- August 1825

All 219 seats in the Diet 57–165 seats needed for a majority
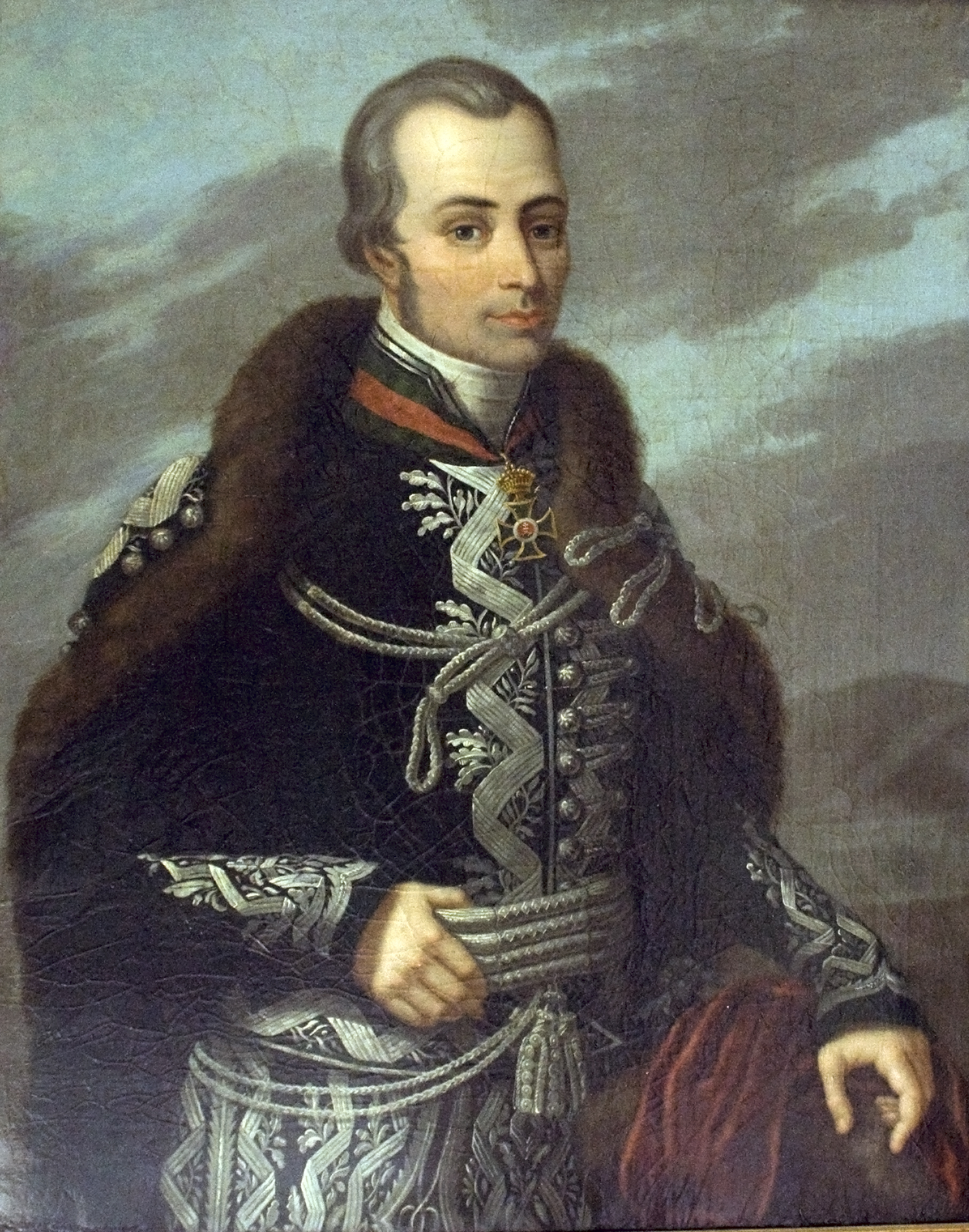

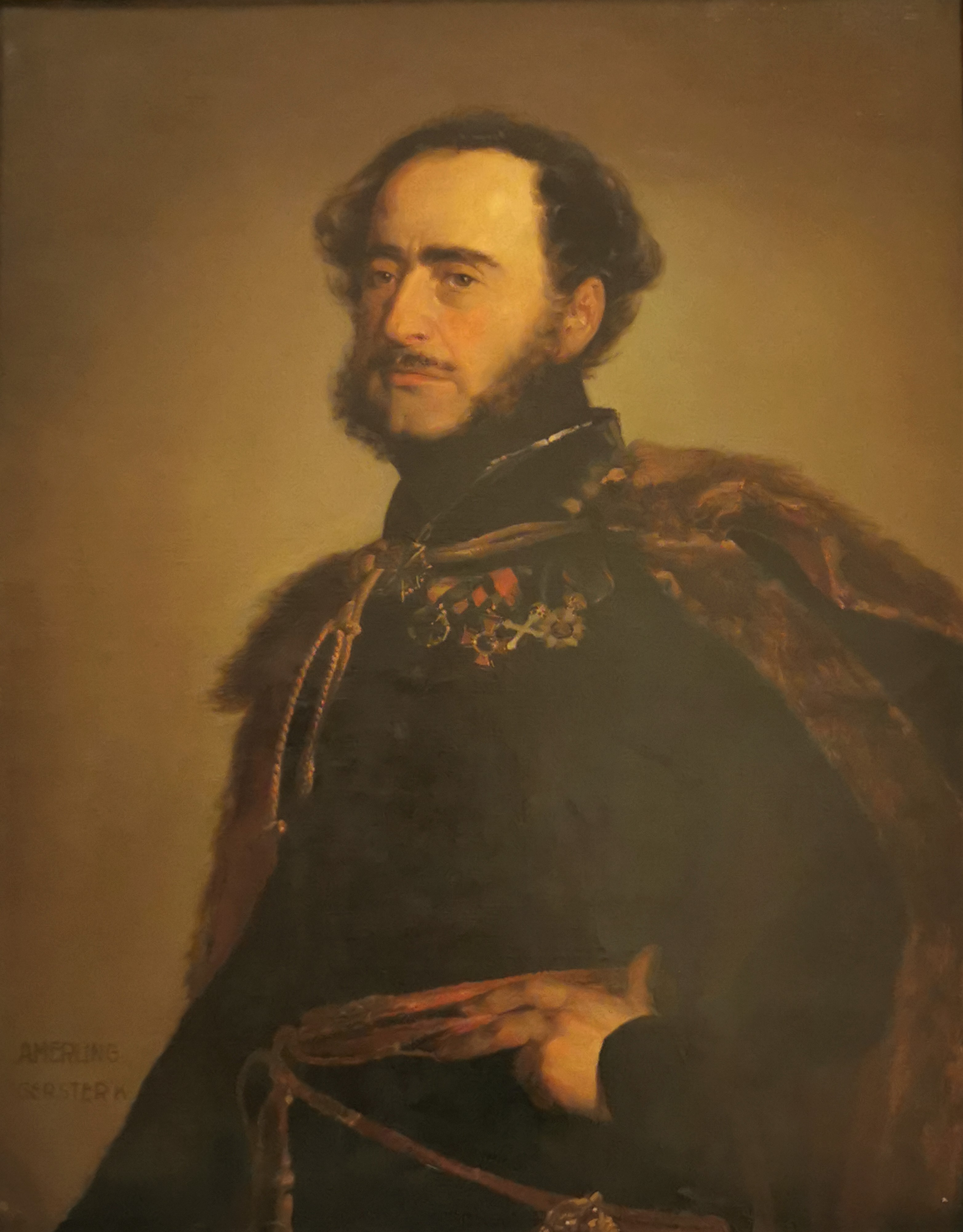
	First party	Second party
Leader	Zsigmond Szőgyény	István Széchenyi
Party	Royalists	Constitutionalists
Seats won	157 / 219	40 / 219
Seat change	unknown	unknown
Percentage	71.69%	18.27%
Cont. votes	25 / 56	20 / 56
Votes change	unknown	unknown
Contingent %	44,64%	35,71%

Parliamentary elections were held in the Kingdom of Hungary, Croatia and Slavonia in August 1825. The Diet of Hungary was elected according to the rules three years after the dissolution of the previous Diet. The counties of Bars, Komárom, Nyitra, Nógrád, Zala and Zemplén refused to collect taxes in 1823, so the monarch increased the burden of the counties willing to pay the tax by 2.5 times. The order of King Francis I only increased the resistance of the counties, so the Diet, which was solely competent in tax matters, had to be convened again. To maintain order, the king committed himself to holding the Diet and protecting the privileges of the nobility. Before the elections, the monarch ordered the counting of votes. Previously, most voters did not participate in the elections, because the vote was decided by the most influential high nobleman. However, with the counting of the votes, the campaign to win over the voters began. The first session of the Diet was held on September 11, 1825.

== Electoral system ==
The Estates of the realm elected their envoys with a binding mandate, i.e. they voted according to their electors instructions. The ecclesiastical estate was represented by one or two envoy each from the cathedral chapters and abbeys (37 people), the county nobility was represented by two envoys each from the Hungarian and Slavonian counties (92+6 people); the citizens of the royal free cities were represented by one or two envoys per city (75 people) and the privileged residents of the autonomous entities (Jassic–Cuman District, Land of the Hajduk, Fiume, Turopolje, Croatia) were represented by one or two envoys each (9 people). The Croatian envoys elected by the Sabor. The envoys voted by contingent election per Estates. The counties cast one vote per county (49), the others one vote per estates (7).

Votes in the contingent election

Estates	Seats	Votes
Hungarian counties	92	46
Slavonian counties	6	3
Royal free cities	75	1
Cathedral chapters and abbeys	37	1
Sabor of Croatia	2	1
Jassic–Cuman District	2	1
Land of the Hajduk	2	1
Corpus separatum (Fiume)	2	1
Noble Municipality of Turopolje	1	1

== Results ==
Since there were no parties in the elections and correspondence between counties was prohibited, it took time for it to become clear what position the envoys took on the issues that arose. In a letter written to Ferenc Kazinczy in 1826, the envoy of Zemplén County, Imre Barkassy, classified the envoys according to their views. Given that the envoy instructions had already been decided upon when the envoys were elected, the time delay cannot be considered a significant distorting factor. The belows based on that source.

Party	Votes	%	Seats	+/–
Royalists	25	44.64	157	NA
Constitutionalists	20	35.71	40	NA
Independents	11	19.64	22	NA
Total	56	100.00	219	–
Source: Bérenger–Kecskeméti

"Votes" indicate the number of votes cast by envoys during the contingent election in the above table.

== The activity of the parliament ==
The task of the Diet was to crown Queen consort Caroline Augusta, after which the Diet acted to protect its own constitutional rights. However, the lower house of the Diet was divided. In addition to the Magnates, the royal free cities, the church and the envoys of the Sabor were also royalists. The constitutionalists questioned the patriotism of the royalists, and the royalists questioned the loyalty of the opposition. Among the constitutionalists, Count István Széchenyi and Pál Nagy were the leaders. The royalists were led by Count Antal Cziráky, and Zsigmond Szőgyény, who was the chairman of the lower house. He violated the rules several times during the vote counting and counted the church and city delegates not together, but individually, in order to ensure the royalist majority. On November 3, 1825, Count István Széchenyi, Count György Károlyi, Count György Andrássy and Baron Ábrahám Vay offered donations for the establishment of a scientific academy at the Diet. The king accepted the wishes of the Diet in 1827 and authorized correspondence between the counties and the convening of the Diet in every three years, as well as the establishment of the Hungarian Academy of Sciences. Finally, the Diet wanted to review the reports prepared by the previous Royal Delegations (Deputatio Regnicolaris), which had made proposals for the transformation of the institutional system. Therefore, two new committees were established to submit their reports to the next Diet in 3 years. The last session of the Diet was held on August 18, 1827.
