= Laszló Lovassy =

Hungarian revolutionary (1815–1892)

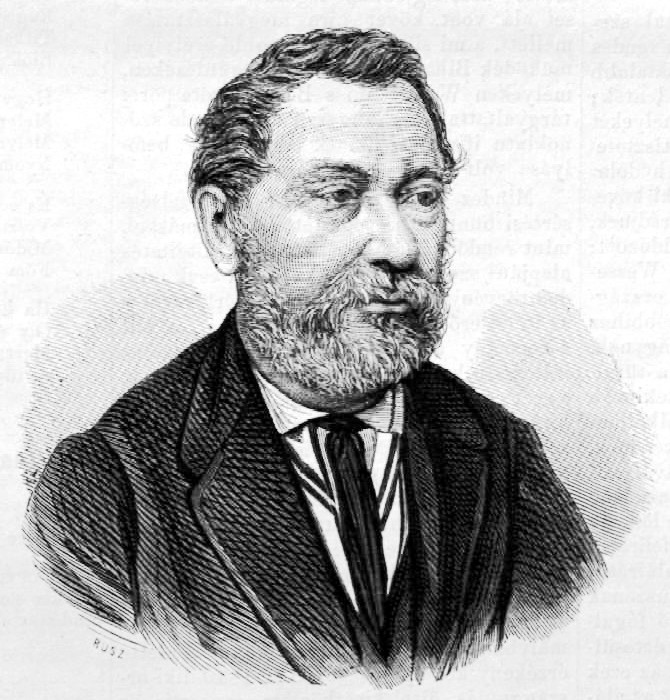
Lovassy László Portrait

László Lovassy (May 8, 1815 in Nagyszalonta, Hungary – January 6, 1892 in Nagyszalonta) was one of the leaders of the Hungarian Revolution of 1848.

His father was István Lovassy and his mother was Örzse Illéssy. After finishing his studies in Nagyvárad (mainly because of his father's influence) he decided to take up law. He therefore went to Pozsony to be the member of the dietal youth. He took part in the Diet of 1832-36 (with the help of his uncle, János Illéssy) as a law student.

At the meetings of the Lower House, more and more debates occurred among the youth and the conservative representatives, so Miklós Wesselényi advised the law students to establish a union, where they could discuss matters.

In 1834, on the model of the French Société des droits de l'homme the so-called ”Társalkodási Egyesület" was established in Pozsony, under the leadership of Lovassy. Their aim was the extension of human rights, but at the beginning they abstained from direct anti-governmental claims. They also dealt with several causes: e.g.: the case of the Hungarian language, the situation of the Polish, the case of peasantry, freedom of religion and speech.

Lovassy soon became the paragon of the youth demanding democratic reforms and constitutional independence. As Metternich was against these demonstrations, he replaced the then chancellor with Fidél Pálffy, who bore down on the dietal youth.

Lovassy was arrested May 30, 1836, together with József Madarász and Ferenc Pulszky. They were accused of high treason. Lovassy chose János Perger as his lawyer, but he thought that his trial was only a formality.

Probably he was right, as he and his supporters were sentenced to ten years in 1837.

István Lovassy persuaded his son to apply to the king for mercy, but Ferdinad V rejected the proposal, as he agreed with the sentence. Lovassy was taken to Spielberg, where he soon went insane because of the captivity. Due to this, he was given a pardon in 1840. After his release he was treated in Pozsony for more than 18 years, after which he settled at Erdőgyarak, where he lived for more than 20 years.

A little before his death he moved to Nagyszalonta, where he died January 6, 1892, at the age of 76.

On his tomb:

Lovassy László

született: 1815. május 8
meghalt: 1892. január 6
Életéről a történelem beszél

Áldás és béke dicső emlékezetén
