= Vukojevac =

Village in Turopolje, Croatia

Coordinates: 45°36′13″N 16°7′8″E

Vukojevac is a village in the region of Turopolje south of Zagreb, the capital of Croatia. It is situated on the eastern slopes of the Vukomeričke gorice hills and about halfway between Zagreb and Sisak adjacent to the road that connected the ancient Roman towns of Poetovio and Siscia. The village is divided into Gornji Vukojevac (Upper Vukojevac) with 75 residents and Donji Vukojevac (Lower Vukojevac) with 468 residents (2001). It is part of the Lekenik municipality of the Sisak-Moslavina County.
