= Aurél Dessewffy =

Hungarian journalist (1808–1842)

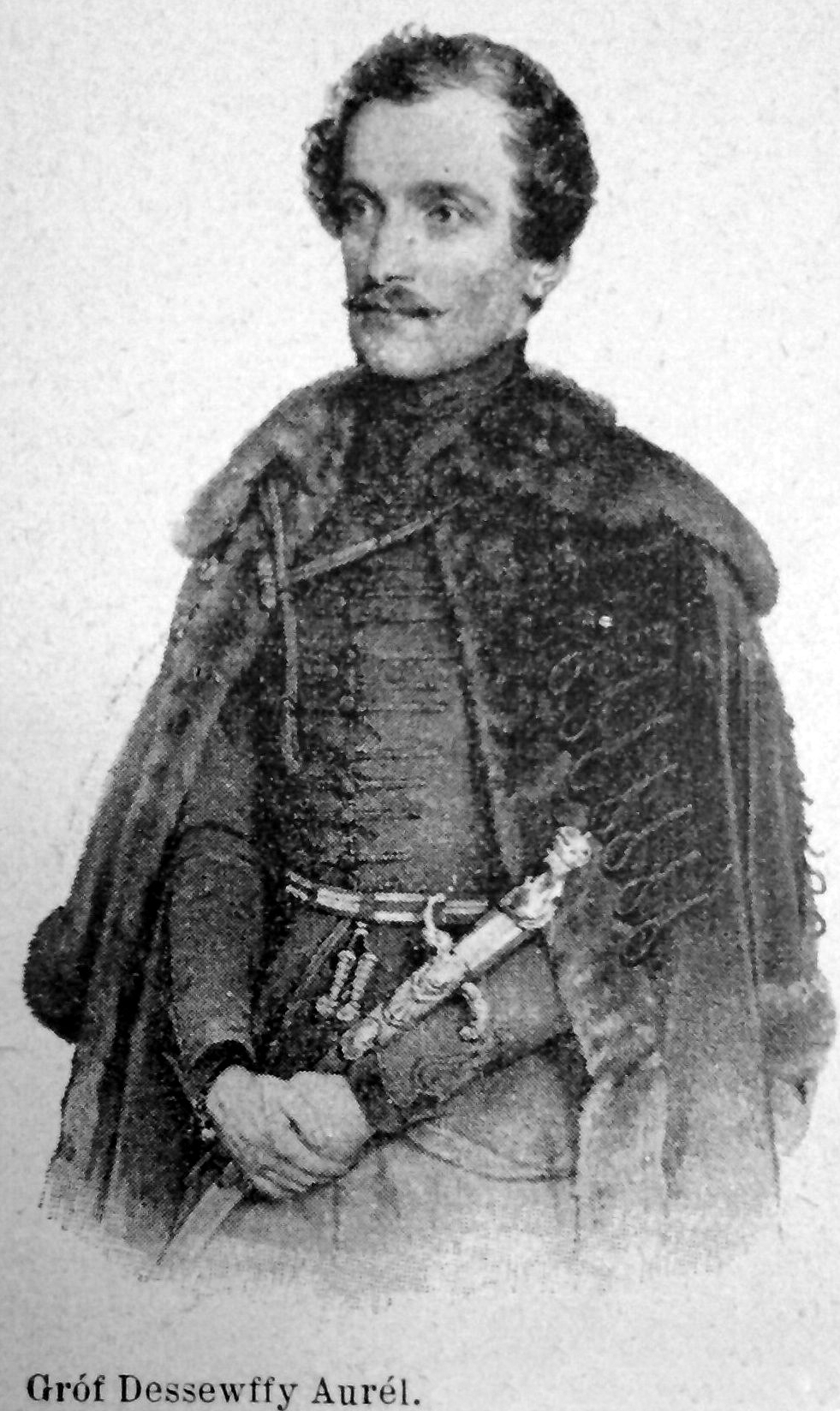
Count Aurél Dessewffy

For the Speaker of the House of Magnates see Aurél Dessewffy (1846–1928).

Count Aurél Dessewffy de Csernek et Tarkeő (Hungarian: cserneki és tarkeői gróf Dessewffy Aurél; 1808–1842), was a Hungarian journalist and politician, the eldest son of Count József Dessewffy and Eleonóra Sztáray. He was born in Michalovce, Zemplén County, Kingdom of Hungary.

Carefully educated at his father's house, he was accustomed to the best society of his day. While still a child, he could declaim most of the Iliad in Greek without a book, and read and quoted Tacitus with enthusiasm. Under the noble influence of Ferenc Kazinczy he became acquainted with the chief masterpieces of European literature in their original tongues. He was particularly fond of the English, and one of his early idols was Jeremy Bentham. He regularly accompanied his father to the diets of which he was a member, take the courses of the debates, of which he kept a journal, and made the acquaintance of the great István Széchenyi, who encouraged his aspirations.

On leaving college, he entered the royal Aulic chancellery, and in 1832 was appointed secretary of the royal stadtholder at Buda. The same year he turned his attention to politics and was regarded as one of the most promising young orators of the day, especially during the sessions of the diet of 1832-1836, when he had the courage to oppose Lajos Kossuth. At the Pressburg diet in 1840, Dessewffy was already the leading orator of the more enlightened and progressive Conservatives, but incurred great unpopularity for not going far enough, with the result that he was twice defeated at the polls. But his reputation in court circles was increasing; he was appointed a member of the committee for the reform of the criminal law in 1840; and, the same year with a letter of recommendation from Metternich in his pocket, visited England and France, the Netherlands and Belgium, made the acquaintance of Thiers and Heine in Paris, and returned home with an immense and precious store of practical information. He at once proceeded to put fresh life into the despondent and irresolute Conservative party, and the Magyar aristocracy, by combating in the Világ the opinions of Kossuth's paper, the Pesti Hirlap. But the multiplicity of his labors was too much for his feeble physique, and he died on 9 February 1842, at the very time when his talents seemed most indispensable.
