= Secret State Conference =

Political body of the Austrian Empire

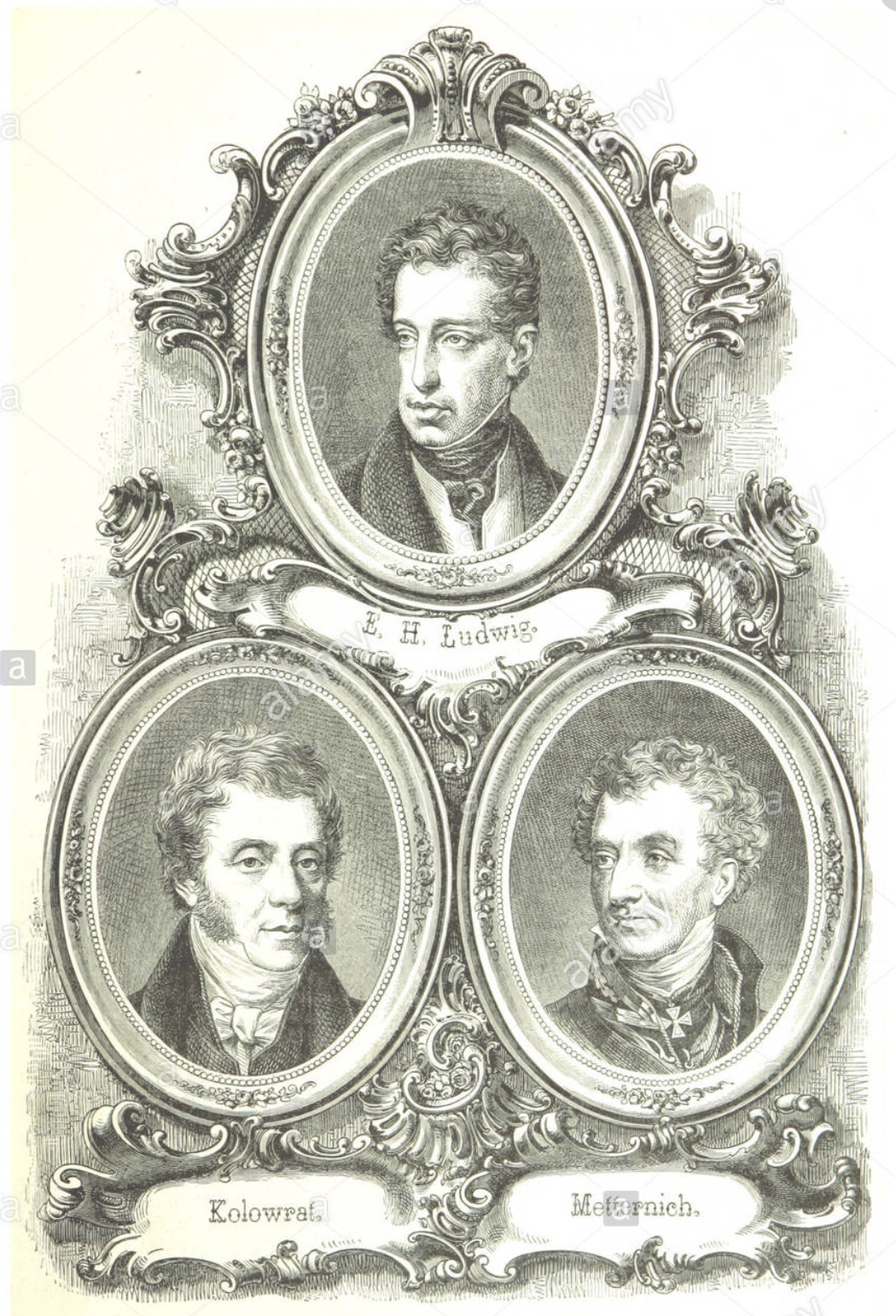
Secret State Conference the empire's de facto government from 1836 to 1848.

The Secret State Conference (German: Geheime Staatskonferenz) was the de jure advisory body to Emperor Ferdinand I of Austria and the de facto ruling cabinet of the Austrian Empire from 1836 to 1848, during the Vormärz era.

== Establishment ==
When Emperor Francis I of Austria died on 2 March 1835, his incapable son Ferdinand I succeeded to the throne. To preserve the Austrian autocratic system, Francis had taken precautions, and his last will ordered the establishment of a Secret State Conference. The panel held its constituent meeting on 12 December 1836.

== Members ==
- Archduke Louis, chairman
- Archduke Franz Karl
- State Chancellor Prince Klemens von Metternich
- Minister Count Franz Anton von Kolowrat-Liebsteinsky

The composition represented a compromise between the ruling House of Habsburg-Lorraine and its ministers: Archduke Louis was brother of late Emperor Francis I, Archduke Karl was the brother of Ferdinand I, Metternich was responsible for foreign affairs and Kolowrat was responsible for domestic policy and finances. Metternich became the symbol of reaction and conservatism, but Kolowrat was considered liberal.

== Dissolution ==
The Secret State Conference's activities were overshadowed by the hostilities between Chancellor Metternich and his rival Kolowrat that finally led to the outbreak of the Revolution of 1848. Metternich was forced to resign and fled to England, and Kolowrat was appointed first Minister-President of Austria on March 20 but held the office for only a month.
