= Hungarian Reform Era =

The Hungarian Reform Era was a period of Hungarian history in the 19th century characterized by a distancing from Habsburg rule. Its beginning was marked by the reconvening of the Diet of Hungary of 1825 and the foundation of the Hungarian Academy of Sciences, later ending with the Hungarian Revolution in 1848.

== Antecedents ==
In line with other upheavals in 1848, the ideas of nationalism and liberalism had spread to Hungary. The feudal system of Hungary held it back economically compared to its neighbors, and as such officials moved to modernize the Hungarian government and economy.

In István Széchenyi's book, Credit, the ideas of the abolition of antiquity and the elimination of "robotic systems" were introduced, those which would later be principles of the Diet. He argued that agriculture wouldn't develop and land sales wouldn't grow if feudal restrictions were to remain in place, because landowners would be unable to get credit to their properties.

== The Reform Diets ==
1825–27

After many years of absence, a Diet was convened in Pozsony in 1825. The king Francis I, a conservative absolutist monarch, promised to return to the feudal constitution on the condition that the nobility increase the tax and rookie headcount. The Diet would now convene every 3 years.

István Széchenyi offered his annual income to establish a Hungarian Academy of Sciences.

1832–36

Hungary experienced a cholera outbreak in 1831, along with a serf uprising in Upper Hungary. The diet's lower house accepted the serfs voluntary redemption, but the monarch rejected that.

1839–40

Voluntary redemption was introduced, though the extreme poverty of Hungarian serfs meant there was little impact. Jewish emancipation was also put into effect, increasing Jewish immigration to Hungarian lands.

1843–44

Hungarian became the official language of Hungary. A protectionist tariff (the Védegylet) was established, meaning Hungarians would only purchase domestic goods for 6 years.

1847–48 (the last Estates General)

Lajos Kossuth became the emissary of Pest.

The April Laws were adopted in March 1848, sanctioned by the King on 11 April 1848. These introduced a constitutional monarchy, an accountable government, and expanded suffrage. Through this, civil liberties were declared and the old feudal system had been abolished.
