= Ferdinand I of Austria =

Emperor of Austria from 1835 to 1848

Ferdinand I & V
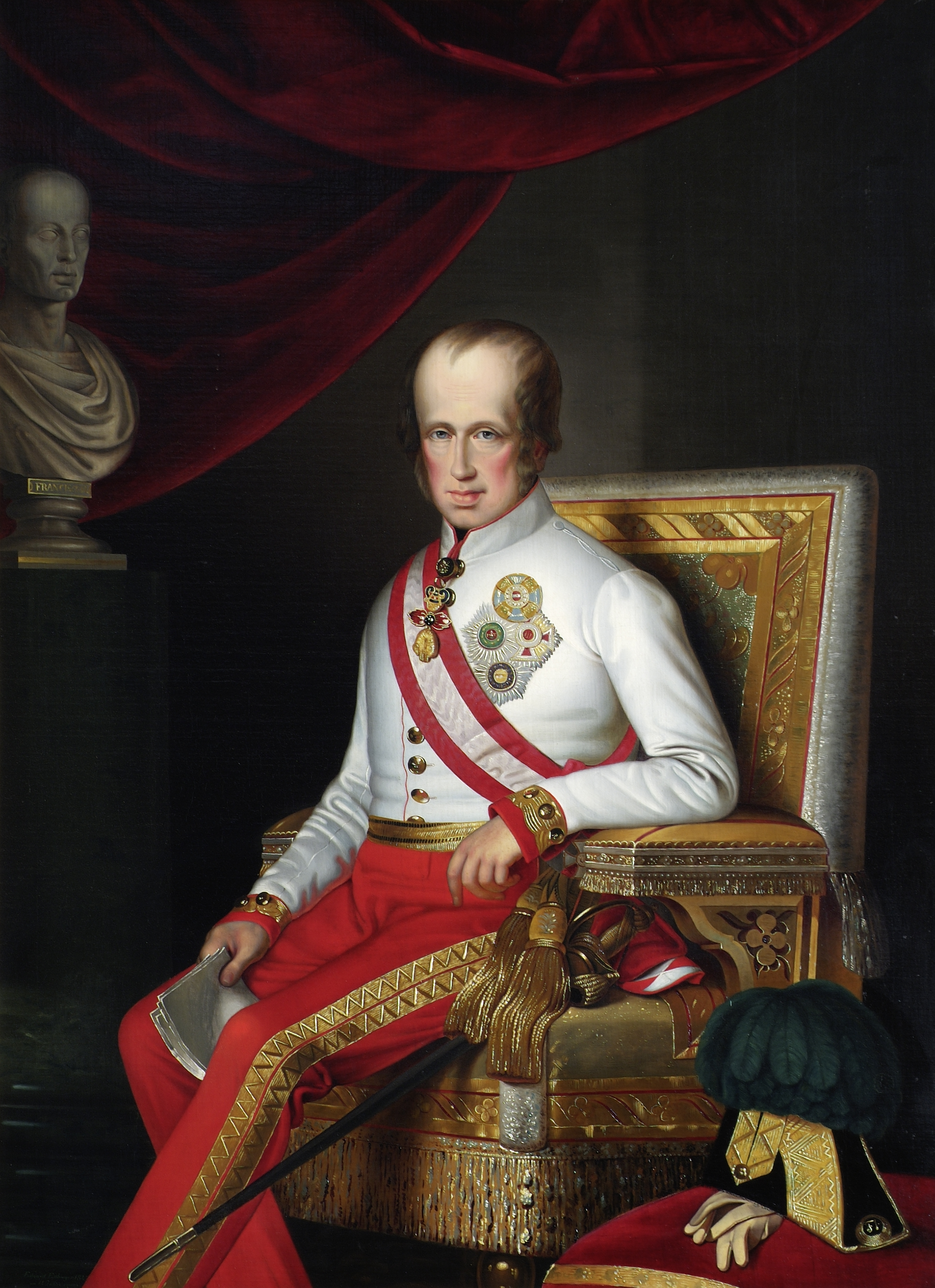
- Ferdinand I in the uniform of an Austrian field marshal, by Eduard Edlinger, c. 1843

Emperor of Austria King of Hungary
- Reign: 2 March 1835 – 2 December 1848
- Coronations: 28 September 1830, Pressburg (as junior king); 7 September 1836, Prague; 6 September 1838, Milan
- Predecessor: Francis I
- Successor: Franz Joseph I

Head of the Präsidialmacht Austria
- In office 2 March 1835 – 12 July 1848
- Preceded by: Francis I
- Succeeded by: Franz Joseph I
- Born: 19 April 1793; Vienna, Archduchy of Austria, Holy Roman Empire
- Died: 29 June 1875 (aged 82); Prague, Austria-Hungary
- Burial: Imperial Crypt
- Spouse: Maria Anna of Savoy (m. 1831)
Names
- German: Ferdinand Karl Leopold Joseph Franz Marcellin; English: Ferdinand Charles Leopold Joseph Francis Marcellin
- House: Habsburg-Lorraine
- Father: Francis II, Holy Roman Emperor
- Mother: Maria Theresa of Naples and Sicily
- Religion: Roman Catholicism

Ferdinand I and V (German: Ferdinand Karl Leopold Joseph Franz Marcellin; 19 April 1793 – 29 June 1875) was Emperor of Austria (as Ferdinand I), King of Hungary (as Ferdinand V), and the ruler of the other states of the Habsburg monarchy from March 1835 until his abdication in December 1848. From 2 March 1835 to 12 July 1848, he was also president of the German Confederation. Due to his passive but well-intentioned character, he gained the sobriquet The Benign (German: Der Gütige) or The Benevolent (Czech: Ferdinand Dobrotivý; Polish: Ferdynand Dobrotliwy).

Ferdinand succeeded his father Francis I upon his death on 2 March 1835. He was incapable of ruling the empire because of severe epilepsy, so his father, before he died, made a will promulgating that Ferdinand should consult his uncle Archduke Louis on all aspects of internal policy and urged him to be influenced by Prince Metternich, Austria's Foreign Minister.

Following the Revolutions of 1848, Ferdinand abdicated on 2 December 1848. He was succeeded by his nephew, Franz Joseph. Following his abdication, he lived in Hradčany Palace, Prague, until his death in 1875.

Ferdinand married Maria Anna of Savoy, the sixth child of Victor Emmanuel I of Sardinia. They had no children.

== Biography ==
=== Early life ===
Ferdinand was the eldest son of Francis II, Holy Roman Emperor, and Maria Theresa of Naples and Sicily. Possibly as a result of his parents' genetic closeness (they were double first cousins), Ferdinand had hydrocephalus, neurological problems including epilepsy, and a speech impediment. He was educated by Baron Josef Kalasanz von Erberg, and his wife Countess Josephine von Attems.

=== Reign ===
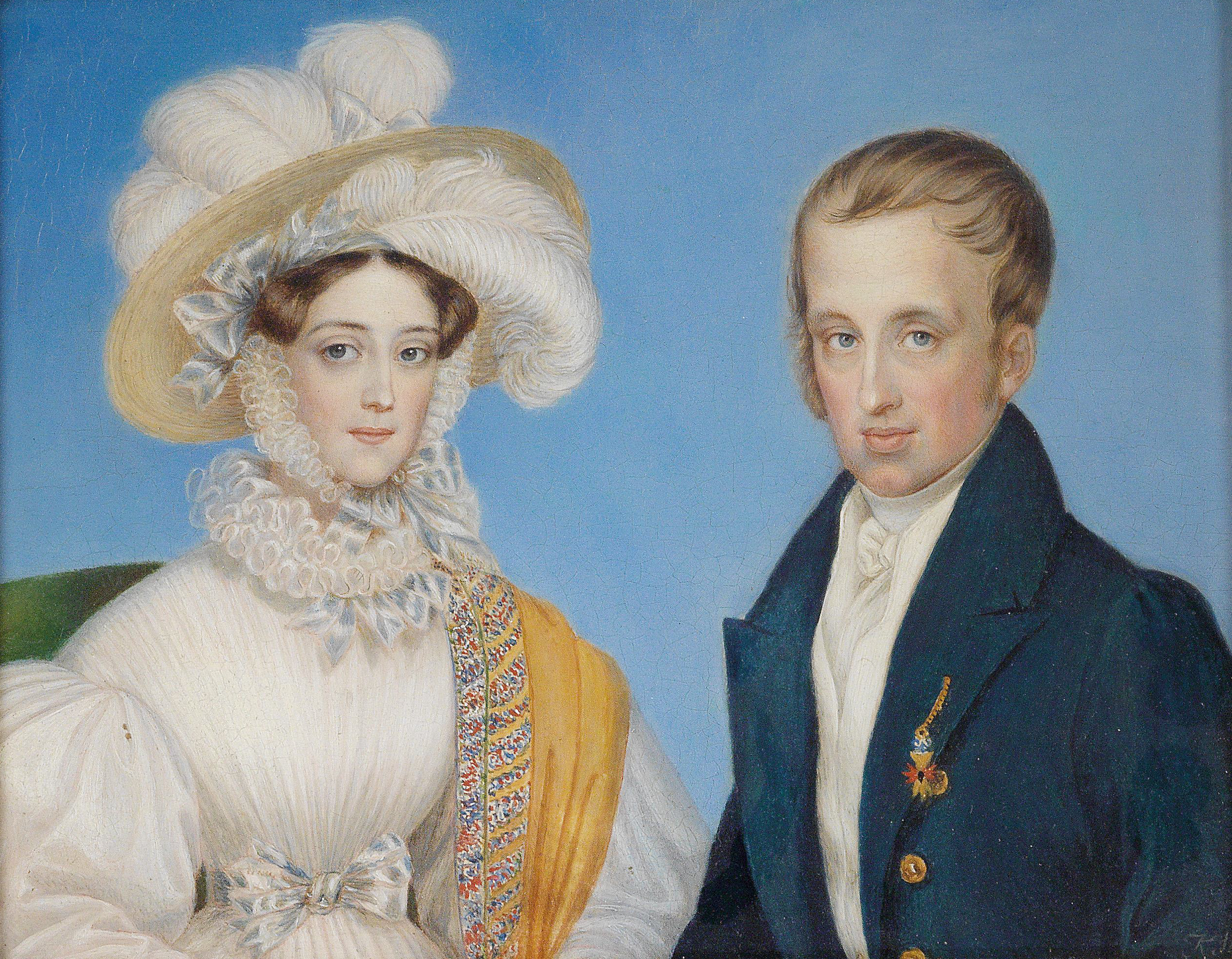
Double portrait of Ferdinand and Maria Anna of Savoy

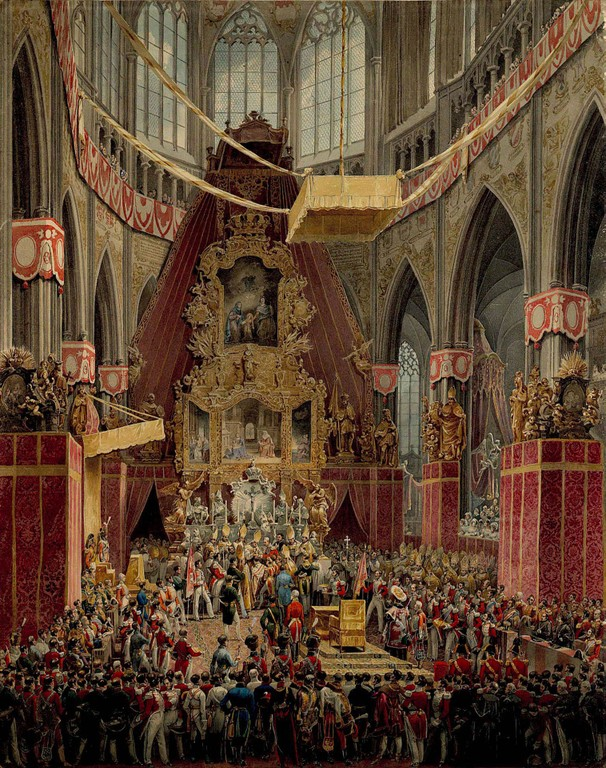
Coronation of King Ferdinand V in 1836 in Prague

Although Ferdinand has been depicted as feeble-minded and incapable of ruling, he kept a coherent and legible diary and has even been said to have had a sharp wit. However, suffering as many as twenty seizures per day severely restricted his ability to rule with any effectiveness. Though he was not declared incapacitated, a Regent's Council (Archduke Louis, Count Kolowrat, and Prince Metternich) steered the government.

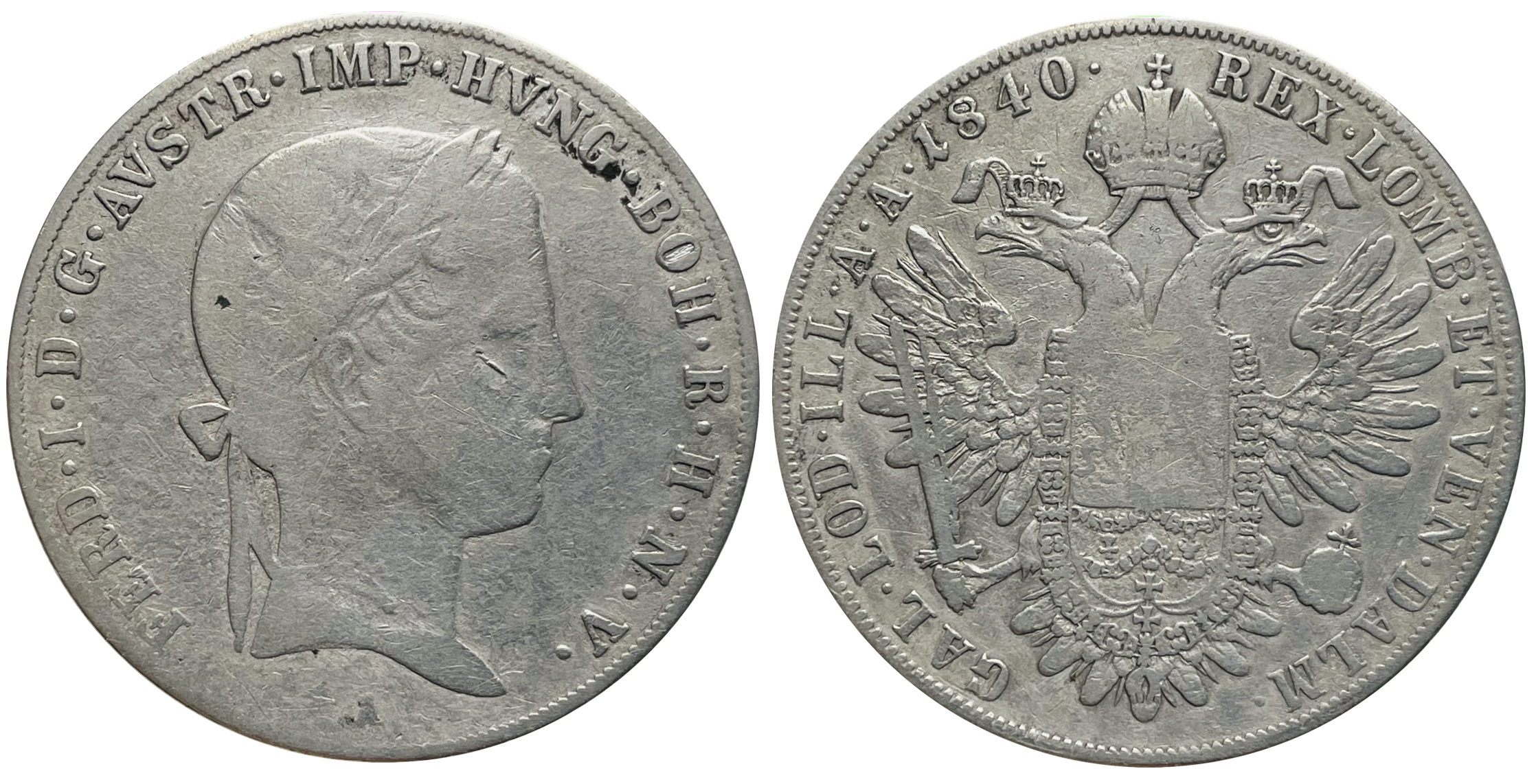
Thaler minted during the reign of Ferdinand I, c. 1840

When Ferdinand married Princess Maria Anna of Savoy, the court physician considered it unlikely that he would be able to consummate the marriage. When he tried to consummate the marriage, he had five seizures. He is also remembered for his command to his cook: when told he could not have apricot dumplings (Marillenknödel) because apricots were out of season, he said "I am the Emperor and I want dumplings!" (German: Ich bin der Kaiser und ich will Knödel!).

=== 1848 Revolution ===
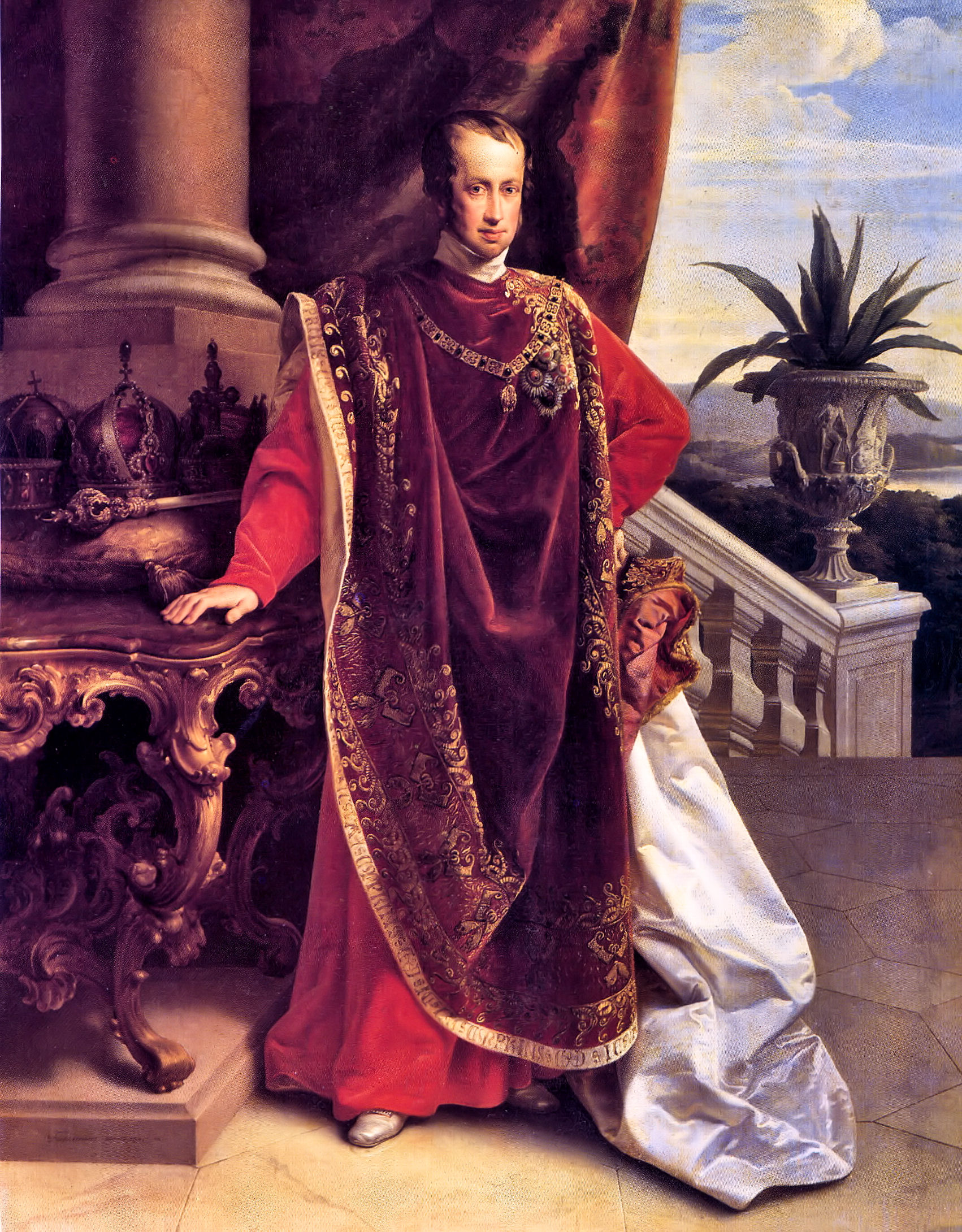
State portrait of Ferdinand I in the ceremonial robes of the Order of the Golden Fleece by Leopold Kupelwieser, 1847

As the revolutionaries of 1848 were marching on the palace, he is supposed to have asked Metternich for an explanation. When Metternich answered that they were starting a revolution, Ferdinand is supposed to have said "But are they allowed to do that?" (Viennese German: Ja, dürfen's denn des?). He was convinced by Prince Felix of Schwarzenberg to abdicate in favour of his nephew, Franz Joseph (the next in line was Ferdinand's younger brother Franz Karl, but he was persuaded by his wife Sophie to renounce his succession rights in favour of his son), who would occupy the Austrian throne for the next 68 years.

Ferdinand recorded the events in his diary:

The affair ended with the new Emperor kneeling before his old Emperor and Lord, that is to say, me, and asking for a blessing, which I gave him, laying both hands on his head and making the sign of the Holy Cross ... then I embraced him and kissed our new master, and then we went to our room. Afterwards I and my dear wife heard Holy Mass ... After that I and my dear wife packed our bags.

=== In retirement (1848–1875) ===
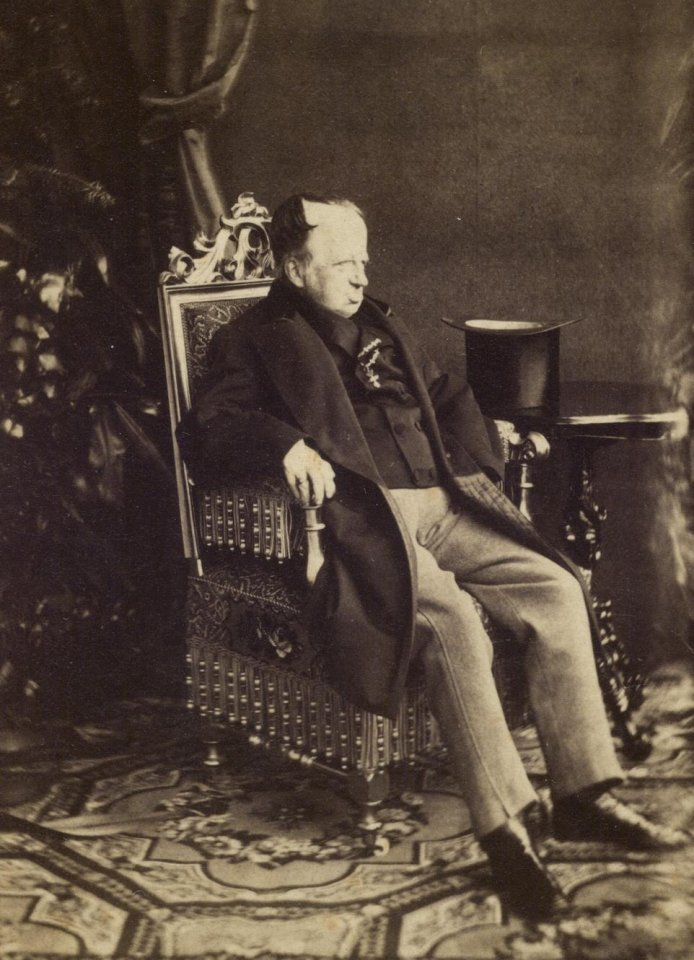
Photograph of the aged Ferdinand by the 1860s

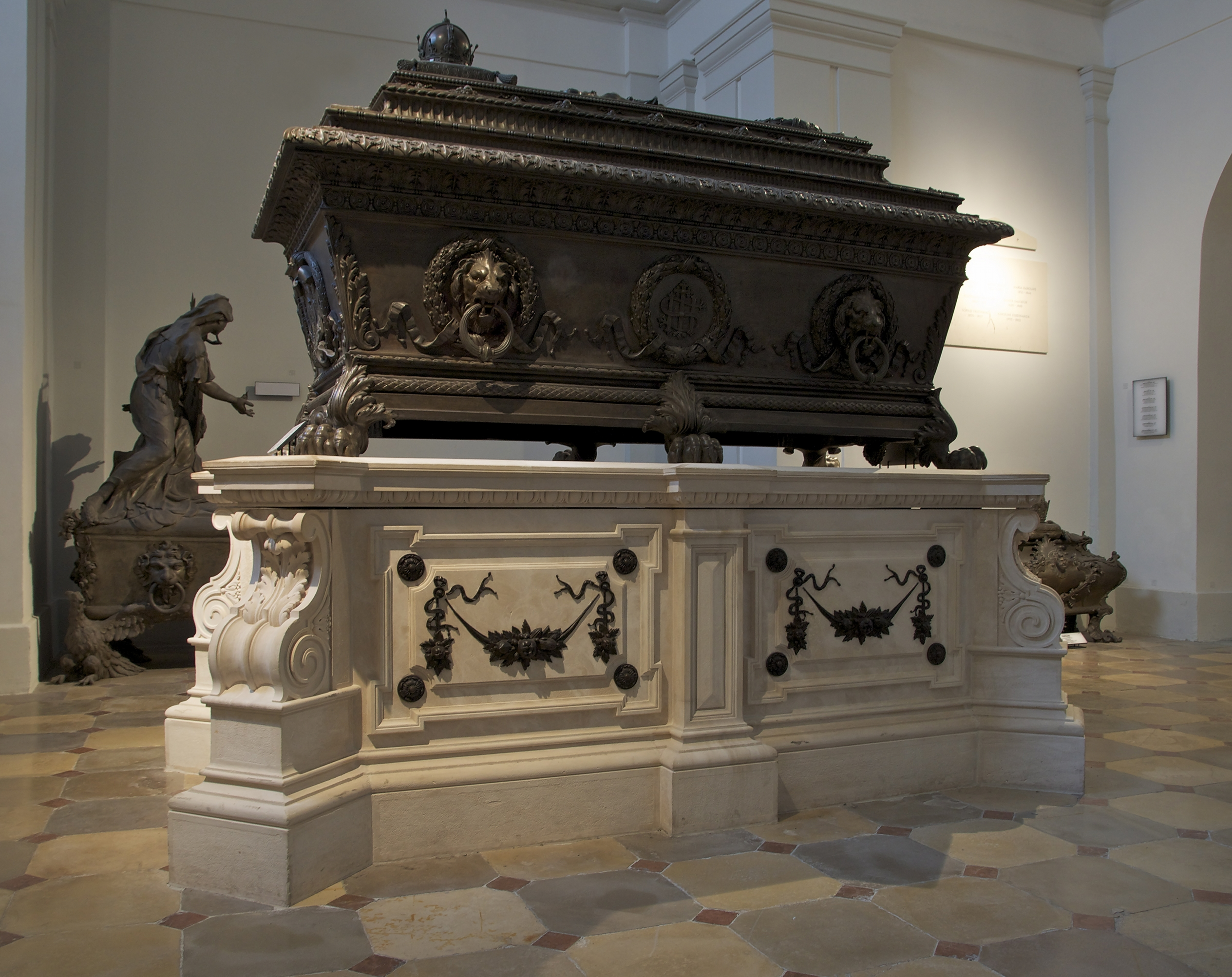
Ferdinand's sarcophagus in the Imperial Crypt, Vienna

Ferdinand was the last King of Bohemia to be crowned as such. Due to his sympathy with Bohemia (where he spent the rest of his life in Prague Castle) he was given the Czech nickname Ferdinand Dobrotivý ('Ferdinand the Benevolent'). In Austria, Ferdinand was similarly nicknamed Ferdinand der Gütige ('Ferdinand the Benign'), though this was sometimes altered into the mocking spoonerism Gütinand der Fertige ('Goodinand the Finished').

Ferdinand was also the last ruler to be crowned with the Iron Crown of Lombardy in his capacity as King of Lombardy-Venetia.

He is interred in tomb number 62 in the Imperial Crypt in Vienna.

== Honours ==
- Austrian Empire:
  - Knight of the Golden Fleece, 1793
  - Grand Cross of the Royal Hungarian Order of St. Stephen, 1830
  - Grand Cross of the Imperial Order of Leopold
  - Knight of the Iron Crown, 1st Class
- France:
  - French Empire: Grand Eagle of the Legion of Honour
  - Kingdom of France: Knight of the Holy Spirit, 1816
- Kingdom of Bavaria: Knight of St. Hubert, 1824
- Duchy of Parma: Senator Grand Cross of the Constantinian Order of St. George, with Collar, 1826
- Grand Duchy of Hesse: Grand Cross of the Ludwig Order, 11 April 1830
- Electorate of Hesse: Grand Cross of the Golden Lion, 26 December 1830
- Baden:
  - Grand Cross of the House Order of Fidelity, 1830
  - Grand Cross of the Zähringer Lion, 1830
- Kingdom of Saxony: Knight of the Rue Crown, 1830
- Two Sicilies:
  - Knight of St. Januarius, 1830
  - Grand Cross of St. Ferdinand and Merit
- Württemberg: Knight of the Golden Eagle, 1830
- Kingdom of Sardinia: Knight of the Annunciation, 12 January 1831
- Kingdom of Prussia: Knight of the Black Eagle, 24 January 1831
- Denmark: Knight of the Elephant, 1 February 1831
- Empire of Brazil: Grand Cross of the Southern Cross
- Kingdom of Portugal:
  - Grand Cross of the Royal Military Order of Our Lord Jesus Christ
  - Grand Cross of the Tower and Sword
- Russian Empire: Knight of St. Andrew, 28 February 1835
- Saxe-Weimar-Eisenach: Grand Cross of the White Falcon, 2 April 1835
- Sweden-Norway: Knight of the Seraphim, 14 April 1835
- (Saxe-Coburg and Gotha) (Duchy of Saxe-Altenburg) (Saxe-Meiningen) Ernestine duchies: Grand Cross of the Saxe-Ernestine House Order, May 1835
- Ascanian duchies: Grand Cross of Albert the Bear, 18 March 1837
- Kingdom of Hanover:
  - Knight of St. George, 1847
  - Grand Cross of the Royal Guelphic Order, 1847
- Spain: Grand Cross of the Order of Charles III, 23 April 1849
- Grand Duchy of Tuscany: Grand Cross of St. Joseph

== Ancestry ==
Ancestors of Ferdinand I of Austria

8. Francis I, Holy Roman Emperor (= 14)
4. Leopold II, Holy Roman Emperor
9. Maria Theresa, Queen of Bohemia and Hungary (= 15)
2. Francis II, Holy Roman Emperor
10. Charles III, King of Spain (= 12)
5. Maria Luisa of Spain
11. Maria Amalia of Saxony (= 13)
1. Ferdinand I of Austria
12. Charles III, King of Spain (= 10)
6. Ferdinand I, King of the Two Sicilies
13. Maria Amalia of Saxony (= 11)
3. Maria Theresa of Naples and Sicily
14. Francis I, Holy Roman Emperor (= 8)
7. Maria Carolina of Austria
15. Maria Theresa, Queen of Bohemia and Hungary (= 9)

Ancestry of Ferdinand I of Austria

Ferdinand's parents were double first cousins as they shared all four grandparents (Francis' paternal grandparents were his wife's maternal grandparents and vice versa). Therefore, Ferdinand only had four great-grandparents, being descended from each of them twice. Further back in his ancestry there is more pedigree collapse due to the close intermarriage between the Houses of Austria and Spain and other Catholic monarchies.

== See also ==
- Charles II of Spain (1661–1700)
- List of heirs to the Austrian throne
- Rulers of Germany family tree. He was related to every other ruler of Germany.

Ferdinand I of Austria House of Habsburg-Lorraine Cadet branch of the House of Lorraine Born: 19 April 1793 Died: 29 June 1875
Regnal titles
Preceded by Francis I	Emperor of Austria; King of Dalmatia; King of Galicia and Lodomeria; King of Illyria; King of Lombardy-Venetia; King of Hungary; King of Croatia; King of Slavonia; King of Bohemia; 1835–1848	Succeeded by Francis Joseph I
Political offices
Preceded by Francis I of Austria	Head of the Präsidialmacht Austria; 1835–1848	Succeeded by Franz Joseph I of Austria
