= Contingent election =

Election of the U.S. president and vice president by Congress

In the United States, a contingent election is used to elect the president or vice president if no candidate receives a majority in the Electoral College. A presidential contingent election is decided by a special vote of the United States House of Representatives, while a vice-presidential contingent election is decided by a vote of the United States Senate. During a contingent election in the House, each state delegation votes en bloc to choose the president instead of representatives voting individually. Senators, by contrast, cast votes individually for vice president.

The contingent election process is specified in Article Two, Section 1, Clause 3 of the United States Constitution. The procedure was modified by the Twelfth Amendment in 1804, under which the House chooses one of the three candidates who received the most electoral votes, while the Senate chooses one of the two candidates who received the most electoral votes. The phrase "contingent election" is not in the text of the Constitution but has been used to describe this procedure since at least 1823.

Contingent elections have occurred three times in American history: in 1801, 1825, and 1837. In 1800, Thomas Jefferson and Aaron Burr, the presidential and vice-presidential nominees on the ticket of the Democratic-Republican Party, received the same number of electoral votes. Under the pre-Twelfth Amendment Constitution, a contingent election was held the following year to decide which one would be president and which vice president. In 1824, the Electoral College was split among four presidential candidates, with Andrew Jackson losing the subsequent contingent election in the House to John Quincy Adams even though he won a plurality of both the popular and electoral votes. In 1836, faithless electors in Virginia refused to vote for Martin Van Buren's vice presidential nominee, Richard Mentor Johnson, denying him a majority of the electoral vote and thus forcing a contingent election in the Senate for vice president; Johnson won the election handily.

The past three contingent elections were conducted by the outgoing Congress because congressional terms then ended / began on March 4, the same day as presidential terms. In 1933, the Twentieth Amendment set the new congressional term to start on January 3 and the new presidential term on January 20. The amendment shortened the length of lame-duck sessions of Congress by two months, and any future contingent elections would be conducted by the incoming Congress.

== Electoral College overview ==
In the United States, the president and vice president are indirectly elected by the Electoral College, which, since ratification of the Twenty-third Amendment in 1961, consists of presidential electors from the 50 states and the District of Columbia. The 538 electors that make up the Electoral College are directly elected by their respective states. Since the election of 1824, most states have chosen their electors on a statewide winner-take-all basis, based on the statewide popular vote on Election Day. Maine and Nebraska are the two exceptions, with both states allocating electors by congressional district. Although ballots list the names of the presidential and vice presidential candidates (who run together as a ticket), voters actually choose electors when they vote for president and vice president. The presidential electors in turn cast electoral votes for the two offices. Electors normally pledge to vote for their party's nominee, but some "faithless electors" have voted for other candidates.

A candidate must receive an absolute majority of electoral votes (270 since 1964) to win the presidency or the vice presidency. If no candidate receives a majority in the election for president or vice president, that election is determined via the contingency procedure in the 12th Amendment. In this case, the House chooses the president from among the top three presidential electoral vote-getters, and the Senate chooses the vice president from among the top two vice presidential electoral vote-getters.

Section 3 of the Twentieth Amendment specifies that if the House of Representatives has not chosen a president-elect in time for the inauguration (noon on January 20), then the vice president-elect becomes acting president until the House selects a president. Under the Presidential Succession Act of 1947, the Speaker of the House will become acting president until either the House selects a president or the Senate selects a vice president. As of 2026, none of these circumstances have ever occurred. The Constitutional silence on this point could have caused a constitutional crisis in the 1801 contingent election, when the House of Representatives was temporarily unable to resolve the Jefferson–Burr Electoral College deadlock.

== Procedures ==
=== Presidential election ===
If no candidate for president receives an absolute majority of the electoral votes, pursuant to the Twelfth Amendment, the House of Representatives must go into session immediately to choose a president from among the three candidates who received the most electoral votes. Each state delegation votes en bloc, with each having a single vote. A candidate must receive an absolute majority of state delegation votes (currently 26 votes) to become president-elect. The House continues balloting until it elects a president. As a consequence of the en bloc voting, the party that holds the majority in the House could lose the contingent election if the minority party holds the majority of state delegations. The District of Columbia, which is not a state, does not participate; the Twenty-third Amendment, which granted electoral votes to the district, does not grant the District of Columbia a vote in contingent elections.

Historically, a delegation that did not award a majority of its votes to any one candidate was marked as "divided" and thus did not award its vote to any candidate. This practice, set by House rule, was responsible for turning the Jefferson–Burr election of 1801 into a multiple ballot election. This rule was also followed in 1825 but was not a factor in the outcome. The contingent presidential elections to date have been held in closed session, with the vote of each representative not revealed outside the House Journal. The Constitution does not require a contingent election to be held in a closed session, so a future contingent election could be held in an open session with public voting.

=== Vice-presidential election ===
If no candidate for vice president receives a majority of the electoral votes, pursuant to the Twelfth Amendment, the Senate is required to go into session immediately to choose the vice president from the two candidates receiving the most electoral votes. Unlike in the House, senators cast votes individually. In a contingent election, the Senate votes separately from the House, so the president chosen by the House and the vice president chosen by the Senate could be from different parties.

The Twelfth Amendment requires a "majority of the whole number" of senators (currently 51 out of 100) to elect the vice president in a contingent election. In practical terms, this means that an absence or an abstention from voting is tantamount to a negative vote and could impair the election of either candidate. Some academics and journalists have thought that the language in the Constitution about being elected by a "majority of the whole number of senators" makes it unlikely that the vice president could break a tie.

== Past contingent elections ==
=== 1800 presidential election ===
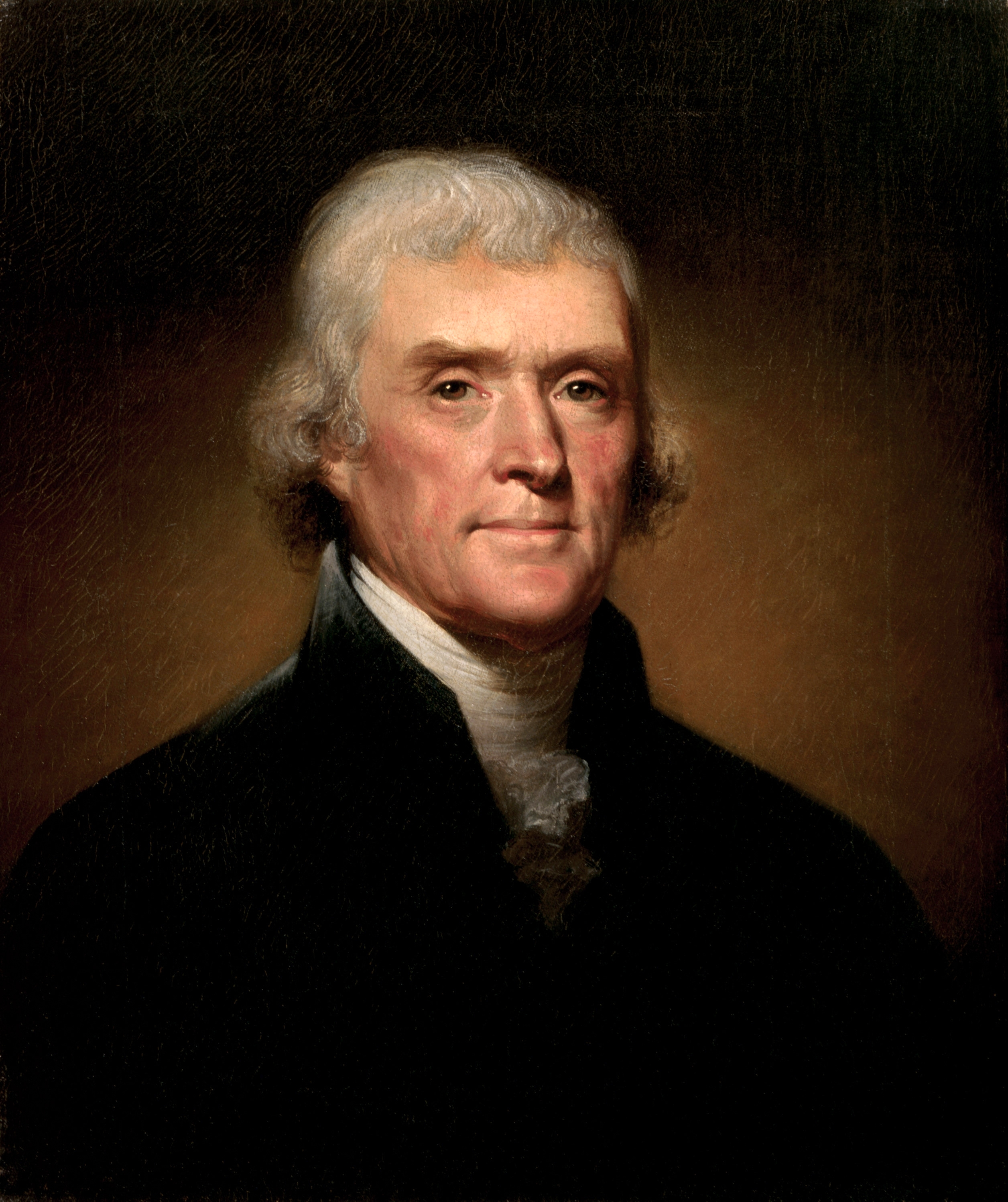
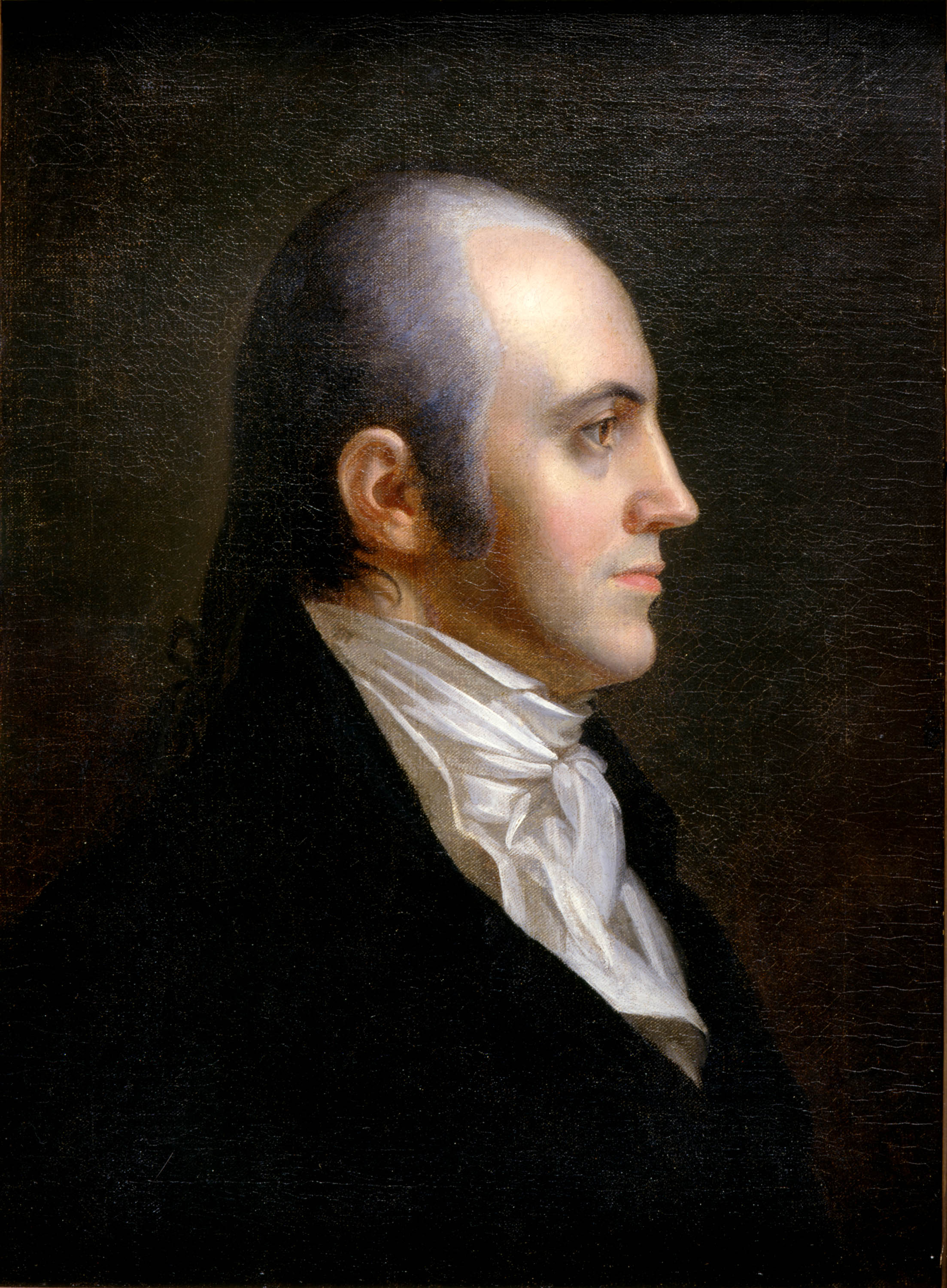
The Democratic-Republican Party intended for Thomas Jefferson (left) to be elected president and Aaron Burr (right) to be vice president, but they tied in the Electoral College and many Federalists in the House of Representatives voted for Burr in the contingent election due to their opposition to Jefferson.

The 1800 presidential election pitted the Democratic-Republican ticket, Thomas Jefferson and Aaron Burr, against the Federalist Party ticket, John Adams and Charles Cotesworth Pinckney. Under the original process in the Constitution, each elector cast two votes with no distinction between those for president and those for vice president. The person receiving a majority of votes was elected president, and the person receiving the second highest number of votes was elected vice president. Each party planned to have one of their respective electors vote for a third candidate or abstain, so that their preferred presidential candidate (Adams for the Federalists and Jefferson for the Democratic-Republicans) would win one more vote than their other nominee. The Democratic-Republicans failed to execute their plan, however, resulting in a tie between Jefferson and Burr with 73 electoral votes each and a third-place finish for Adams with 65 votes.

The Constitution mandates that, "if there be more than one who have such Majority, and have an equal Number of Votes, then the House of Representatives shall immediately chuse [sic] by Ballot one of them for President." Therefore, Jefferson and Burr were admitted as candidates in the House election. Although the congressional election of 1800 turned majority control of the House of Representatives over to the Democratic-Republicans, the presidential election was decided by the outgoing House, which had a Federalist majority. Nonetheless, in contingent elections, the votes for the president are taken by states, with each delegation from each state having one vote; as a result, neither party had a majority in 1801, because some states had split delegations. Given the deadlock, Democratic-Republican representatives, who generally favored Jefferson for president, contemplated two distasteful possible outcomes: either the Federalists manage to engineer a victory for Burr, or they refuse to break the deadlock; the second scenario would leave a Federalist, Secretary of State John Marshall, as acting president come Inauguration Day.

Over the course of seven days, from February 11 to 17, the House cast 35 successive ballots, with Jefferson receiving the votes of eight state delegations each time, one short of the necessary majority. On February 17, on the 36th ballot, Jefferson was elected after several Federalist representatives cast blank ballots, resulting in Maryland and Vermont's votes changing from no selection to Jefferson, thus giving him the votes of 10 states and the presidency. This situation was the impetus for the passage of the Twelfth Amendment, which provides for separate elections for president and vice president in the Electoral College.

=== 1824 presidential election ===
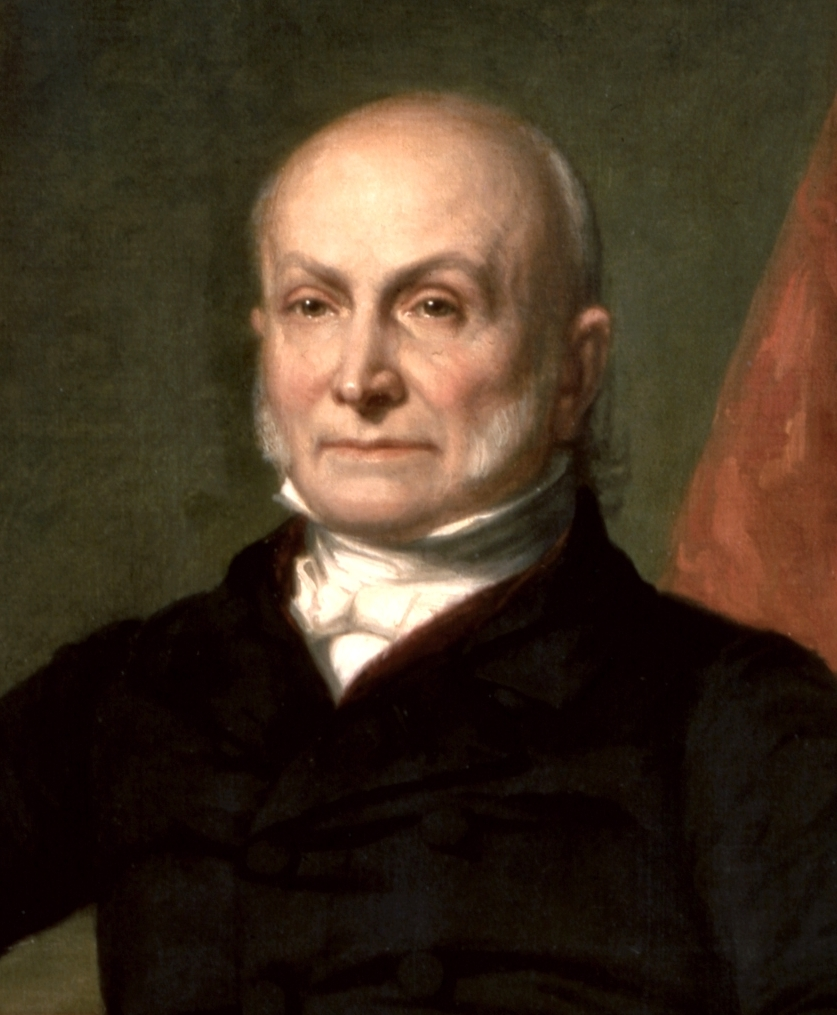
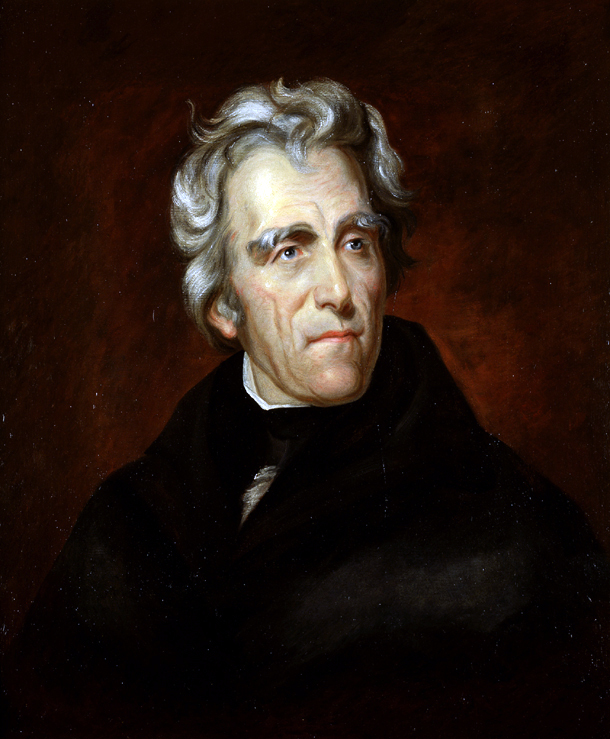
Four candidates received votes in the Electoral College in 1824, with no candidate attaining a majority. The House of Representative elected John Quincy Adams (left) even though Andrew Jackson (right) had won a plurality of both the electoral and popular votes in the original election.

The 1824 presidential election came at the end of the Era of Good Feelings in American politics and had four Democratic-Republican candidates who won electoral votes: Andrew Jackson, John Quincy Adams, William H. Crawford, and Henry Clay. While Andrew Jackson received more electoral and popular votes than any other candidate, he did not receive the majority of 131 electoral votes required to win the election, leading to a contingent election in the House of Representatives. Vice presidential candidate John C. Calhoun easily defeated his rivals, as the support of both the Adams and Jackson camps gave him an unassailable lead over the other candidates.

Following the provisions of the Twelfth Amendment, only the top three candidates in the electoral vote (Jackson, Adams, and Crawford) were admitted as candidates in the House: Clay, the Speaker of the House at the time, was eliminated. Clay subsequently threw his support to Adams, who was elected president on February 9, 1825, on the first ballot with 13 states, followed by Jackson with seven, and Crawford with four. Adams' victory shocked Jackson, who, as the winner of a plurality of both the popular and electoral votes, expected to be elected president. By appointing Clay his Secretary of State, President Adams essentially declared him heir to the presidency, as Adams and his three predecessors had all served as Secretary of State. Jackson and his followers accused Adams and Clay of striking a "corrupt bargain", on which the Jacksonians would campaign for the next four years, ultimately attaining Jackson's victory in the Adams–Jackson rematch in the 1828 election.

=== 1837 vice presidential election ===
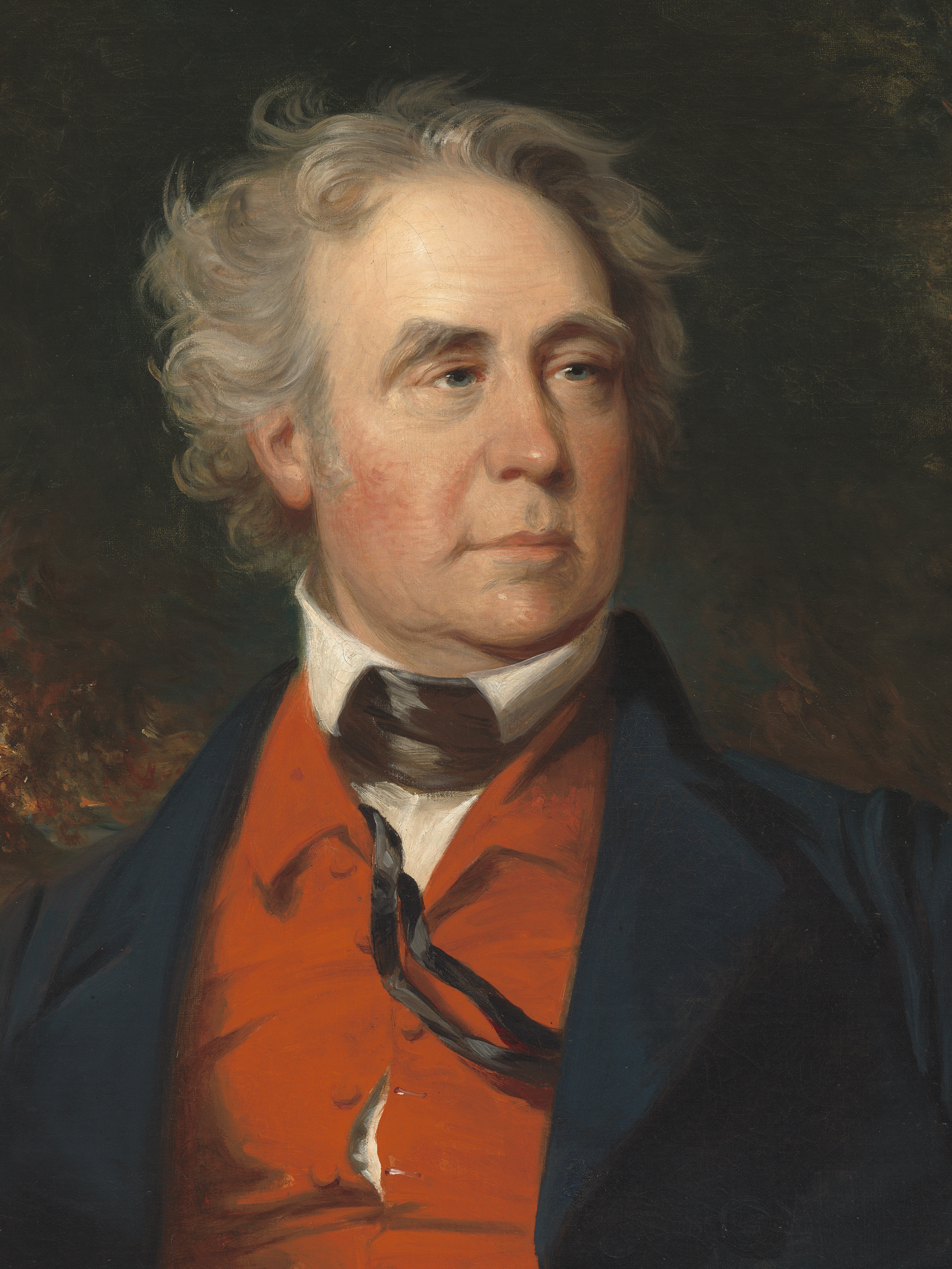
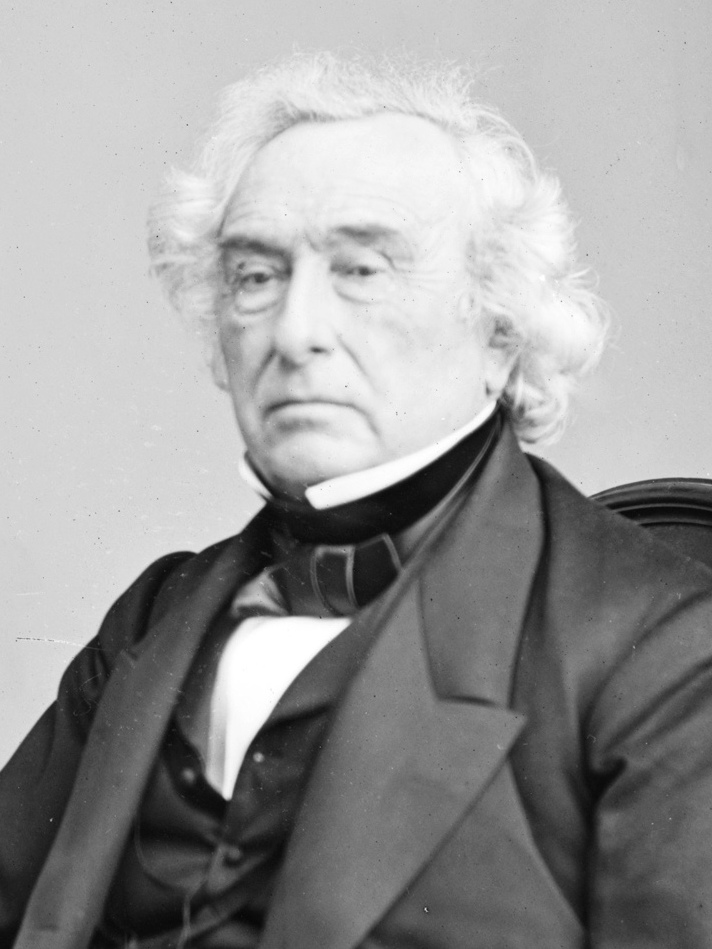
While Democratic presidential candidate Martin Van Buren won a majority of the Electoral College, Virginia's electors refused to vote for his running mate Richard Mentor Johnson (left), forcing a contingent election in the Senate against Whig candidate Francis Granger (right).

In the 1836 presidential election, Democratic presidential candidate Martin Van Buren and his running mate Richard Mentor Johnson won the popular vote in enough states to receive a majority of the Electoral College. However, Virginia's 23 electors all became faithless electors and refused to vote for Johnson, leaving him one vote shy of the 148-vote majority required to elect him. Under the Twelfth Amendment, a contingent election in the Senate had to decide between Johnson and Whig candidate Francis Granger. Johnson was elected easily in a single ballot by 33 to 16.

== Proposed alterations ==
Some members of Congress have proposed constitutional amendments to alter the contingent election process. Some proposals call for the abolition of the Electoral College and the contingent election process in favor of the direct election of the president, with the candidate who receives a plurality or majority of the popular vote becoming president. Other proposals have sought to alter the contingent election process for president so that each member of the House, rather than each state delegation, holds one vote, or to have both contingent elections by a joint session of Congress.

== Outside the United States ==
Contingent elections for president were historically also present in the constitutions of various Latin American countries which were influenced by the U.S. Constitution. For example, under the Chilean Constitution of 1925, if no candidate won an absolute majority in the presidential election, both houses of the National Congress would come together to select one of the top two candidates as President.
