= Turopolje =

Geographical subregion in Croatia proper

Coordinates: 45°39′N 16°09′E

- Geographic region^{a}
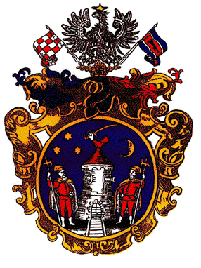
- Coat of arms
- Etymology: Croatian: turopolje, lit. 'aurochs field'
- Interactive map of Turopolje
- Country: Croatia
- Traditional capital: Velika Gorica
- ^{a} Turopolje is not designated as an official region, it is a geographic region only.

Turopolje (Croatian pronunciation: [tûropoʎe]), historically also known as Turovo polje, is a region in Croatia between the capital city Zagreb and Sisak. The administrative center of the Turopolje region is the town of Velika Gorica.

== Geography ==
Turopolje forms part of Posavina, a region south of Zagreb bordering the right banks of the Sava River on the east, and the Vukomericke Gorice hills to the southwest. It extends across an alluvial plain 45 km in length and up to 23 km in width. The area of the region occupies an area of about 600 km^{2}, with an average elevation of 110 m above sea level. Turopolje is divided into two halves by the river Odra and its tributary Lomnica.

== Etymology ==
The name Turopolje comes from the combination of the Croatian and Old Slavic words Tur meaning 'aurochs' (Bos primigenius), a wild bovine species present in the area during the Middle Ages, and polje meaning 'field'. Turopolje can therefore be rendered in English as "Aurochs Field".

== History ==
Velika Gorica is the largest settlement and is first mentioned as Gorica in 1228. Other settlements include Mraclin (since prehistoric times), Staro Čiče (Bronze Age), Šćitarjevo (Roman empire), Lukavec (defense castle dating to the 15th century), Lekenik, Vukojevac, Peščenica, Buševec, Ogulinec, Vukovina, Poljana Lekenička and Brežana Lekenička.

The village of Vukojevac is currently in the middle of an environmental battle in order to reroute the proposed highway between Zagreb and Sisak.

== Culture ==
There is a pig breed from the region named the Turopolje pig.

== Sources ==
- Turopolje at enciklopedija.hr (in Croatian)
