= Majláth =

Majláth or Mailáth is a Hungarian-language surname. It may relate to two Hungarian noble families: mainly the Majláth family, and sometimes the Maylád family. Notable people with the surname include:

- Andreas Mailath-Pokorny (born 1959), Austrian university rector, diplomat, and politician
- Charlotte von Majláth, Austrian court official
- György Mailáth (1786–1861), Hungarian statesman
- György Mailáth (1818–1883), Hungarian politician
- György Mailáth (1854–1924), Hungarian politician
- János Majláth, Hungarian writer and historian
- Júlia Majláth (1921–1976), Hungarian composer
- Majláth István, one Hungarian spelling variant of the name of Ștefan Mailat (1502-1550), Voivode of Transylvania (1534-1541), member of the Maylád family
- Margit Majláth, Hungarian noblewoman

== See also ==
- Mailat
- Mailáth (disambiguation)
- de:Mailath
