= Samassa =

Samassa is a surname. Notable people with the surname include:

- Adolf Samassa (1867–1929), Hungarian politician
- József Samassa (1828–1912), Hungarian cardinal
- Mamadou Samassa, multiple people
