= György Mailáth =

György Mailáth may refer to:

- György Mailáth (1786–1861), Hungarian statesman
- György Mailáth (1818–1883), Hungarian politician
- György Mailáth (1854–1924), Hungarian politician
