= Perín-Chym =

Perín-Chym Perín-Chym
- Municipality
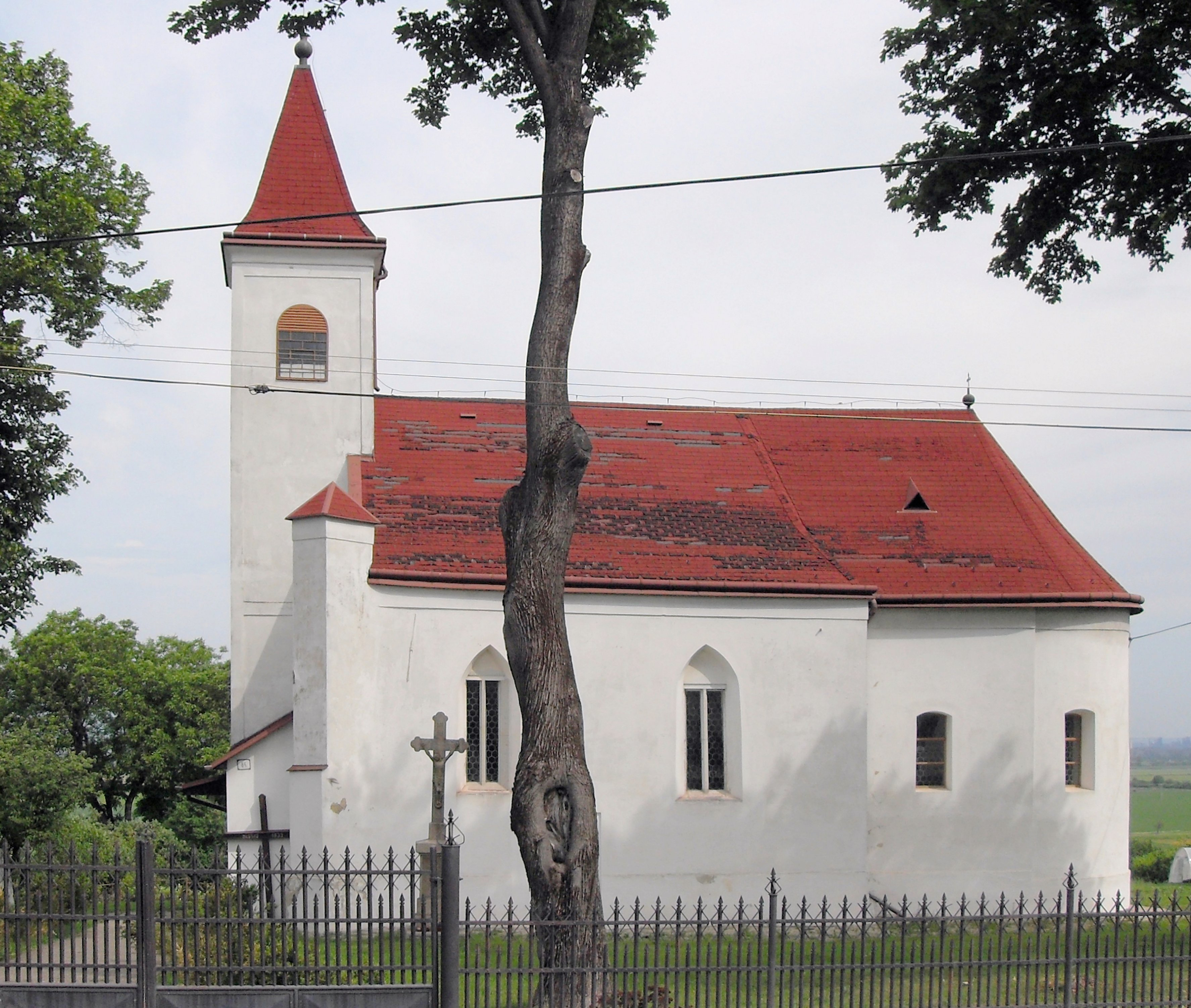
- The Roman Catholic Church of Saint Stephen in Perín-Chym.

- Flag

- Location of Perín-Chym in the Košice Region Location of Perín-Chym in Slovakia
- Coordinates: 48.53°N 21.19°E
- Country: Slovakia
- Region: Košice Region
- District: Košice-okolie District
- First mentioned: 1964

Government
  - Mayor: Ronald Vinter (KDH, HLAS-SD)

Area
  - Total: 41.51 km^{2} (16.03 sq mi)
- Elevation: 214 m (702 ft)

Population (2025)
  - Total: 1,600
- Time zone: UTC+1 (CET)
  - Summer (DST): UTC+2 (CEST)
- Postal code: 447 4
- Area code: +421 55
- Vehicle registration plate (until 2022): KS
- Website: www.perin-chym.sk

Perín-Chym is a municipality (village) in eastern Slovakia near the town of Košice.

It arose in 1964 by a merger of the municipalities Perín (first written mention 1220; before 1927 called Perina) and Chym (first written mention 1294; also called Him in some periods in the past). The municipality Vyšný Lanec was merged with Perín-Chym in 1991.

The village Perín gave name to the Lords of Perín (Perényi), a noble family in the Kingdom of Hungary, whose oldest known member Urban was granted the domain of Perín in 1292.

Today the municipality is well-known thanks to ponds and fishery.

== Geography ==
The municipality lies at an altitude of 214 metres (702 ft) and covers an area of 41.51 km^{2} (16.03 sq mi) (2025).

== Population ==
Population statistic (10 years)
Year	1995	2005	2015	2025
Count	1523	1485	1423	1600
Difference		−2.49%	−4.17%	+12.43%

Population statistic
Year	2024	2025
Count	1576	1600
Difference		+1.52%

It has a population of 1600 people (31 December 2025).

=== Ethnicity ===
Census 2021 (1+ %)
Ethnicity	Number	Fraction
Slovak	1143	74.6%
Hungarian	405	26.43%
Not found out	79	5.15%
Total	1532	

In year 2021 was 1532 people by ethnicity 1143 as Slovak, 405 as Hungarian, 79 as Not found out, 7 as Czech, 6 as Ukrainian, 3 as Rusyn, 3 as English, 1 as Jewish, 1 as Irish, 1 as Romani, 1 as German, 1 as Moravian, 1 as Other and 1 as Albanian.

Note on population: The difference values of population numbers in the table "Population statistic" and in the sections "Ethnicity" & "Religion" is caused by the use of various statistical methods.

=== Religion ===
Census 2021 (1+ %)
Religion	Number	Fraction
Roman Catholic Church	1027	67.04%
None	187	12.21%
Calvinist Church	127	8.29%
Not found out	77	5.03%
Greek Catholic Church	69	4.5%
Total	1532	

In year 2021 was 1532 people by religion 1027 from Roman Catholic Church, 187 from None, 127 from Calvinist Church, 77 from Not found out, 69 from Greek Catholic Church, 15 from Evangelical Church, 14 from Jehovah's Witnesses, 5 from Eastern Orthodox Church, 4 from Ad hoc movements, 2 from Paganism and natural spirituality, 2 from Other, 1 from Other and not ascertained christian church, 1 from Christian Congregations in Slovakia and 1 from Baptists Church.
