= Károly Jeromos Pálffy =

Hungarian nobleman and politician (1735-1816)

Prince Károly József Jeromos Pálffy ab Erdöd
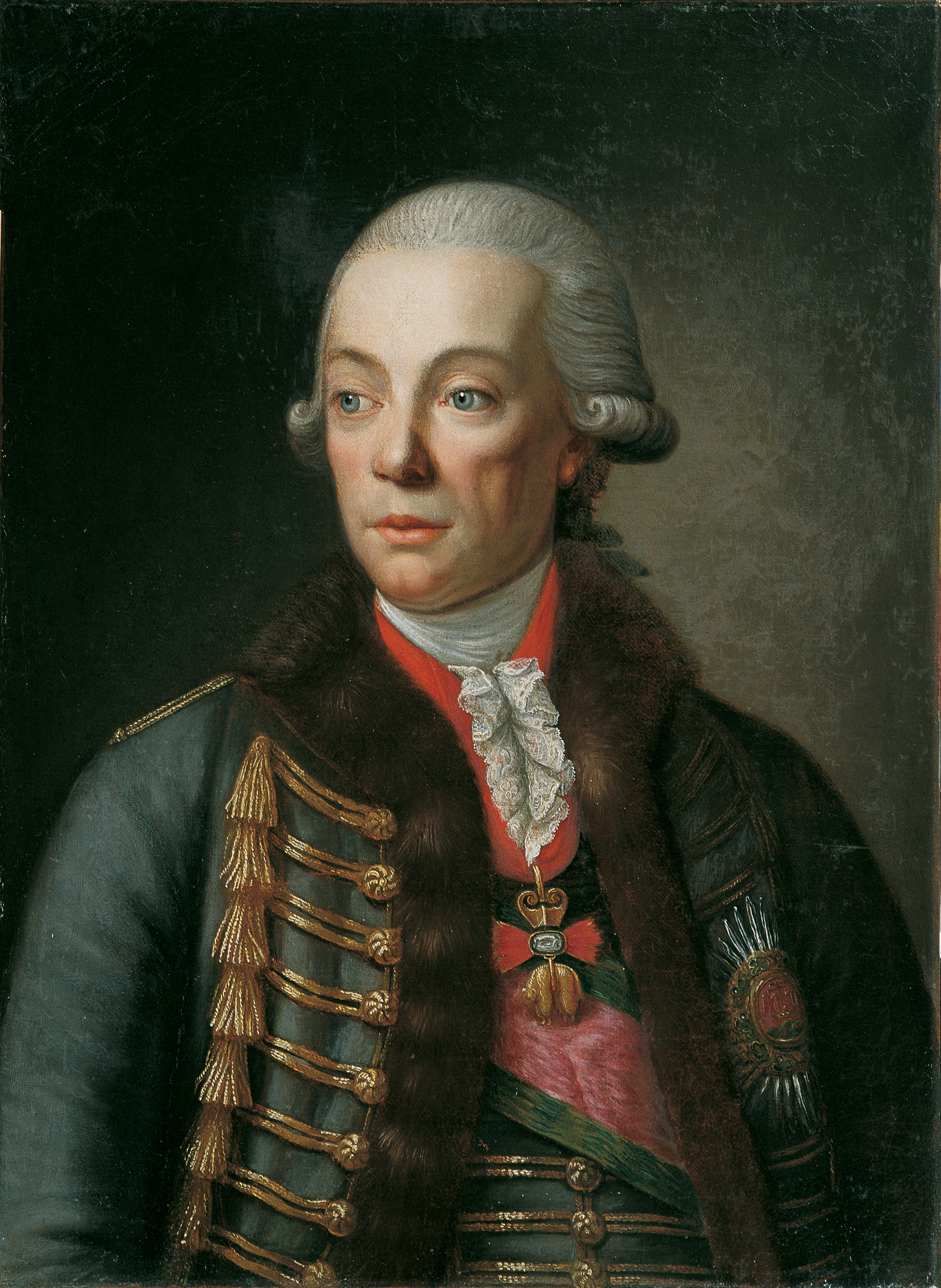
- Portrait of Pálffy, by Joseph Dorffmeister, c. 1782

Chancellor of the Hungarian Court Chancellery
- In office 1787–1807
- Preceded by: Ferenc Esterházy
- Succeeded by: József Erdődy

Personal details
- Born: 1 October 1735 Vienna, Archduchy of Austria
- Died: 25 May 1816 (aged 80) Vienna, Austrian Empire
- Spouse: Princess Maria Theresia Anna of Liechtenstein (after 1763)
- Children: József Franz Pálffy ab Erdöd; Nikolaus József Pálffy ab Erdöd
- Parent(s): Miklós VII Palffy ab Erdöd; Mária Anna Sidonia von Althann

Prince Károly József Jeromos Pálffy ab Erdöd (1 October 1735 – 25 May 1816) was a Hungarian nobleman and politician.

== Early life ==
Pálffy was born in Vienna on 1 October 1735. He was the son of Count Miklós VII Palffy ab Erdöd, a magistrate and Court Chancellor, and Countess Mária Anna Sidonia von Althann. Among his siblings was Countess Mária Anna Jozefa Franciska de Paula Pálffy ab Erdõd, who married Count János Baptist Esterhazy de Galántha (youngest son of Count Miklós Esterházy).

His paternal great-grandfather was Count Miklós Pálffy.

== Career ==
Pálffy began his career in the state office at the Lower Austrian provincial court. In 1757 he became an Imperial and Royal Chamberlain, in which position he served effectively for 13 years in the entourage of Emperor Joseph II.

On 5 December 1762 he was appointed as an Imperial and Royal Court Councillor to the Imperial and Royal Court Chamber and to the Court delegation of the bank. On 17 May 1774 he became Vice-President of the Court Chamber and on 18 July of that year, he was appointed a Real Inner Privy Councillor. On 2 December 1777, as he wished, because he wanted to serve his country, he was appointed vice president of the Hungarian Court Chamber.

In 1778, after the outbreak of the War of the Bavarian Succession, the Hungarian Queen Maria Theresa sent him to the Army to Joseph II. On 9 March 1779, he became the Lord Governor of Zemplén County; in 1780, the king sent him as a royal commissioner to the inauguration ceremony of the University in Buda. On 14 November 1782, he received the Order of the Golden Fleece and on 4 August 1783, he received the dignity of magister curiæ regiæ. On 4 March 1787, Emperor Joseph II appointed him as the Court Chancellor of Hungary and Transylvania and made him Chancellor of the Order with the Grand Cross of the Hungarian Order of Saint Stephen. On 14 May 1791, as the eldest member of the family, he became the hereditary Lord Governor of Pozsony County and Captain of its castle.

When he retired in 1807 due to his advanced age, he was elevated to the rank of Prince for his loyal services. He was a Freemason and the Grand Master of the Hungarian lodges.

== Personal life ==
In Vienna in 1763, he married Princess Maria Theresia Anna of Liechtenstein (1741–1766), the daughter of Prince Emanuel of Liechtenstein and Countess Maria Anna Antonia von Dietrichstein-Weichselstädt. Among her siblings were Franz Joseph I, Prince of Liechtenstein, who became the reigning monarch of Liechtenstein, as well as Prince Karl Borromäus of Liechtenstein (who married Princess Maria Eleonore of Oettingen-Spielberg). Together, they were the parents of:

- József Franz Pálffy ab Erdöd, who inherited the majorate from his maternal grandfather.
- Nikolaus József Pálffy ab Erdöd

Pálffy died in Vienna on 25 May 1816.
