= Pál Sennyey =

Hungarian politician

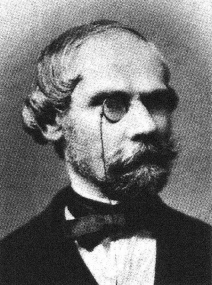

Speaker of the House of Magnates
- In office 9 December 1865 – 22 March 1867
- Preceded by: György Apponyi
- Succeeded by: György Majláth Jr.
- In office 16 December 1884 – 3 January 1888
- Preceded by: László Szőgyény-Marich
- Succeeded by: Miklós Vay

Personal details
- Born: 24 April 1822 Buda, Kingdom of Hungary, Austrian Empire
- Died: 3 January 1888 (aged 65) Battyán, Austria-Hungary
- Party: Conservative Party; Deák Party; Opposition Party
- Profession: Politician

Baron Pál Sennyey de Kissennye (24 April 1822 – 3 January 1888) was a Hungarian conservative politician, who served as Speaker of the House of Magnates twice; between 1865 and 1867 and from 1884 to 1888, his death. He also functioned as chairman of the Royal Council of Governor (1865–1867), Master of the Treasury (1865–1867) and Lord Chief Justice (1884–1888).

Sennyey strongly opposed the Hungarian Revolution of 1848. He participated in development of the Austro-Hungarian Compromise after 1862. He was the leader of the conservative landowners' Right-wing Opposition which left the governing Liberal Party in 1875.

Political offices
| Preceded by György Apponyi | Speaker of the House of Magnates; 1865–1867 | Succeeded by György Majláth Jr. |
| Preceded by László Szőgyény-Marich | Speaker of the House of Magnates; 1884–1888 | Succeeded by Miklós Vay |
| Preceded by György Majláth Jr. | Judge royal 1884–1888 | Succeeded by László Szőgyény-Marich |
