= Perényi =

Perényi may refer to:

- Béla Perényi, Hungarian chess player
- Eleanor Perenyi, American gardener and garden writer
- Péter Perényi, Comes of Temesvár
- Péter Perényi (1502–1548), Voivode of Transylvania
- Miklós Perényi, (born 5 January 1948), Hungarian cellist
- Zsigmond Perényi (disambiguation)
