= Aurél Dessewffy (1846–1928) =

Hungarian politician

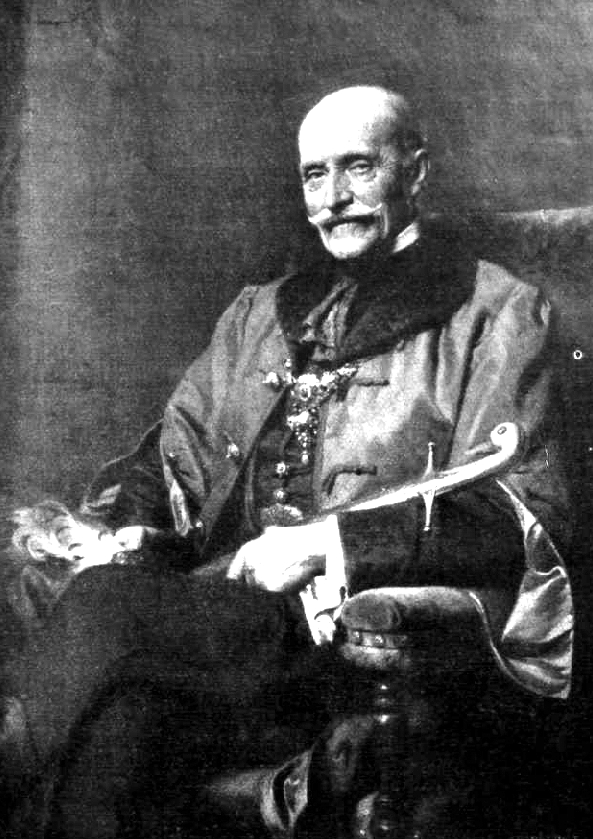

Speaker of the House of Magnates
- In office 17 May 1906 – 10 February 1910
- Preceded by: Albin Csáky
- Succeeded by: Albin Csáky

Personal details
- Born: 16 January 1846; Bűdszentmihály, Kingdom of Hungary (today part of Tiszavasvári, Hungary)
- Died: 28 March 1928 (aged 82); Budapest, Kingdom of Hungary
- Profession: politician

Count Aurél Dessewffy de Csernek et Tarkeő (16 January 1846 – 28 March 1928) was a Hungarian politician, who served as Speaker of the House of Magnates between 1906 and 1910. He also functioned as board member of the Hungarian Academy of Sciences (MTA). He was the last judge royal of the Kingdom of Hungary from 1917 to 1918.

He was the son of Count Emil Dessewffy, president of the Hungarian Academy of Sciences. Aurél married Countess Pálma Károlyi, the single daughter of Count Tibor Károlyi, who served as Speaker of the House of Magnates between 1898 and 1900.

== Works ==
- Közlekedés ügyében tárgyalt kérdések (co-author with Endre György, Budapest, 1881)
- A gazdakör hitelügyi bizottságának emlékirata (co-author with József Schmidt, Budapest, 1884)

Political offices
Preceded by Albin Csáky	Speaker of the House of Magnates; 1906–1910	Succeeded by Albin Csáky
Preceded by Béla Orczy	Judge royal 1917–1918	Succeeded by office abolished
