= Gyula Szapáry =

Hungarian politician

Count Gyula Szapáry de Szapár, Muraszombat et Széchy-Sziget
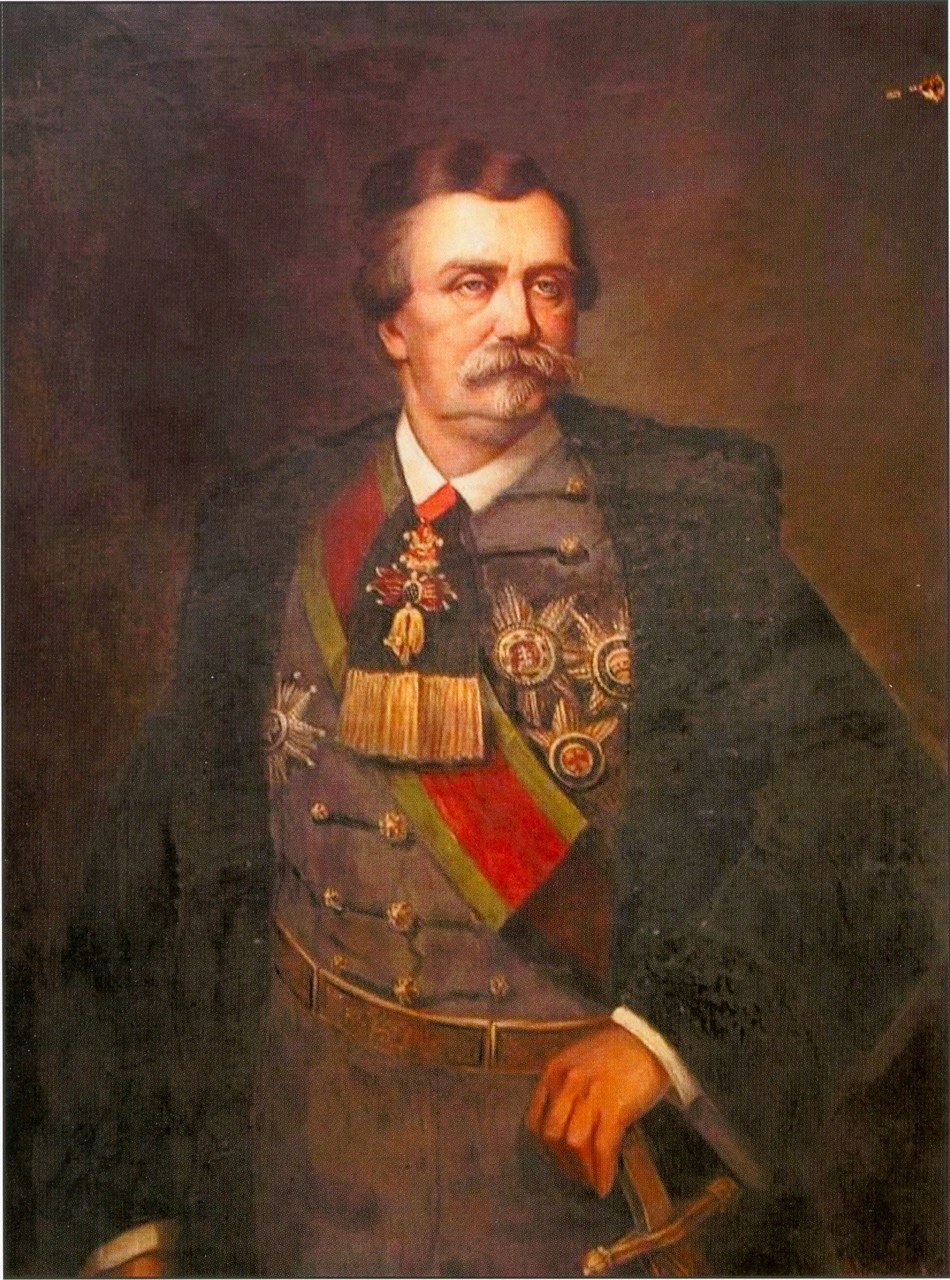
- Portrait

Prime Minister of the Kingdom of Hungary
- In office 13 March 1890 – 17 November 1892
- Monarch: Francis Joseph I
- Preceded by: Kálmán Tisza
- Succeeded by: Sándor Wekerle

Personal details
- Born: 1 November 1832 Pest, Kingdom of Hungary, Austrian Empire
- Died: 20 January 1905 (aged 72) Abbázia, Austria-Hungary
- Party: Address Party (1861–1865); Liberal Party (1875–1892)
- Spouse: Karolina Festetics de Tolna
- Children: György Ágost József; Lőrinc Ágoston Gyula; József Károly Gyula; Ferenc; Amália Ilma Anna Karolina; Sarolta; Emerika Mária Rozália

Count Gyula Szapáry de Szapár, Muraszombat et Széchy-Sziget, Archaically English: Julius Szapáry, French: Jules Szapáry (1 November 1832 – 20 January 1905) was a Hungarian politician who served as Prime Minister of Hungary from 1890 to 1892.

== Biography ==
Born into a prominent Hungarian noble family and large estate owners. His parents were Count József Szapáry, a royal counselor and Baroness Anna Orczy de Orczi. He was a cousin of Count Frigyes Szapáry, who served as ambassador at St. Petersburg at the outbreak of World War I.

Szapáry married Countess Karolina Festetics de Tolna (1838–1919). They had seven children (including Lőrinc Szapáry). His great-grandchild is György Szapáry economist, former deputy governor of the Hungarian National Bank and ambassador to the United States from January 2011 to January 2015.

=== Political career ===
He studied law, entered the government service and became Viscount (vicecomes) of Heves County. He spent nine legislative sessions for the Liberal Party as a representative in the Diet of Hungary. He was elected Count (comes) of Heves in 1867. In 1870 he became Secretary to the Transport Ministry, Interior Minister in 1873, finance minister from 1878 to 1887 in the cabinet of Kálmán Tisza, then also Minister for Transport and Minister of Agriculture from 1889.

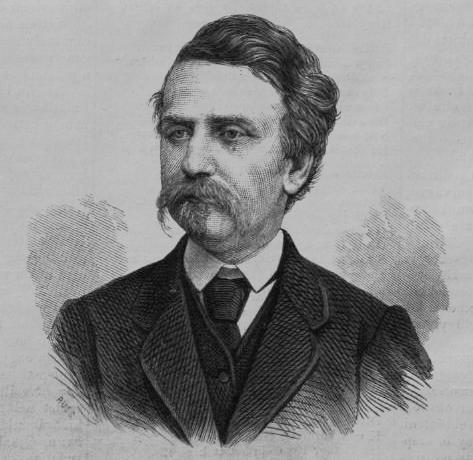
Szapáry in 1873

During his tenure as prime minister of Hungary from 13 March 1890 to 17 November 1892 were laws to promote the industrial, social reform and currency reform, switching silver-based Forint to the gold-based Korona, to be carried out by Finance Minister Sándor Wekerle.

Szapáry was a cautious and moderate liberal politician, technocratic, or bureaucrat described, but he was able to rely on experienced ministers, which he had largely taken from the Tisza government. Therefore, his government was essentially also the policy of his predecessor. An administrative and ecclesiastical reform but without success and after the national opposition won the parliamentary elections 1892. Sándor Wekerle succeeded him.

Wekerle, Dezső Szilágyi, Gábor Baross and Albin Csáky were all members of his cabinet. The relative success of his government was possible due to the high ministers. Szapáry was appointed Master of the Treasury in 1900. He served as president of the Credit Bank since 1904.

=== Personal life ===
He married Karolina Festetics de Tolna on 30 May 1864 with whom he had 7 children including Lőrinc Szapáry.

Political offices
Preceded by Vilmos Tóth	Minister of the Interior; 1873–1875	Succeeded by Kálmán Tisza
Preceded by Kálmán Tisza	Minister of Finance; 1878–1887	Succeeded by Kálmán Tisza
Preceded by Tamás Péchy	Minister of Public Works and Transport; Acting; 1880	Succeeded by Pál Ordódy
Preceded by Pál Széchenyi	Minister of Agriculture, Industry and Trade; 1889	Succeeded by Himself; Agriculture
Preceded by Pál Széchenyi	Minister of Agriculture, Industry and Trade; 1889	Succeeded by Gábor Baross; Trade
Preceded by Himself; Agriculture, Industry and Trade	Minister of Agriculture; 1889–1890	Succeeded by András Bethlen
Preceded by Kálmán Tisza	Prime Minister of Hungary; 1890–1892	Succeeded by Sándor Wekerle
Preceded by Géza Teleki	Minister of the Interior; 1890–1892	Succeeded by Károly Hieronymi
