= Zsigmond Perényi =

Zsigmond Perényi is the name of:

- Zsigmond Perényi (1783–1849), Speaker of the House of Magnates (1849)
- Zsigmond Perényi (1870–1946), Minister of the Interior (1919), Speaker of the House of Magnates (1943–1944)
