= House of Magnates =

Former chamber of the Hungarian parliament

House of Magnates Főrendiház
- Coat of arms of the Lands of the Holy Hungarian Crown (1915–1918, 1919–1946)

Type
- Type: Upper house of the Diet of Hungary

Leadership
- Speaker (first): György Mailáth senior (1848)
- Speaker (last): Jenő Rátz (1944–1945)

Meeting place
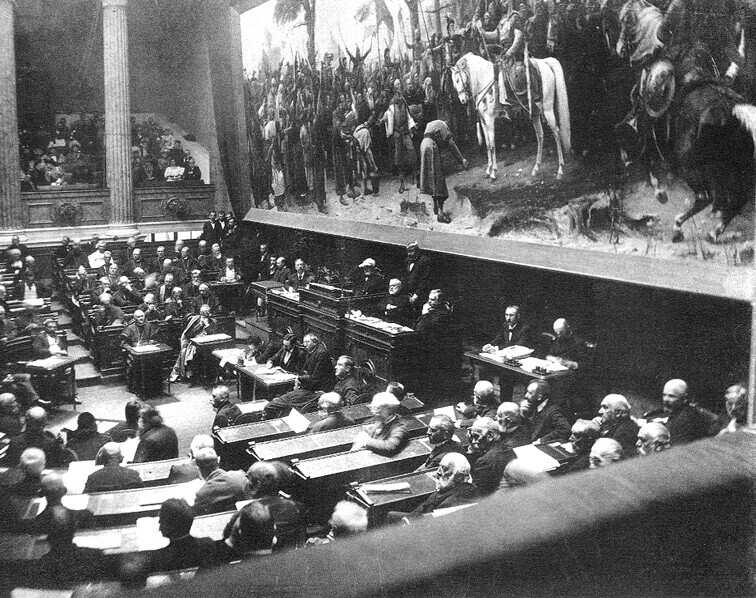
- Debating chamber of the House of Magnates; Hungarian Parliament Building; Budapest

The House of Magnates (Hungarian: Főrendiház; German: Magnatenhaus; Romanian: Camera Magnaților; Italian: Camera dei Magnati) was the upper chamber of the Diet of Hungary. This chamber was operational from 1867 to 1918 and subsequently from 1927 to 1945.

The house was, like the current House of Lords in the United Kingdom, composed of hereditaries, ecclesiastics, and, unlike the House of Lords, deputized representatives from autonomous regions (similar to Resident Commissioners of United States territories). The House had no fixed membership size, as anyone who met the qualifications could sit in it. The official list was composed of:

- Princes of the Royal House who have attained their majority (16 in 1904)
- Hereditary peers who paid at least 3000 florins a year land tax (237 in 1904) (2.178 kg of gold; at its 1896 exchange rate, £1 was worth 12 florins, so this comes to £250)
- High dignitaries of the Roman Catholic and Eastern Orthodox churches (42 in 1904)
- Representatives of the Protestant confessions (13 in 1904)
- Life peers appointed by the Crown, not exceeding 50 in number, and life peers elected by the house itself (73 altogether in 1904)
- Various state dignitaries and high judges (19 in 1904)
- Three delegates of Croatia-Slavonia

For a full list of the speakers, see List of speakers of the House of Magnates.

The modern parliament of Hungary, the National Assembly, is unicameral and meets in the lower house, while the old upper house is used as a conference and meeting room and for tourism.

The shaping of the House of Parliament grew out of conscious choices of symbolism and carries important historical and political messages. Viewing it from the side of the Danube, we see the halls of the lower and upper houses rise on both sides of the dome surrounded by turrets, which evoke the memory of the bicameral parliament that was in operation when the building was being constructed. The two halls are completely identical in size and shape, thus expressing the equality between the representative lower house and the historical upper house. The dome rising between them signifies the unity of the legislature as well as serving as the venue for joint sittings of the two chambers.

== Gallery ==
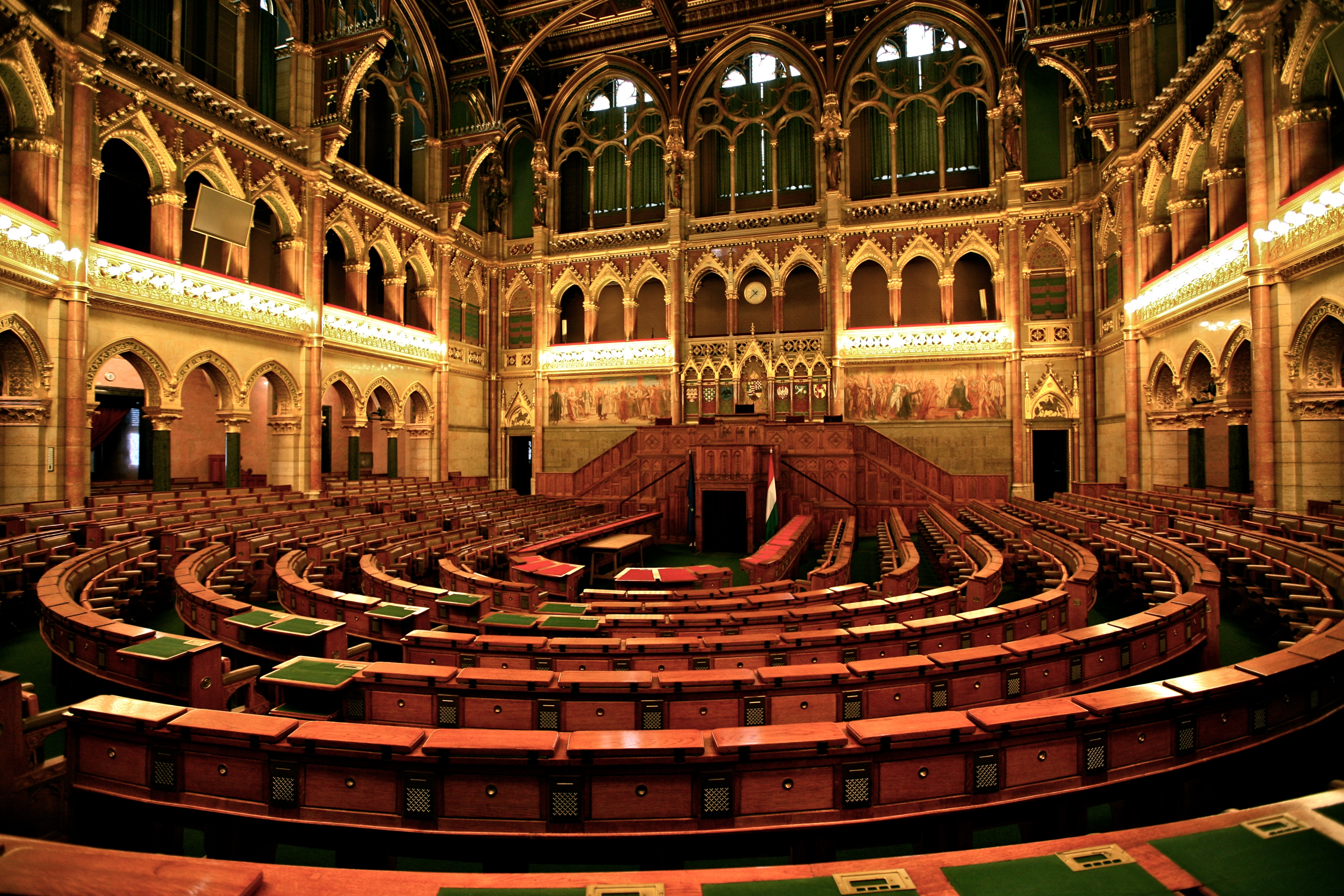
Assembly hall of the House of Magnates

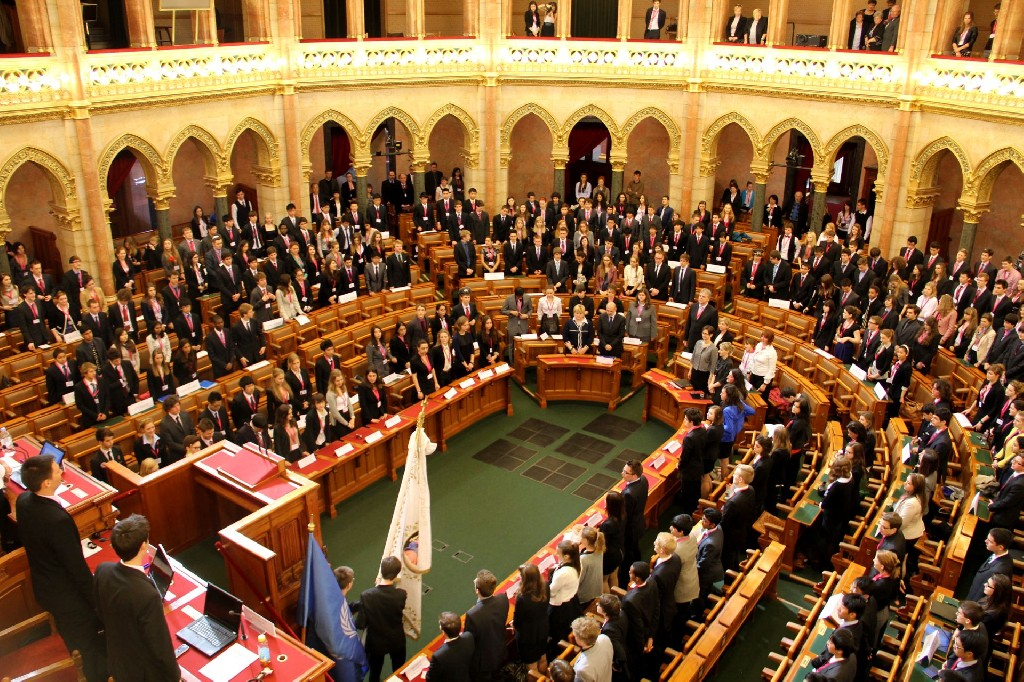
United Nations conference in the assembly hall of the House of Magnates in 2012. Today the Upper House is used as a conference and meeting room and for tourism.

== See also ==
- House of Lords (Austria)
