= Miklós Pálffy (chancellor) =

Count Miklós Pálffy
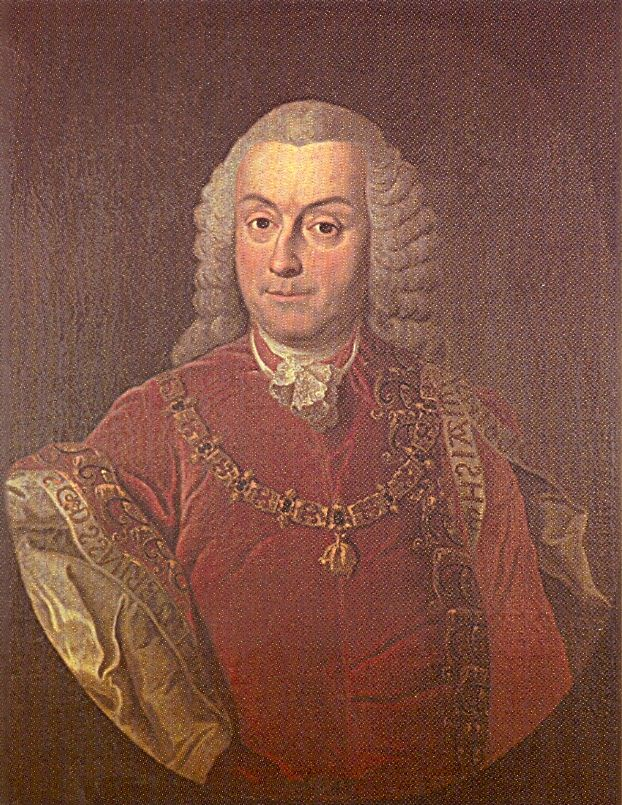

Judge Royal of the Kingdom of Hungary
- In office 1765–1773
- Preceded by: József Illésházy
- Succeeded by: György Fekete

Hungarian Court Chancellor
- In office 1758–1762
- Preceded by: Lipót Flórián Nádasdy
- Succeeded by: Ferenc Esterházy

Personal details
- Born: 4 September 1710 Vienna, Archduchy of Austria
- Died: 6 February 1773 (aged 62) Vienna, Archduchy of Austria
- Spouse: Mária Anna Szidónia von Althann (m. 1733; died 1773)
- Parent(s): Lipót Pálffy; Mária Antonia Ratuit de Souches

Count Miklós Pálffy ab Erdöd (4 September 1710 – 6 February 1773) was a Court Chancellor and Judge Royal.

== Early life ==
Pálffy was born in Vienna on 4 September 1710. He was the son of Count Lipót I József Ignác Kálmán Pálffy (1681–1720) and Countess Mária Antonia Ratuit de Souches.

His father was the eldest son of Count Miklós Pálffy, who was also Judge Royal and the 99th Palatine of the Kingdom of Hungary, and Baroness Katharina Elisabeth von und zu Weichs. His maternal grandparents were Count Karl Ludwig von Souches and Countess Maria Anna Sidonia von Püchheim.

== Career ==
He became an Imperial and Royal Chamberlain in 1732, on 16 January 1734, the chief court master of Hungary. On 7 October 1739, he became a councilor at the Hungarian Court Chancellery, for which he took the oath on 6 October 1741 and was immediately given the chair after the chancellor. On 5 October 1745, he won the Roman Imperial Privy Council from the favor of Emperor Francis I. On 4 June 1746, according to the decree of Queen Maria Theresa, he received appointment as a Real Inner Secret Privy Councilor. On 8 July of the same year, he unexpectedly resigned from the Chancellery Councillorship, but on 15 March 1758, he became the chief chancellor of Hungary.

On 13 November 1759, he received the Order of the Golden Fleece from Emperor Francis I. On 28 September 1760, he swore in the newly established Hungarian Noble Guard as a royal commissioner in Pressburg. On 27 November 1762, he resigned from the chancellorship and also the seven-person board. On 27 April 1765, Maria Theresa appointed him Judge Royal of Hungary. On 30 July 1767, Emperor Joseph II made him a Grand Cross of the Order of Saint Stephen of Hungary.

== Personal life ==
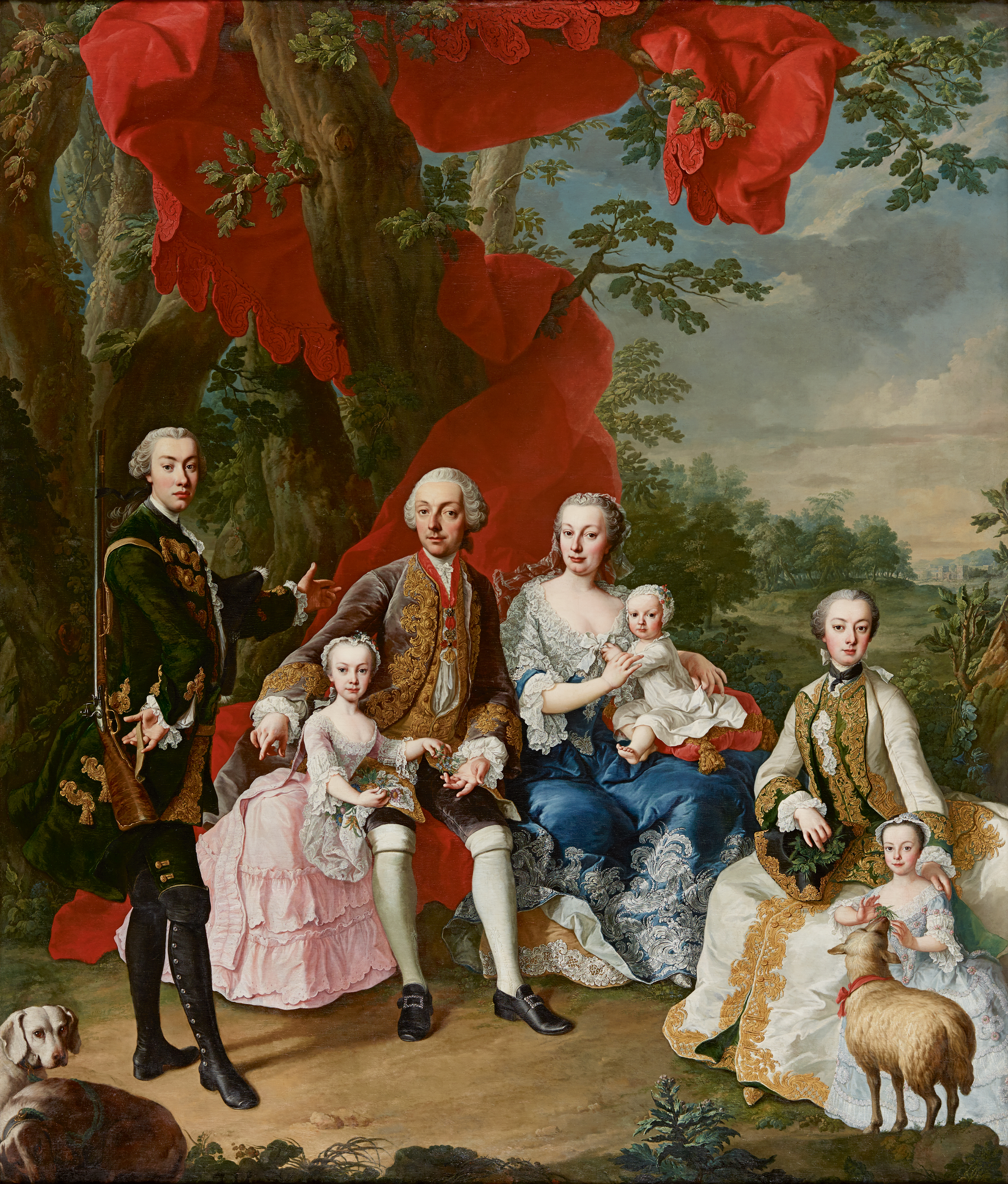
Pálffy and his family

On 12 January 1733 in Vienna, Pálffy married Countess Mária Anna Szidónia von Althann (1715–1790), the daughter of János Mihály von Althann, a large landowner in Csáktornya, and Maria Anna Giuseppina Pignatelli (niece of Giulio Pignatelli, 2nd Prince of Noia). Together, they were the parents of:

- Countess Mária Antónia Jozefa Janka Pálffy (b. 1733), who died young.
- Prince Károly József Jeromos Pálffy (1735–1816), who also served as Court Chancellor from 1787 to 1807 and was created a Prince upon his retirement; he married Princess Maria Theresia Anna of Liechtenstein, a daughter of Prince Emanuel of Liechtenstein and Countess Maria Anna Antonia von Dietrichstein-Weichselstädt, in 1763.
- Countess Mária Anna Jozefa Franciska de Paula Pálffy (1747–1799), who married Count János Baptist Esterhazy de Galántha, youngest son of Count Miklós Esterházy.
- Count Pál János József Ferenc Benedek Nepomuki János Pálffy (1752–1752), who died in infancy.
- Countess Franciska Seraphina Mária Janka Jozefa Francika de Paula Pálffy (1753–1778), who married Lajos, 3rd Prince Batthyány-Strattmann, eldest son of Ádám Wenzel, 2nd Prince Batthyány-Strattmann and Countess Mária Terézia Illésházy de Illésháza.
- Countess Mária Terézia Janka Jozefa Franciska de Paula Mária Anna Pálffy (1760–1833), who married Count István Zichy de Zich et Vásonkeö, a brother of Count Károly Zichy.

Pálffy died in Vienna on 6 February 1773.

=== Descendants ===
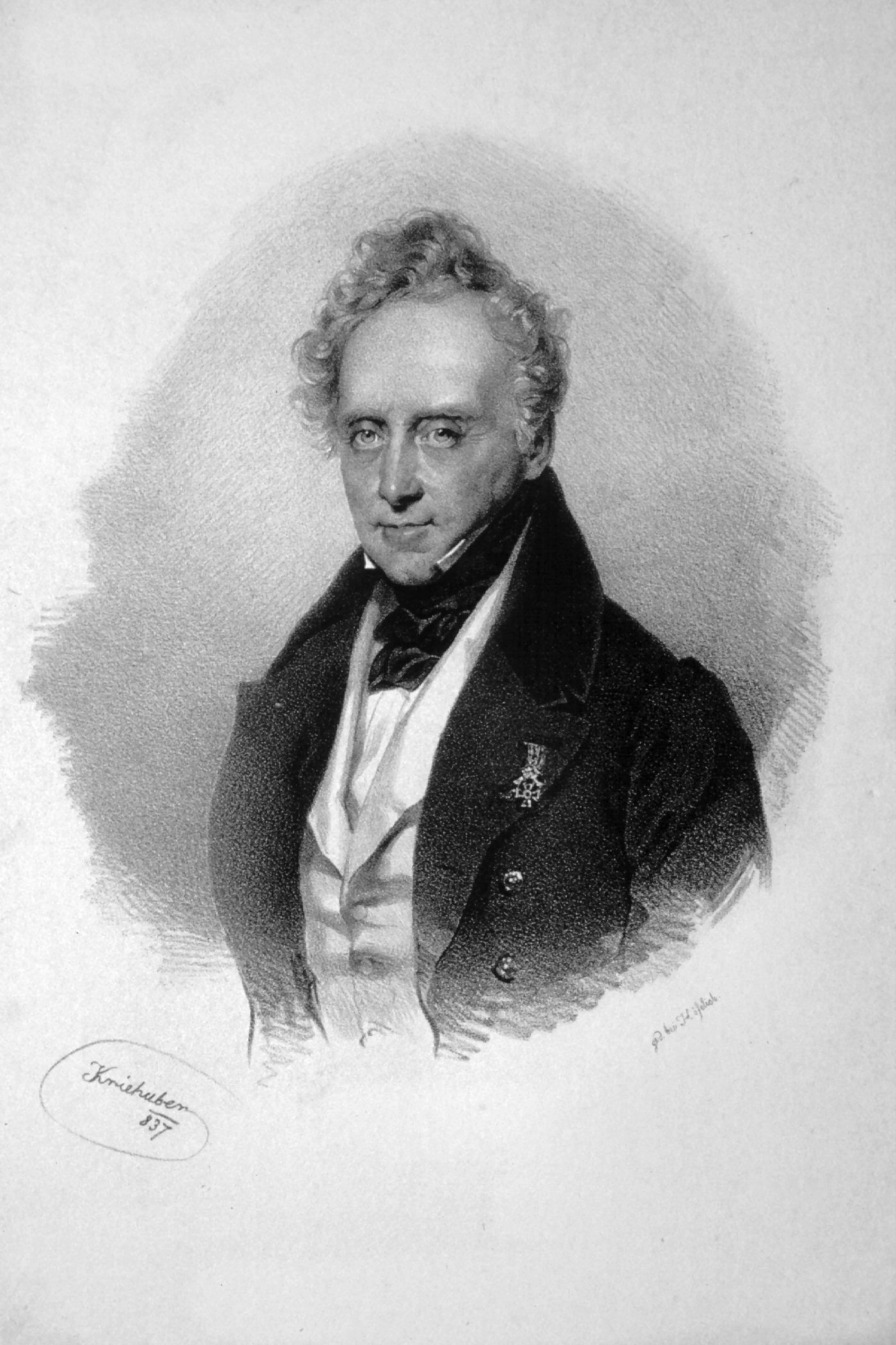
Engraving of his grandson, Fülöp "Philip", 4th Prince Batthyány-Strattmann

Through his daughter Franciska, he was a grandfather of Fülöp "Philip", 4th Prince Batthyány-Strattmann (1781–1870)
