= Tibor Károlyi =

Tibor Károlyi is the name of:

- Tibor Károlyi (chess player)
- Tibor Károlyi (politician)
