= List of speakers of the House of Magnates =

Speaker of House of Magnates
- A Mágnások Házának elnöke
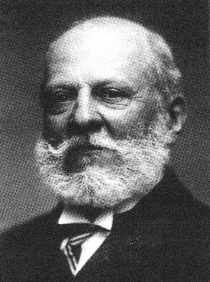
- Longest serving György Mailáth junior 22 March 1867 – 29 March 1883
- House of Magnates
- Type: Speaker
- Member of: Diet of Hungary
- Formation: 25 June 1848
- First holder: György Mailáth senior
- Final holder: Jenő Rátz
- Abolished: 28 March 1945

The Speaker of the House of Magnates (Hungarian: A Mágnások Házának elnöke) was the presiding officer of the House of Magnates, the upper chamber of the Diet of Hungary.

The House of Magnates was initially established during the Hungarian Revolution of 1848, and existed with interruptions between 1848 and 1918.

== List of officeholders ==
=== 1848–1918 ===
Parties KP EP DP/SZP/NMP OAP Independent

No.	Portrait	Name (Birth–Death)	Term of office			Political party
No.	Portrait	Name (Birth–Death)	Took office	Left office	Tenure	Political party
1		György Mailáth senior (1786–1861)	25 June 1848	31 December 1848	189 days	KP
2		Zsigmond Perényi (1783–1849)	1 January 1849	11 August 1849	222 days	EP
The National Assembly was disbanded (11 August 1849 – 6 April 1861)
3		György Apponyi (1808–1899)	6 April 1861	22 August 1861	138 days	KP
The National Assembly was disbanded (22 August 1861 – 9 December 1865)
4		Pál Sennyey (1822–1888)	9 December 1865	22 March 1867	1 year, 103 days	DP
5		György Mailáth junior (1818–1883)	22 March 1867	29 March 1883	16 years, 7 days	KP
6		László Szőgyény-Marich (1806–1893)	25 May 1883	7 December 1884	1 year, 196 days	SZP
(4)		Pál Sennyey (1822–1888)	16 December 1884	3 January 1888	3 years, 18 days	Independent
7		Miklós Vay (1802–1894)	17 January 1888	13 May 1894	6 years, 116 days	Independent
8		József Szlávy (1818–1900)	16 September 1894	3 October 1896	2 years, 17 days	SZP
9		Vilmos Tóth (1832–1898)	22 November 1896	14 June 1898	1 year, 204 days	SZP
10		Tibor Károlyi (1843–1904)	17 June 1898	2 October 1900	2 years, 107 days	SZP
11		Albin Csáky (1841–1912)	2 October 1900	19 February 1906	5 years, 140 days	SZP
12		Aurél Dessewffy (1846–1928)	17 May 1906	10 February 1910	3 years, 269 days	Independent
(11)		Albin Csáky (1841–1912)	18 June 1910	21 September 1912	2 years, 95 days	NMP
13		Sámuel Jósika (1848–1923)	21 September 1912	19 June 1917	4 years, 271 days	NMP
14		Endre Hadik-Barkóczy (1862–1931)	19 June 1917	22 June 1918	1 year, 3 days	OAP
15		Gyula Wlassics (1852–1937)	22 June 1918	16 November 1918	147 days	OAP

During the First Hungarian Republic the House of Magnates was replaced by the National Council. During the Hungarian Soviet Republic it was replaced by the National Assembly of Soviets. During the Kingdom of Hungary it was replaced by a unicameral National Assembly between 1920 and 1927. It was re-established between 1927 and 1945.

=== 1927–1945 ===
Parties MÉP Independent

No.	Portrait	Name (Birth–Death)	Term of office			Political party
No.	Portrait	Name (Birth–Death)	Took office	Left office	Tenure	Political party
(15)		Gyula Wlassics (1852–1937)	31 January 1927	8 March 1935	8 years, 36 days	Independent
16		Bertalan Széchényi (1866–1943)	1 May 1935	3 June 1943	8 years, 33 days	Independent
17		Zsigmond Perényi (1870–1946)	23 October 1943	3 November 1944	1 year, 11 days	MÉP
18		Jenő Rátz (1882–1952)	8 November 1944	28 March 1945	140 days	MÉP

== See also ==
- List of speakers of the House of Representatives (Hungary)
- List of speakers of the National Assembly (Hungary)

== Sources ==
- Official website of the National Assembly of Hungary (in Hungarian)
