= László Szőgyény-Marich Sr. =

Hungarian politician

László Szőgyény-Marich
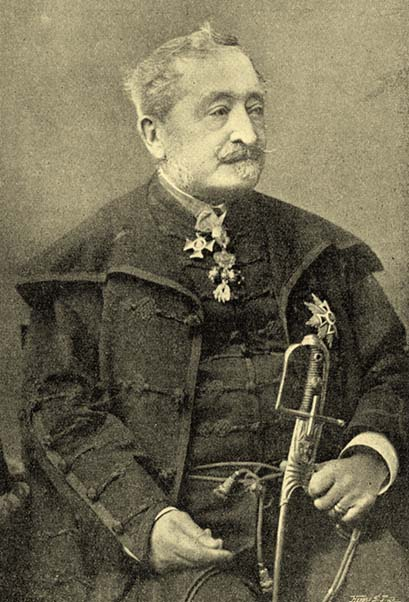
- Photograph by Károly Koller

Speaker of the House of Magnates
- In office 25 May 1883 – 7 December 1884
- Preceded by: György Majláth Jr.
- Succeeded by: Pál Sennyey

Personal details
- Born: 2 January 1806; Pest, Kingdom of Hungary
- Died: 19 November 1893 (aged 87); Székesfehérvár, Austria-Hungary
- Political party: Deák Party (1865-1875); Liberal Party (1875-1893)
- Spouse: Mária Marich de Szolgaegyháza
- Children: László; Róza; Gyula; Géza; Júlia; Fanny; Mária; Ferenc
- Profession: politician

László Szőgyény-Marich de Magyar-Szőgyén et Szolgaegyháza (2 January 1806 – 19 November 1893) was a Hungarian politician, who served as Speaker of the House of Magnates between 1883 and 1884. He also functioned as Imperial and Royal Chamberlain, Privy Councillor, Knight of the Golden Fleece, board member of the Hungarian Academy of Sciences, Master of the Treasury (1884–1888) and Lord Chief Justice (1888–1893).

His son was Count László Szőgyény-Marich Jr., an Austro-Hungarian diplomat, ambassador, Minister besides the King of Hungary.

== Biography ==
He was born as László Szőgyény de Magyar-Szőgyén into a noble family, son of Vice Chancellor Zsigmond Szőgyény and Júlia Pászthory. He started his studies at Theresianum in Vienna then attended Faculty of Humanities and Law at University of Pest. He was awarded doctor of philosophy at the age of 18. He became honorary deputy recorder, then recorder of Pest County. From 1844 he served as Councillor in the Hungarian Royal Court Chancellery. He was appointed Court Chancellor but resigned from this position during the Hungarian Revolution of 1848 when the chancellery was dissolved. He became a National Guard but did not fight in battles.

He was a member of the Imperial Council in 1851 where he sought to restore the old Hungarian constitution. He served as Vice Chairman of the Council in 1859. On 20 October 1860, when the Court Chancellery restored, he was appointed Vice Chancellor. He resigned after dissolution of the Diet in 1861.

Szőgyény-Marich served as board member of the Hungarian Academy of Sciences since 1855. He was appointed Lord Lieutenant (Count; comes) of Fejér County in 1865. He held this position until 1883. He became a member of the House of Magnates. He was appointed Speaker of the Upper House, when his predecessor, György Majláth was murdered in March 1883. He retired from the politics in 1885.

=== Family ===
He married Mária Marich de Szolgaegyháza, the only daughter of István Dávid Marich de Szolgaegyháza and Baroness Franciska Kray de Topolya. As only descendant of the Marich family she could inherit. László Szőgyény was authorized by King Francis Joseph to adopt his wife's surname. Name and coat-of-arms of the two families were united.

They had eight children, the eldest one was László. Their other son, Géza served as Member of Parliament and Master of Treasury.

Political offices
Preceded by György Majláth Jr.	Speaker of the House of Magnates; 1883–1884	Succeeded by Pál Sennyey
Preceded by Pál Sennyey	Judge royal 1888–1893	Succeeded by Béla Orczy
