= Pál Rajner =

Hungarian politician

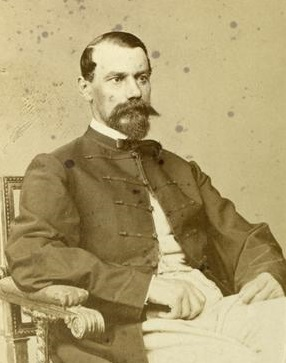

Minister of the Interior of Hungary
- In office 21 October 1869 – 10 February 1871
- Preceded by: Béla Wenckheim
- Succeeded by: Vilmos Tóth

Personal details
- Born: 28 February 1823 Pest, Hungary
- Died: 18 January 1879 (aged 55) Lontó, Hungary
- Party: Deák Party
- Profession: politician

Pál Rajner (28 February 1823 – 9 September 1879) was a Hungarian politician, who served as Interior Minister between 1869 and 1871. He took part in the Hungarian Revolution of 1848. Count Gyula Andrássy appointed him as Interior Minister. In 1871 Rajner resigned because of his neurological disorders. Later he died by suicide.

Political offices
Preceded by Béla Wenckheim	Minister of the Interior; 1869–1871	Succeeded by Vilmos Tóth
