= Mailáth (disambiguation) =

Mailáth may refer to:

== Persons and fictional characters ==
- Alternative spelling of Majláth, Hungarian surname
- Andreas Mailath-Pokorny (born 1959), Austrian university rector, diplomat, and politician
- Tessa Mailáth, character from the 2013 Australian film Foreshadow

== Places ==
- Mailáth, Hungarian name of Prestavlky, village and municipality in Žiar nad Hronom District in Slovakia
- Mailáth (Alsó-Majláth (Lower Mailáth), Felső-Majláth (Lower Mailáth)), district of Diósgyőr, now part of Miskolc

== See also ==
- Mailat, Arad (Hungarian: Majláthfalva, "Majláth village"), village in Vinga commune, Arad County, Banat, Romania
- Mailat
