= György Apponyi =

Hungarian politician (1808–1899)

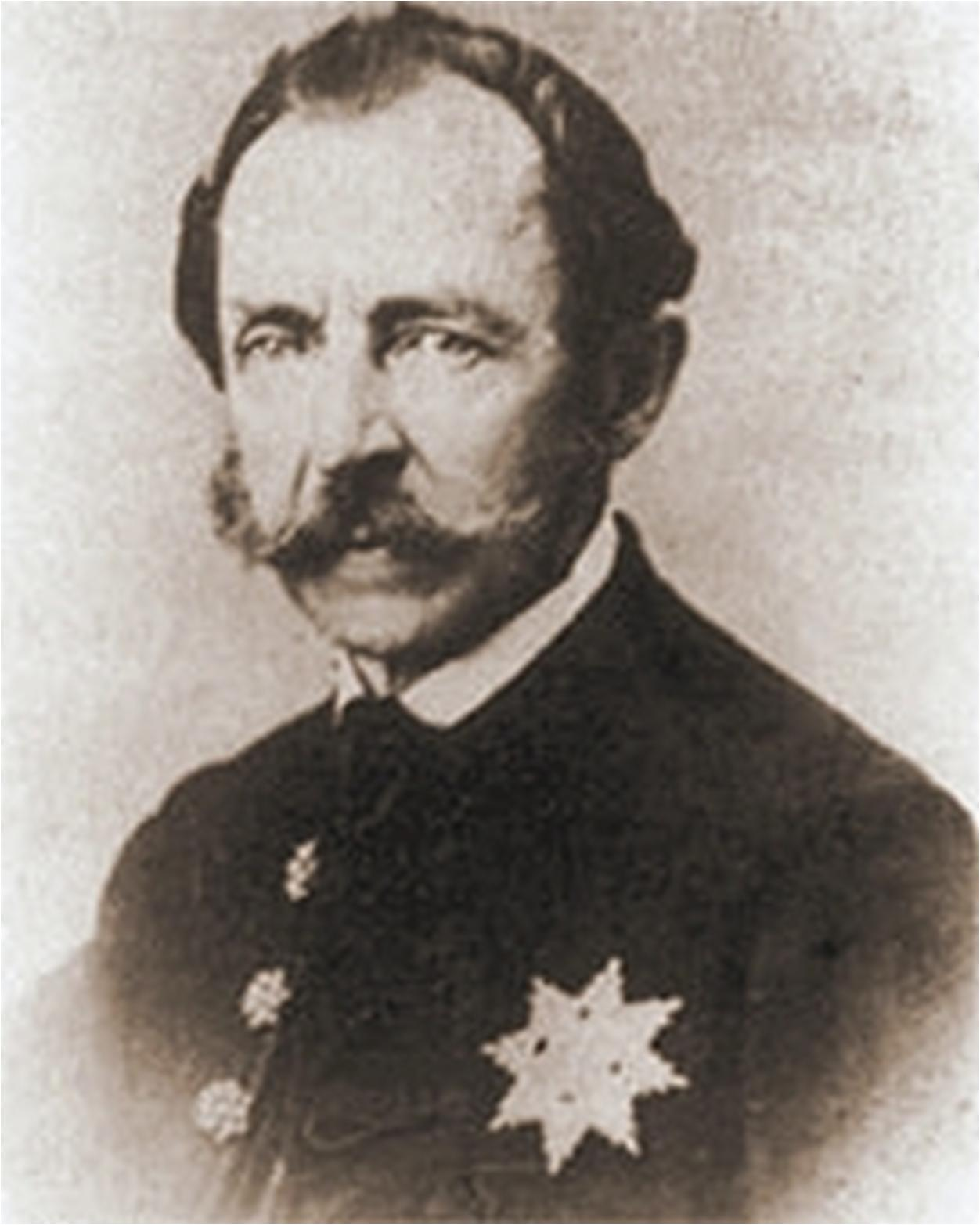

Speaker of the House of Magnates
- In office 6 April 1861 – 22 August 1861
- Preceded by: Zsigmond Perényi
- Succeeded by: Pál Sennyey

Personal details
- Born: 29 December 1808 Pozsony, Kingdom of Hungary (today Bratislava, Slovakia)
- Died: 28 February 1899 (aged 90) Éberhárd, Austria-Hungary (today Malinovo, Slovakia)
- Political party: Conservative Party
- Spouse: Countess Júlia Sztáray
- Children: Georgina; Albert
- Profession: politician

Count György Apponyi de Nagyappony (29 December 1808 – 28 February 1899) was a Hungarian conservative politician, who served as Lord Chancellor of Hungary from 1846 to 1848. He was a member of the Hungarian Academy of Sciences since 1858. He was appointed Speaker of the House of Magnates in 1861 when Emperor Francis Joseph I convened Hungarian Diet of 1861. As leader of the "old conservative" group he participated in development of the Austro-Hungarian Compromise after 1862.

== Career ==
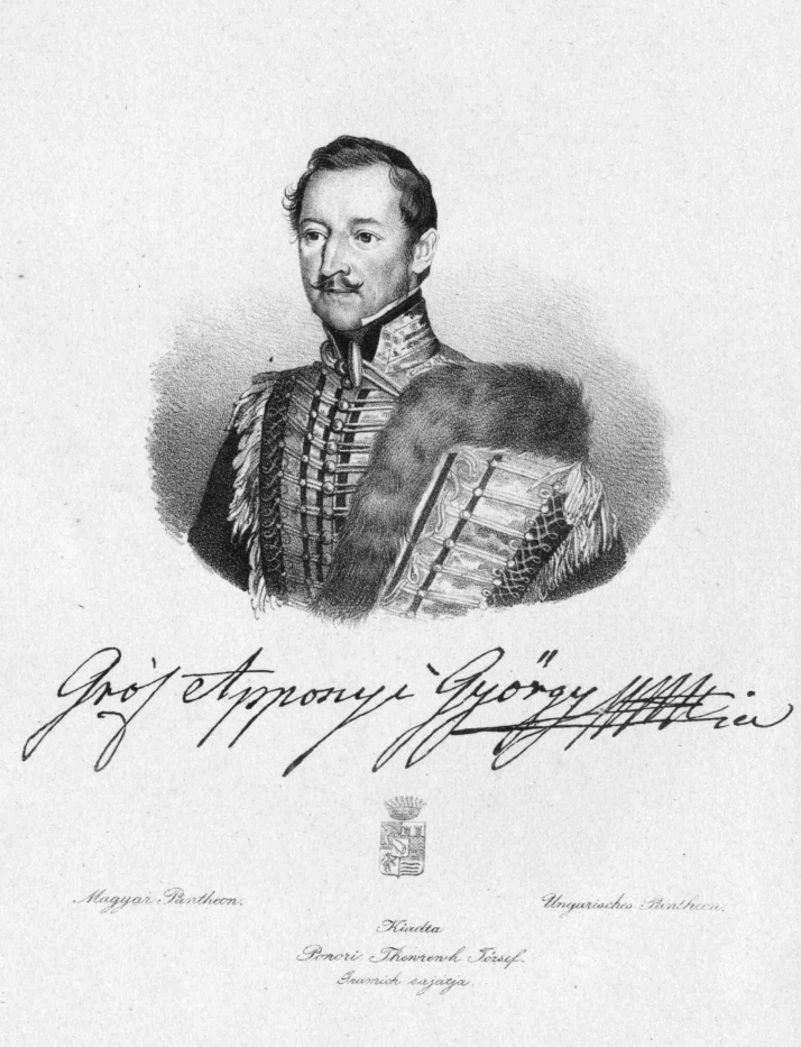
György Apponyi

György Apponyi came from the noble Apponyi family. He served as a secretary of the Hungarian Court Chancellery. From 1843/44 he became politically active. As the Court Chancellor, he led from 1844 to the conservative-aristocratic party, and brought as a staunch opponent of all Hungarian nationalist aspirations through its system of Komitatsadministratoren the opposition against her. An agreement with opposition leader Lajos Kossuth failed because of the outbreak of the revolution of 1848/49.

As unemployed by the revolution in Hungary, he retired, first, in 1859, Count Apponyi became a lifelong member of the Vienna Parliament. He fought for the independence of Hungary and was an influential leader of the national party. On 20 October 1860 he was Judex Curiae in Pest, where he chaired the conference for the reorganization of the Hungarian jurisdiction.

As an authorized Commissioner, he opened on 6 April 1861 the Parliament in Budapest led the bureau and the House of Magnates. After the dissolution of the Diet (21 August), he remained in office as Judex Curiae. Hopes that he would balance between Austria and Hungary to bring about came true, not, whereupon it on 8 April 1863 resigned his office. Apart from his participation in the state parliament in 1865 and several meetings of the House of Magnates since withdrawn from living in Pozsony.

His son was Albert Apponyi, Speaker of the House of Representatives, Minister of Religion and Education and leader of the Hungarian delegation to the Versailles Peace Conference to present Hungary’s case to the Allied and Associated Powers assembled there to determine the terms of the peace treaty with Hungary, which subsequently became known as the Treaty of Trianon on account of it having been signed in the Grand Hall of the Palace of Trianon.

Political offices
Preceded by György Majláth	Judge royal 1860–1863	Succeeded by György Andrássy
Preceded by Zsigmond Perényi	Speaker of the House of Magnates; 1861	Succeeded by Pál Sennyey
