= Zsigmond Perényi (1783–1849) =

Hungarian politician

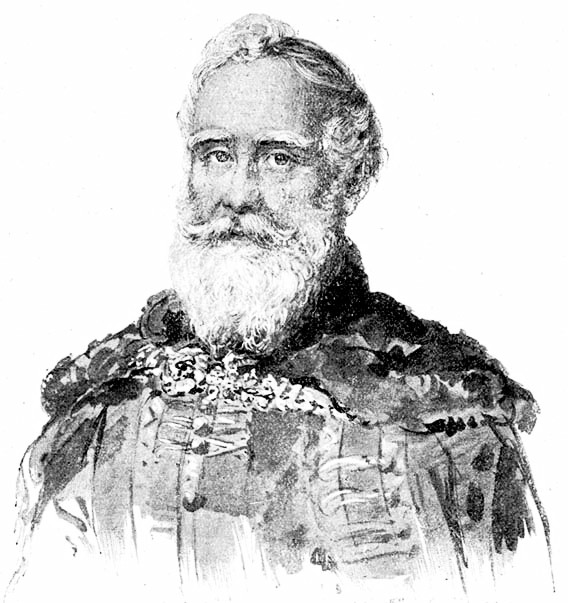

Speaker of the House of Magnates
- In office 1 January 1849 – 11 August 1849
- Preceded by: György Majláth Sr.
- Succeeded by: György Apponyi

Personal details
- Born: 18 November 1783; Beregszász-Végardó, Kingdom of Hungary (today part of Berehove, Ukraine)
- Died: 24 October 1849 (aged 65); Pest, Kingdom of Hungary
- Political party: Opposition Party
- Profession: politician

Baron Zsigmond Perényi de Perény (18 November 1783 – 24 October 1849) was a Hungarian politician, who served as Speaker of the House of Magnates in 1849. After defeat of the Hungarian Revolution of 1848 he was executed because his name appeared in the Hungarian Declaration of Independence which was declared by the Diet of Hungary in Debrecen on 14 April 1849.

His grandson was Zsigmond Perényi, Speaker of the House of Magnates and Minister of the Interior.

Political offices
Preceded by György Majláth Sr.	Speaker of the House of Magnates; 1849	Succeeded by György Apponyi
