= Miklós Vay =

Hungarian politician

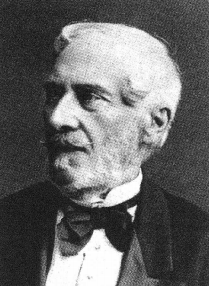

Speaker of the House of Magnates
- In office 17 January 1888 – 13 May 1894
- Preceded by: Pál Sennyey
- Succeeded by: József Szlávy

Personal details
- Born: 29 April 1802 Alsózsolca, Kingdom of Hungary
- Died: 13 May 1894 (aged 92) Budapest, Austria-Hungary
- Profession: Politician

Baron Miklós Vay de Vaja et Laskod (29 April 1802 – 13 May 1894) was a Hungarian politician, who served as Speaker of the House of Magnates from 1888 until his death in 1894.

== Early life ==
Vay was born in Alsózsolca on 29 April 1802. His father was Hussar General Miklós I Vay.

After finishing law studies he managed his family estates.

== Career ==
He participated in the policy of Zemplén County starting in 1825; deputy recorder, then deputy lieutenant (Viscount; vicecomes), emissary in the Diet of Hungary. During the Cholera Riots in 1831 he was appointed government commissioner. He became governor of the Lord Lieutenant of Borsod County in 1831. He served as Lord Lieutenant (Count; comes) of the county from 1865 to 1867.

He functioned as an administrator of the Calvinist Diocese of Tiszántúl from 1840. He was appointed crown guard in 1844. He was a member of the Hungarian Royal Council of Governor (Helytartótanács) in 1845. He was appointed Royal Commissioner to Transylvania by the Cabinet of Lajos Batthyány in June 1848. The Prime Minister realised that he could not compromise with the Emperor, so on 2 October he resigned again and nominated Vay as his successor. However, Vay declined the position. At the end of the year he retired from the politics.

Despite this, he was arrested and sentenced to death after defeat of the Hungarian Revolution of 1848. The punishment was changed to 4 years imprisonment by King Francis Joseph I. He was released after 8 months. He returned to politics after a decade of silence when he participated in the movements of the Protestants against the religious edict. He was appointed Court Chancellor in 1860 but resigned after a year when the King dissolved the Diet of 1861. After the Austro-Hungarian Compromise of 1867, he served as a Crown Guard again. He was appointed Speaker of the House of Magnates in 1888, when his predecessor Pál Sennyey died in office. Vay became Privy Councillor and Chairman of the Calvinist Convention in Hungary.

== Personal life ==
Vay died in Budapest on 13 May 1894, at the age of 92.

Political offices
Preceded by Pál Sennyey	Speaker of the House of Magnates; 1888–1894	Succeeded by József Szlávy
