= Lipót Flórián Nádasdy =

Count Lipót Flórián Nádasdy

Hungarian Court Chancellor
- In office 1746 – 31 May 1758
- Preceded by: Lajos Batthyány
- Succeeded by: Miklós Pálffy

Master of the Treasury of the Kingdom of Hungary
- In office 9 May 1739 – 2 August 1746
- Preceded by: Lajos Batthyány
- Succeeded by: Miklós Pálffy

Personal details
- Born: c. 1697 Felsőlendva
- Died: 31 May 1758 (aged 60–61) Vienna, Archduchy of Austria
- Spouse: Maria Josefa von Trauttmansdorff
- Relations: Ferenc Nádasdy (brother)
- Parent(s): Ferenc IV Nádasdy; Róza von Schrattenbach

Count Lipót Flórián Nádasdy de Nádasd et Fogarasföld (c. 1697 – 31 May 1758) was a Hungarian nobleman, Master of the Treasury from 1739 to 1746, and Court Chancellor from 1746 until his death.

== Early life ==
Count Nádasdy was born in Felsőlendva in 1697. He was eldest son of Ferenc IV Nádasdy de Nádasd et Fogarasföld (c. 1650–1717) and Rosalia "Róza" von Schrattenbach (1673–1717). Among his siblings were Count Ferenc Leopold Nádasdy, a Lieutenant General, Count Boldizsár Nádasdy, an Imperial and Royal Chamberlain, and Count Ferenc Nádasdy, the Ban of Croatia.

His paternal grandparents were Ferenc III Nádasdy de Nádasd et Fogarasföld (a grandson of Count Ferenc II Nádasdy), and Countess Anna Júlia Esterházy de Galántha. His maternal grandparents were Baron Johann Balthasar von Schrattenbach and Countess Anna Elisabeth von Wagensperg.

== Career ==
Nádasdy inherited ownership of the Upper Lendava manor. From 1730 he was a Governor's Councilor, from 1737 an Inner Privy Councilor, from 1739 a Royal Treasurer (tárnokmester), from 1744 the President of the Provincial Committee, from 1746 a Royal Master of the Stables, a Grand Cross of the Order of Saint Stephen and the Chancellor of Hungary.

In 1751, he received the Hereditary Lordship of Komárom County for his family, which his descendants succeeded him after his death.

== Personal life ==
Count Nádasdy was married to Maria Josefa von Trauttmansdorff (1703–1781), a daughter of Maximilian Siegmund von Trauttmansdorff-Weinsberg and Countess Gabriela Barbara von Starhemberg (a daughter of Count Ernst Rüdiger von Starhemberg). Together, they were the parents of:

- Countess Mária Rebeka Nádasdy (1728–1795), who married Count Károly Andrássy de Csíkszentkirály, a son of Baron József Andrássy de Csíkszentkirály.
- Countess Júlia Nádasdy (b. 1731), who married Count János Szunyogh, a son of Count Antal Szunyogh.
- Countess Maria Theresia Nádasdy (1737–1798), who married Count Ferenc Antal von Lamberg, a son of Count Ádám Ferenc von Lamberg.
- Count Mihály Nádasdy de Nádasd (1746–1796), who married Countess Maria Terézia von Colloredo-Waldsee, a daughter of Count Camillo von Colloredo-Waldsee.

Nádasdy died in Vienna, Archduchy of Austria on 31 May 1758.
