= Lőrinc Szapáry =

Hungarian politician (1866–1919)

Austro-Hungarian Ambassador to Chile
- In office 16 December 1912 – 11 August 1916
- Preceded by: Johann Freiherr von Styrcea
- Succeeded by: office abolished

Personal details
- Born: 10 July 1866 Pest, Kingdom of Hungary, Austrian Empire
- Died: 13 July 1919 (aged 53) Perchtoldsdorf, German Austria
- Profession: diplomat

Count Lőrinc Ágoston Gyula Szapáry de Szapár, Muraszombat et Széchy-Sziget (10 July 1866 – 13 July 1919) was a Hungarian diplomat, who served as Austro-Hungarian Ambassador to Chile from 1912 to 1916. The legation in Santiago was established in 1902. The envoy was also accredited to La Paz, Bolivia, and Lima, Peru. He retired in 1918.

He was the second son of former Prime Minister Count Gyula Szapáry and Countess Karolina Festetics.

Diplomatic posts
Preceded by Johann Freiherr von Styrcea	Austro-Hungarian Ambassador to Chile; 1912–1916	Succeeded by office abolished
