= Mailat =

Mailat is a Romanian surname. Notable people with the surname include:

- Denisa Mailat, Romanian rhythmic gymnast
- Maria Mailat (b. 1953), Romanian-French author
- Sebastian Mailat (b. 1997), Romanian professional footballer
- Ștefan Mailat/Majláth István, Voivode of Transylvania (1534-1541). Spelled in various ways, he was part of the Magyarised, initially Romanian aristocratic Mailat/Maylád family.

== See also ==
- List of Romanian noble families from the Kingdom of Hungary and the Principality of Transylvania
- Mailáth (disambiguation)
  - Mailáth/Majláth, Hungarian surname
- Majláth family
- Maylád family
