= Bertalan Széchényi =

Hungarian politician

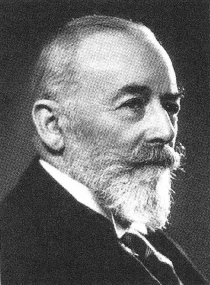

Speaker of the House of Magnates
- In office 1 May 1935 – 3 June 1943
- Preceded by: Gyula Wlassics
- Succeeded by: Zsigmond Perényi

Personal details
- Born: 24 October 1866 Sopron, Kingdom of Hungary
- Died: 3 June 1943 (aged 76) Budapest, Kingdom of Hungary
- Profession: politician

Count Bertalan Széchényi de Sárvár-Felsővidék (24 October 1866 – 3 June 1943) was a Hungarian politician, who served as Speaker of the House of Magnates from 1 May 1935 until his death.

== Biography ==
He was born into a prominent noble family in Sopron on 24 October 1866. His parents were Count Sándor Széchényi, grandson of Count Ferenc Széchényi, Lord Lieutenant (Count; comes) of Tolna County, Deputy Speaker of the House of Magnates since 1905, and Natália Dőry de Jobaháza. He had four siblings, including Lajos Széchényi, an Austro-Hungarian diplomat and ambassador. His uncle was Imre Széchényi, who served as Austro-Hungarian Ambassador to Germany from 1878 to 1892.

He married Countess Natália Andrássy de Csíkszentkirály et Krasznahorka on 11 December 1907. Their only child, Márton was born in 1909.

Bertalan Széchényi graduated law at the University of Budapest. He served in the 7th Hussar Regiment as a reserve officer. He retired as a lieutenant. After that he traveled around the world, including Germany, Italy, Switzerland, Egypt, and some parts of Africa and Anatolia. After returning to home he directed his properties.

He was appointed heritage member of the House of Magnates on 1 June 1894 by King Francis Joseph. He served as recorder of the upper house from 1896 to 1912. He became Imperial and Royal Chamberlain in 1910. He served as Second Deputy Speaker of the House of Magnates between 1912 and 1917. He was a member of the Committee of Economy until 1918. The House of Magnates was dissolved after the Aster Revolution, on 16 November 1918, so he lost his parliamentary seat.

The Upper House of the Parliament was reorganized in 1927 and Count Széchényi became its member. He was a board member of the Hungarian Academy of Sciences since 9 May 1933. He was appointed Speaker of the Upper House in 1935, following Baron Gyula Wlassics in that position. He died in office in 1943. He was succeeded by Baron Zsigmond Perényi.

Political offices
Preceded by Gyula Wlassics	Speaker of the House of Magnates; 1935–1943	Succeeded by Zsigmond Perényi
