= András Bethlen =

Hungarian politician (1847–1898)

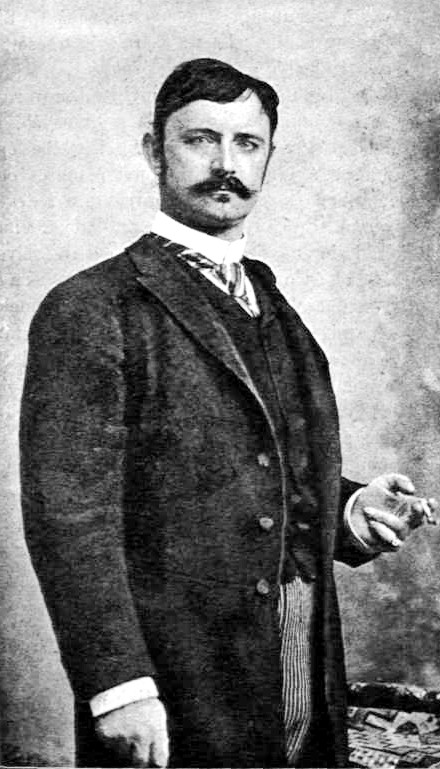

Minister of Agriculture of Hungary
- In office 15 March 1890 – 10 June 1894
- Prime Minister: Gyula Szapáry; Sándor Wekerle
- Preceded by: Gyula Szapáry
- Succeeded by: Géza Fejérváry

Personal details
- Born: 26 July 1847 Kolozsvár, Kingdom of Hungary, Austrian Empire
- Died: 25 August 1898 (aged 51) Bethlen, Austria-Hungary
- Party: Liberal Party
- Profession: politician

Count András Bethlen de Bethlen (26 July 1847 – 25 August 1898) was a Hungarian politician, who served as Minister of Agriculture between 1890 and 1894. He studied law in Budapest and national economy studies in Brussels and Leipzig. He was a member of the Diet of Hungary from 1873 to 1882 in colours of the Liberal Party, which governed Hungary until 1890.

Bethlen served as administrative chief of Brassó County and Szeben County (Count of the Saxons). Count Gyula Szapáry appointed him Minister of Agriculture. Bethlen also hold the office in the next government (first cabinet of Sándor Wekerle). He founded the Institute of Experimental Plant and surveyed the introduction of the agricultural statistics. He also published articles on economics.

Political offices
| Preceded by Gyula Szapáry | Minister of Agriculture; 1890–1894 | Succeeded by Géza Fejérváry |
