= Vilmos Tóth =

Hungarian politician (1832–1898)

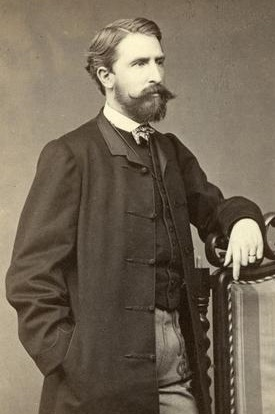

Minister of the Interior of Hungary
- In office 10 February 1871 – 5 March 1873
- Preceded by: Pál Rajner
- Succeeded by: Gyula Szapáry

Personal details
- Born: 28 May 1832 Torontálszécsány, Kingdom of Hungary, Austrian Empire (today Sečanj, Serbia)
- Died: 14 June 1898 (aged 66) Nyitraivánka, Austria-Hungary (today Ivanka pri Nitre, Slovakia)
- Party: Deák Party
- Profession: politician

Vilmos Tóth de Székel (28 May 1832 – 14 June 1898) was a Hungarian politician, who served as Interior Minister between 1871 and 1873.

Political offices
Preceded by Pál Rajner	Minister of the Interior; 1871–1873	Succeeded by Gyula Szapáry
Preceded by József Szlávy	Speaker of the House of Magnates; 1896–1898	Succeeded by Tibor Károlyi
