= Károly Csáky =

Hungarian politician

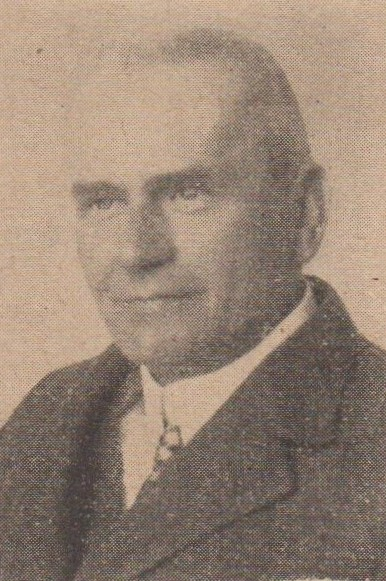
- Born: 10 April 1873; Szepesmindszent, Austria-Hungary
- Died: 30 April 1945 (aged 72); Budapest, Hungary
- Military career
- Allegiance: Austria-Hungary (Kingdom of Hungary) Hungary
- Service years: 1894–1919
- Rank: Cavalry General
- Conflicts: World War I

Count Károly Csáky de Körösszeg et Adorján (10 April 1873 – 30 April 1945) was a Hungarian military officer and politician, who served as Minister of Defence between 1923 and 1929. During World War I he fought on the Eastern Front, where he seriously injured. After the establishment of the Hungarian Soviet Republic he demobilized. In 1923 István Bethlen appointed him as Minister of Defence. As a minister he favoured the Allies examining the cessation of its commission's function, and he covered the gun-running being directed into the country. He also supported the Austrian Heimwehr in the interest of a right wing extremist military coup. In 1929 he resigned from his position. His father was Albin Csáky, a former Minister of Education.

Political offices
| Preceded by Sándor Belitska | Minister of Defence; 1923-1929 | Succeeded by Gyula Gömbös |
