= Károly Hieronymi =

Hungarian politician (1836–1911)

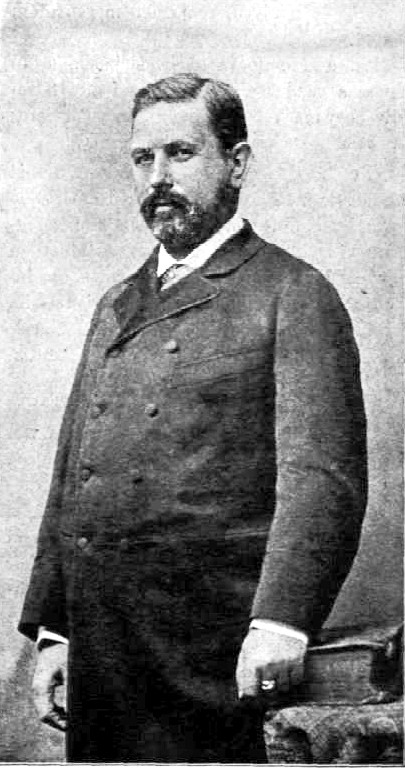

Minister of the Interior of Hungary
- In office 17 November 1892 – 15 January 1895
- Preceded by: Gyula Szapáry
- Succeeded by: Dezső Perczel

Personal details
- Born: 1 October 1836 Buda, Kingdom of Hungary, Austrian Empire
- Died: 4 May 1911 (aged 74) Budapest, Austria-Hungary
- Party: Liberal Party, Party of National Work
- Profession: engineer, politician

Károly Hieronymi (1 October 1836 – 4 May 1911) was a Hungarian engineer and politician, who served as Interior Minister between 1892 and 1895. He was a supporter of former Prime Minister Kálmán Tisza. As Minister of Trade he modernized the train services, for the Hungarian State Railways he nationalized the Budapest-Pécs, the Duna-Dráva and the Zagreb-Karlovac railway lines. He insured the independence of the railway goods turnover aiming at the seaports and its tranquillity.

== Memories ==
In Budapest there is a street named after him. His grave is in the Kerepesi Cemetery.

Political offices
| Preceded by Gyula Szapáry | Minister of the Interior; 1892–1895 | Succeeded by Dezső Perczel |
