= Gyula Wlassics =

Hungarian politician

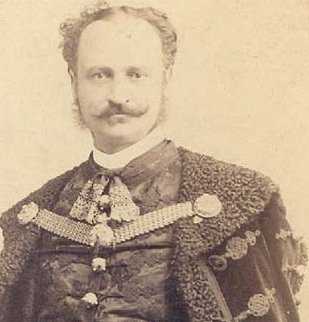

Minister of Religion and Education of Hungary
- In office 15 January 1895 – 3 November 1903
- Prime Minister: Dezső Bánffy; Kálmán Széll; Károly Khuen-Héderváry
- Preceded by: Loránd Eötvös
- Succeeded by: Albert Berzeviczy

Personal details
- Born: 17 March 1852 Zalaegerszeg, Kingdom of Hungary
- Died: 30 March 1937 (aged 85) Budapest, Kingdom of Hungary
- Party: Liberal Party, Constitution Party
- Profession: politician, jurist

Baron Gyula Wlassics de Zalánkemén (17 March 1852 – 30 March 1937) was a Hungarian politician, who served as Minister of Religion and Education between 1895 and 1903.

== Description ==
In December 1895 Wlassics passed a law that allowed women, among whom Sarolta Steinberger, to attend Eötvös Loránd University in Budapest to study medicine.

Wlassics favoured the free religious practice. He initiated the establishing of the museums' and the libraries' uniform organization with a national level. King Franz Joseph I awarded him with Iron Crown of Austria. He served as Speaker of the House of Magnates in 1918 and from 1927 to 1935. Wlassics was member of the Hungarian Academy of Sciences.

Political offices
Preceded by Loránd Eötvös	Minister of Religion and Education; 1895–1903	Succeeded by Albert Berzeviczy
Preceded by Endre Hadik-Barkóczy	Speaker of the House of Magnates; 1918	Succeeded by position abolished
Preceded by office reorganized	Speaker of the House of Magnates; 1927–1935	Succeeded by Bertalan Széchényi
