= Ioan Victor Stârcea =

Austro-Hungarian diplomat (1867–1944)

- Ioan Victor Stârcea in the 1930s

Austro-Hungarian Minister to Chile
- In office 11 November 1906 – 16 December 1912

Member of the Senate of Romania
- In office 1919–1920
- In office 1939–1940

Minister of State
- In office 2 May 1920 – 30 August 1920

Personal details
- Born: 9 February 1867 Czernowitz, Duchy of Bukovina, Austria-Hungary
- Died: 12 May 1944 (aged 77) Sibiu, Kingdom of Romania
- Citizenship: Austro-Hungarian (1867–1918); Romanian (1918–1944)
- Party: Democratic Union Party of Bukovina; People's Party; National Renaissance Front
- Spouse: Countess Bertha Carolina Amalia de Vismes et de Ponthieu (m. 1904; died 1937)
- Children: 3, including Victor Stârcea and Ioan Mocsonyi-Stârcea
- Parent(s): Victor Baron de Stârcea; Pulcheria de Petrino-Armis
- Education: Franz-Joseph University of Czernowitz
- Occupation: Jurist, diplomat, politician, courtier

Ioan Victor, Baron de Stârcea (also known as Johann Viktor Freiherr von Styrcea, occasionally spelled Stîrcea; 9 February 1867 – 12 May 1944) was an Austro-Hungarian diplomat, jurist, Romanian politician, and senior dignitary at the Royal Court of Romania.

A native of Bukovina from an ancient Moldavian boyar lineage elevated into the Austrian nobility, Stârcea served in the Imperial and Royal Foreign Ministry, representing Austria-Hungary as Envoy Extraordinary and Minister Plenipotentiary to Chile, Peru, and Bolivia between 1906 and 1912. Following the dissolution of the Habsburg monarchy in 1918, he supported the Bukovinian Romanian national movement, serving on the Romanian National Council and participating in the General Congress of Bukovina, which voted for the Union of Bukovina with Romania.

In Greater Romania, he was elected to the Senate in 1919 and briefly served as Minister of State for Bukovina in the second cabinet of Alexandru Averescu (1920). During the interwar era, he held the longstanding post of Grand Master of Ceremonies to the Royal Court under kings Ferdinand I and Carol II.

== Early life, family, and education ==
Ioan Victor de Stârcea was born in Czernowitz (Cernăuți), the capital of the Duchy of Bukovina, then a crown land of the Austrian Empire (now in Ukraine). He belonged to an old Moldavian boyar house whose historical lineage dates back to the Middle Ages; the family's Bukovinian branch had been integrated into the Austrian nobility with the title of Baron (Freiherr). His father was Victor Baron de Stârcea (1839–1908), a prominent Bukovinian landowner, deputy in the Austrian Imperial Council (Reichsrat), and a leading cultural and political figure among Bukovina's Romanian population. His mother was Pulcheria (also recorded as Polcheria) de Petrino-Armis. Through family kinship ties, Stârcea was related to other prominent Bukovinian boyar houses, including the Hurmuzaki and Zotta families.

Stârcea studied law at the Franz-Joseph University in Czernowitz, graduating with highest academic distinction. On 26 February 1891, he received imperial approval for promotion to Doctor of Law sub auspiciis imperatoris (under the patronage of Emperor Franz Joseph I), a rare academic honour reserved for candidates with flawless records throughout their secondary and higher education. The official doctoral investiture took place on 13 March 1891 in the university's main assembly hall in the presence of provincial authorities, with the ceremonial eulogy delivered by the Governor of the Duchy of Bukovina, Count Anton Pace von Friedensberg.

On 2 June 1904, Stârcea married Countess Bertha Carolina Amalia de Vismes et de Ponthieu (1886, Tangier – 25 January 1937, Bucharest), daughter of the diplomat Valery Guillaume de Vismes et de Ponthieu and Angela Fritsch de Minenfeld. The couple had three children:

- Victor Stârcea (born 30 March 1905, Constantinople), who pursued a career as a Romanian diplomat, notably serving at the Romanian legation in London;
- Ioan (Ionel) Stârcea (6 May 1909, Czernowitz – 1992), later adopted by Baron Anton Mocsonyi de Foen and known as Ioan Mocsonyi-Stârcea, who became Marshal of the Royal Court under King Michael I (1942–1944) and played an instrumental role in the royal coup of 23 August 1944;
- Ilinca Stârcea.

During the interwar period, it was alleged that Stârcea and Anton Mocsonyi had a homosexual relationship.

== Austro-Hungarian diplomatic career ==
Following his graduation in 1891, Stârcea entered the diplomatic corps of the Austro-Hungarian Ministry of Foreign Affairs in Vienna. From 1893 to 1894, he served as a legation attaché (Gesandtschaftsattaché) at the Austro-Hungarian diplomatic mission in Athens, Kingdom of Greece. He also received the title of imperial-royal chamberlain.

On 11 November 1906, Stârcea was appointed Envoy Extraordinary and Minister Plenipotentiary (außerordentlicher Gesandter und bevollmächtigter Minister) in Santiago, while concurrently serving as the Dual Monarchy's non-resident minister to Peru and Bolivia. He headed the legation in South America until 16 December 1912, when he was succeeded by Count Lőrinc Szapáry. He remained in the Austro-Hungarian foreign service until the collapse of the monarchy in 1918.

== Political career in Romania ==
=== Union of Bukovina (1918) ===
During the dissolution of Austria-Hungary toward the end of World War I, Stârcea returned to the political life of his native region, aligning himself with the Romanian national emancipation movement. By 25 November 1918, he was documented as an active member of the Romanian National Council of Bukovina, the political assembly chaired by Iancu Flondor.

On 28 November 1918, as an official member of the National Council, Stârcea participated in the General Congress of Bukovina held in the Synodal Hall of the Metropolitan Palace in Czernowitz, voting in favor of the declaration proclaiming the unconditional union of Bukovina with the Kingdom of Romania.

=== Parliamentary and governmental service ===
In the general elections of autumn 1919—the first held in Greater Romania under universal male suffrage – Stârcea ran on the list of the Democratic Union Party of Bukovina and was elected to the Senate of Romania for the Gura Humorului constituency, securing 2,872 votes; his mandate was validated in November 1919.

Following the resignation of historian Ion Nistor, Stârcea was appointed Minister of State for Bukovina in the second cabinet of General Alexandru Averescu on 2 May 1920, by Royal Decree No. 1,198. In this capacity, he was tasked with coordinating and accelerating the administrative, legal, and institutional unification between the former imperial province and the Old Kingdom. He held the ministerial portfolio until 30 August 1920.

=== Controversy with Iancu Flondor ===
Stârcea's appointment to the Averescu cabinet triggered a sharp political confrontation with Iancu Flondor, the former head of the Romanian National Council. Flondor openly condemned Stârcea's inclusion in the government, alleging financial misconduct and illicit interests regarding the commercial exploitation of forestry estates belonging to the Orthodox Church Fund of Bukovina. Flondor considered Stârcea's ministerial co-optation a major political blunder; in protest, he severed ties with the People's Party and permanently retired from active politics. Although the political polemic was intense and extensively documented at the time, Flondor's accusations never resulted in any legal conviction for Stârcea.

=== Dignitary of the Royal Court ===
Following the creation of Greater Romania, King Ferdinand I carried out an institutional overhaul of the Royal Court to integrate prominent figures from the newly attached provinces. While Banat nobleman Anton Mocsonyi was appointed Grand Master of the Royal Hunts, Stârcea was named Grand Master of Ceremonies of the Royal Court. The position, primarily protocolary and administrative around the monarch, was distinct from that of Marshal of the Royal Court; Stârcea managed official state visits, ceremonies, and royal audiences throughout the 1920s and 1930s.

Stârcea remained in office after the accession of King Carol II in 1930, continuing his duties despite the new monarch's gradual replacement of palace personnel. Press accounts documented Stârcea's active role in high-level diplomatic receptions (such as major state visits in 1934) and official royal ceremonies well into 1940.

During the late phase of Carol II's authoritarian royal regime, Stârcea was co-opted into the structures of the single-party system, serving as a member of the Superior Council of the National Renaissance Front between 1938 and 1940. In 1939, Carol II appointed him to the Romanian Senate as a senator by right in recognition of his past service as a cabinet minister.

Stârcea died on 12 May 1944 in Sibiu, at the age of 77.
