= Hungarian Court Chancellery =

The Hungarian Court Chancellery (Latin: Cancellaria Aulica Hungarica; German: ungarische Hofkanzlei; Hungarian: Magyar Udvari Kancellária) was an important institution in the Kingdom of Hungary's self-government under the Habsburg monarchy.

== History ==
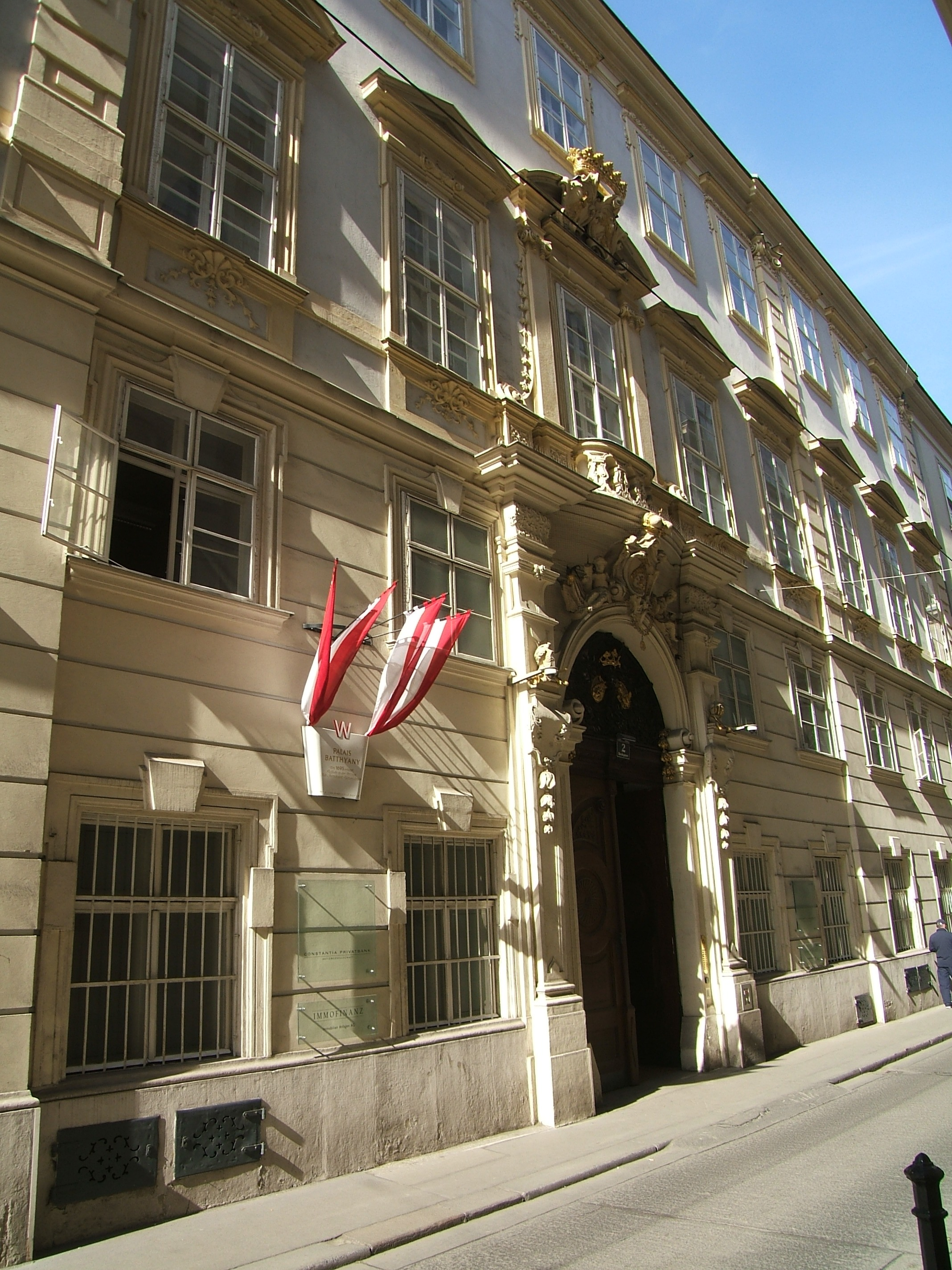
The Strattmann Palace in Vienna

After the defeat at the Battle of Mohács in 1526, the Kingdom of Hungary became an internal state of the Habsburg Empire. In the period between the 16th and 19th centuries, the Hungarian Court Chancellery, established by the Habsburg monarch, played an important role in Hungarian self-government, which was headquartered in Vienna. The affairs of the Austrian hereditary provinces and Bohemia were handled by two similar offices, the Austrian and Bohemian Court Chancelleries. From 1694, it became a sister institution of the Transylvanian Court Chancellery.

The primary task of the Court Chancellery was the exercise of the sovereign's rights, the granting of estates and various secular and ecclesiastical offices, the administration of ennoblements and other promotions, appointments, and contact with the various Hungarian government bodies. The direct connection with Hungary gave the Chancellery the opportunity to act as an intermediary between the monarch and the Hungarian estates. Thus, the chancellery and the chancellor became an indispensable factor in Hungarian estate politics.

=== Establishment ===
The Hungarian Court Chancellery was established by Ferdinand I in Pressburg (present-day Bratislava). During the reign of Rudolf II, it operated in Prague between 1576 and 1612, and then again in Pressburg. In 1690, it was transferred to Vienna, where it moved to Bankgasse 6 in 1747, in the former Strattmann Palace. This building was built in 1692–94, during the reign of Leopold I, according to the plans of Johann Bernhard Fischer von Erlach, originally for Count Theodor Heinrich von Strattmann (1637–1693), Imperial Court Chancellor, and in 1747 was purchased by Count Lipót Nádasdy, head of the Hungarian Court Chancellery, for himself and his office. The late Baroque façade of the palace was rebuilt in Rococo style betwee 1766 and 1767 based on designs by Nicolò Pacassi, and the building was expanded to include house number 4, whose façade was designed by Franz Anton Hillebrandt in a style matching that of house number 6. Since the dissolution of the Austro-Hungarian Monarchy, this building (Bankgasse 4-6) has housed the Hungarian Embassy in Vienna.

=== Hungarian Court Chancellors ===
Image	Name	Term Start	Term End	Notes
In 1526, Ferdinand I established the Hungarian Court Chancellery to manage Hungarian affairs.
	Tamás Szalaházi	1527	1536	
	Ferenc Újlaki	1539	1539	Bishop of Győr, Vice-Chancellor
	Péter Perényi	1541	1542?	
	Miklós Oláh	1543	1568	1543-1546: Vice-Chancellor 1546-1553: Chancellor 1553-1568: Chancellor Bishop of Eger, then Archbishop of Esztergom
	János Liszti	1568	1577	Bishop of Veszprém and then of Győr
	Juraj Drašković	1578	1586	Bishop of Győr, Archbishop of Kalocsa, Cardinal
	Péter Heresinczy	1586	1590	Bishop of Győr
	János Kutassy	1592	1597	Bishop of Győr
	Márton Pethe	1598	1602	Bishop of Győr
	Ferenc Forgách	1602	1607	Bishop of Nitra, then Archbishop of Esztergom
	Bálint Lépes	1608	1623	Bishop of Nitra
	István Sennyey	1623	1635	Bishop of Győr
	György Lippay	1635	1642	Bishop of Veszprém, then Archbishop of Esztergom
	István Bosnyák	1642	1644	Bishop of Veszprém
	György Szelepcsényi	1644	1666	Bishop of Nitra, then Archbishop of Esztergom
	Ferenc Lénárd Szegedi	1666	1669	Bishop of Vác
	Tamás Pálffy	1669	1679	Bishop of Vác, then of Nitra
	János Gubasóczy	1679	1686	Bishop of Nitra
	Péter Korompay	1686	1690	Bishop of Nitra
	Balázs Jaklin	1690	1695	Bishop of Tinin
	László Mattyasovszky	1696	1705	Bishop of Tinin
	Miklós Illésházy	1706	1723	
	László Ádám Erdődy	1725	1725	Bishop of Nitra
	Imre Esterházy	1725	1725	Bishop of Veszprém
	Ádám Péter Acsády	1725	1732	Bishop of Veszprém; the last Bishop-Chancellor
	Lajos Batthyány	1733	1746	
	Lipót Flórián Nádasdy	1746	1758	
	Miklós Pálffy	1758	1762	
	Ferenc Esterházy	1762	1785	
	Károly József Jeromos Pálffy	1787	1807	
	József Erdődy	1807	1819	
	Ferenc József Koháry	1820	1826	
	Mihály Nádasdy	1826	1827	
	Ádám Reviczky	1827	1836	
	Fidél Pálffy	1836	1838	
	Antal Mailáth	1839	1847	
	György Apponyi	1847	1848	
On 12 April 1848, the Batthyány government dissolved the Chancellery. It was replaced by the Ministry of the King's Personal Affairs. On 13 November 1848, Prince Windisch-Grätz, the military commander of Vienna, declared the ministry's operations to be terminated. 20 October 1860 – The October Diploma restored the previous office system
	Miklós Vay	1860	1861	
	Antal Forgách	1861	1864	
	Hermann Zichy	1864	1865	
	György Majláth	1865	1867	
On 17 February 1867, King Franz Joseph I of Hungary, in a letter addressed to Chancellor György Majláth, ordered the abolition of the Chancellery, and with the compromise the old court office finally gave way to a modern government. The officials and role of the Chancellery were taken over by the Ministry besides the King, headed by Count György Festetics.

== See also ==
- Imperial Court Chancellery
- Austrian Court Chancellery
- Bohemian Court Chancellery
- Transylvanian Court Chancellery

== Further information ==
- *Fazekas István: A Magyar Udvari Kancellária és hivatalnokai 1527–1690 között; ELKH BTK TTI, Budapest, 2021 (Magyar történelmi emlékek. Értekezések)
