= Emil Dessewffy =

Hungarian politician (1814–1866)

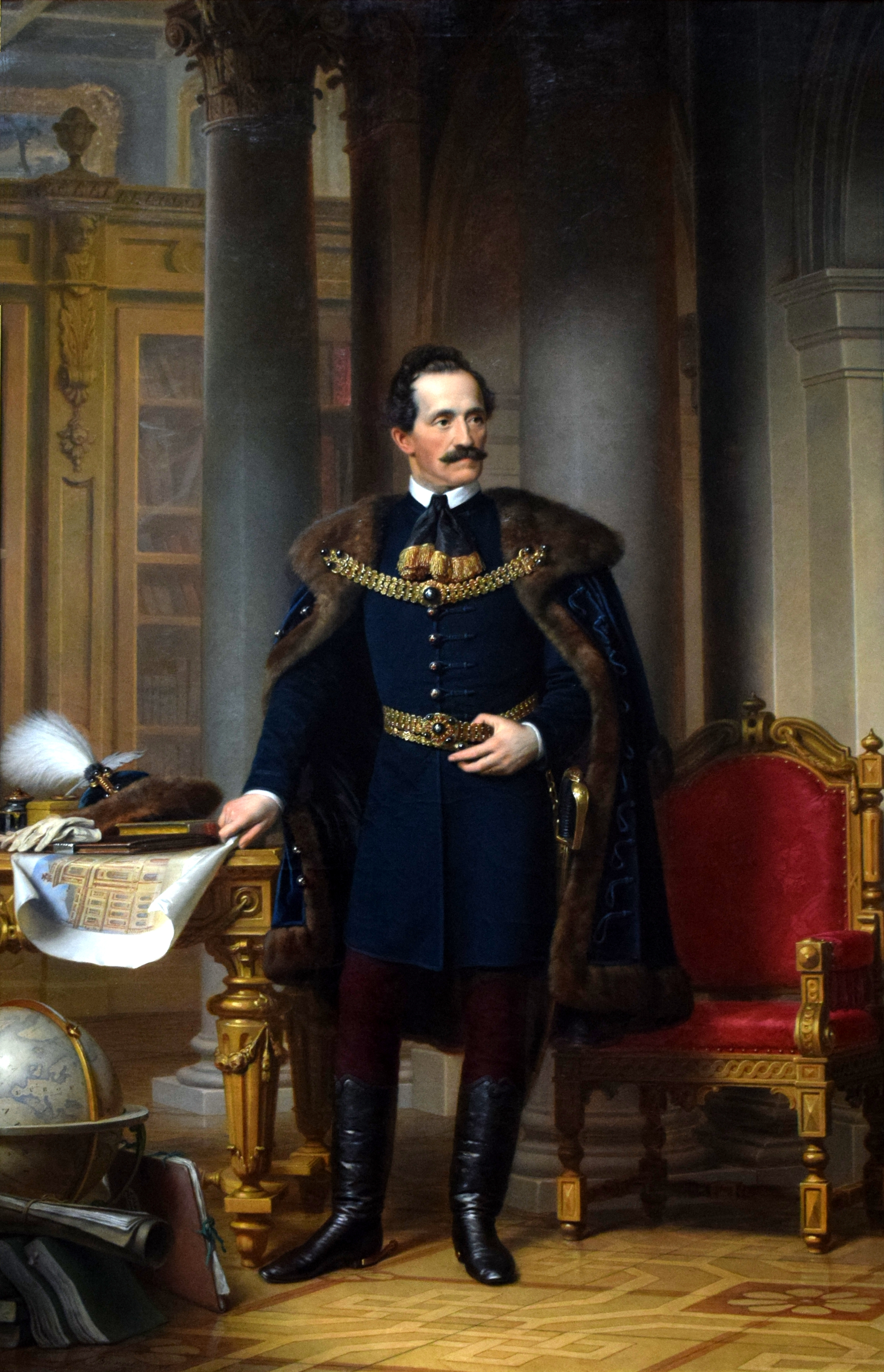
- His portrait by Miklós Barabás
- Born: Emil Dessewffy; 24 February 1814; Eperjes, Kingdom of Hungary (now: Prešov, Slovakia)
- Died: 10 January 1866 (aged 51); Pozsony, Kingdom of Hungary (now: Bratislava, Slovakia)
- Citizenship: Hungarian
- Known for: politician
- Political party: Conservative Party (1846-1849); Address Party (1861); Deák Party (1865-1866)

Count Emil Dessewffy de Csernek et Tarkeő (24 February 1814, Eperjes – 10 January 1866, Pozsony) was a Hungarian conservative politician, leader of the Conservative Party, who served as President of the Hungarian Academy of Sciences from 1855 until his death.

Cultural offices
Preceded by József Teleki	President of the Hungarian Academy of Sciences; 1855–1866	Succeeded by József Eötvös
