= Mamadou Samassa =

Mamadou Samassa may refer to the following Malian footballers:

- Mamadou Samassa (footballer, born 1986), forward for T–Team F.C. in Malaysia
- Mamadou Samassa (footballer, born 1990), goalkeeper for Troyes
