= Eleanor Perenyi =

American gardener and essayist

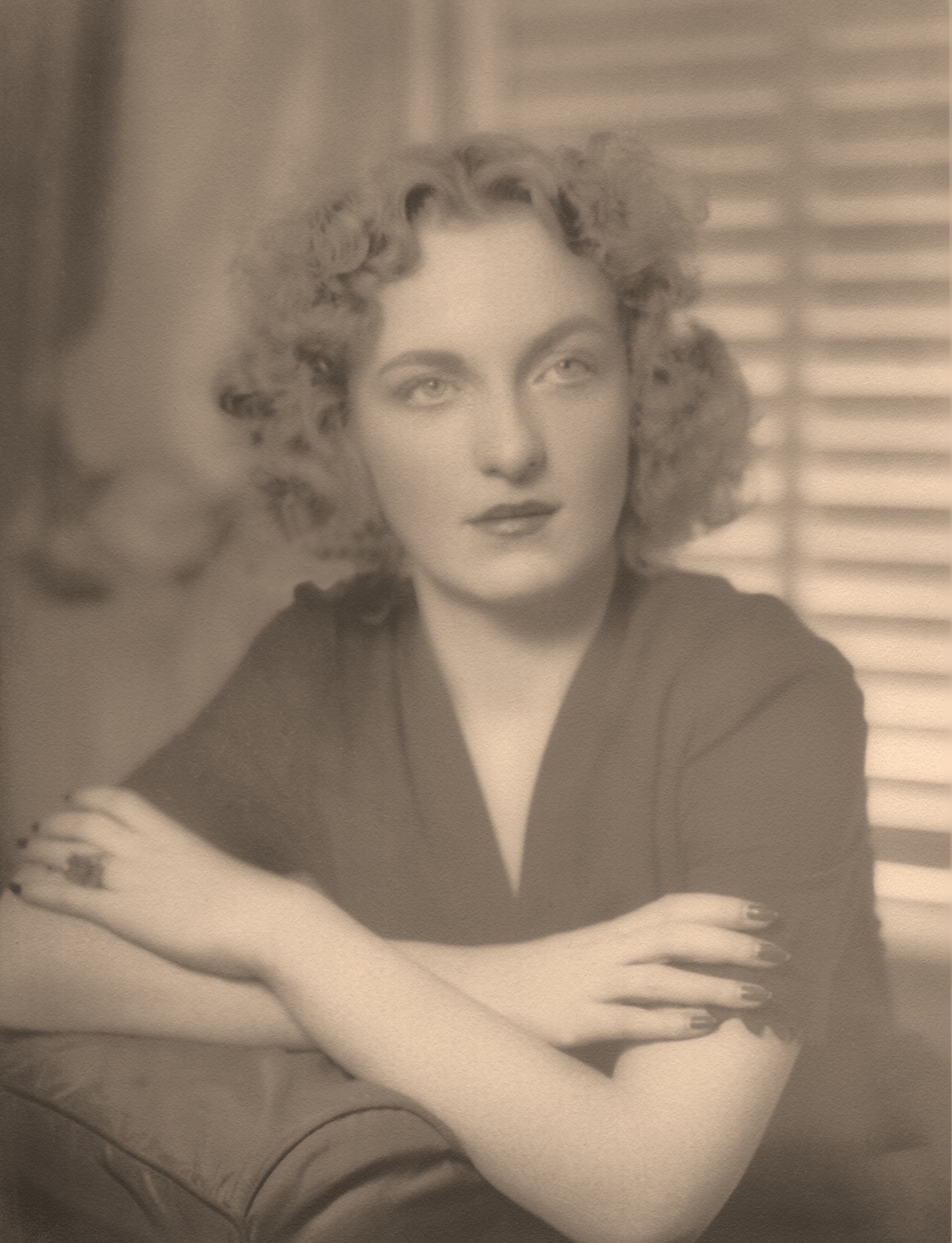
- Born: Eleanor Spencer Stone; January 4, 1918
- Died: May 3, 2009 (aged 91); Stonington
- Occupation: Author

Eleanor Spencer Stone Perényi (January 4, 1918 – May 3, 2009) was a gardener and author. She wrote several books including Green Thoughts, a collection of essays based on her own gardening experiences.

== Biography ==
Eleanor Perenyi was the daughter of a US Navy officer, Ellis S. Stone and Grace Zaring Stone. Grace Zaring Stone wrote her anti-Nazi novel Escape under the pseudonym Ethel Vance, for fear of jeopardizing the safety of her daughter, who was then living with her husband, the son of the Hungarian noble Baron Zsigmond Perényi, in pro-Fascist Hungary, then to be an ally of the Axis powers during World War II. At the onset of World War II, her husband was called up to serve in the Hungarian army. He persuaded Eleanor, then pregnant with their son, to return to the United States. She worked first as an editor at Harper's Bazaar and then as managing editor of Mademoiselle.

== Works ==
Perenyi is best known as the author of Green Thoughts: A Writer in the Garden, which drew on her work on her husband's rural estate near the present-day town of Vynohradiv, Ukraine (the former Nagyszőlős, Hungary). Her life there is further recorded in her 1946 memoir More Was Lost, which describes her marriage to her Hungarian noble husband and the impact of World War II on life in rural Hungary. Her other books include the Civil War novel The Bright Sword (1955) and a study of Franz Liszt titled Liszt: The Artist as Romantic Hero (1974), which was nominated for a National Book Award.

Green Thoughts was reviewed by Brooke Astor in The New York Times.

More Was Lost was reprinted by New York Review of Books Press in 2016 with an introduction by the poet J.D. McClatchy and is reviewed by Sadie Stein in The Paris Review.

== Award ==
Perenyi was given an award in literature from the American Academy of Arts and Letters in 1982.
