= Adolf Samassa =

Hungarian politician

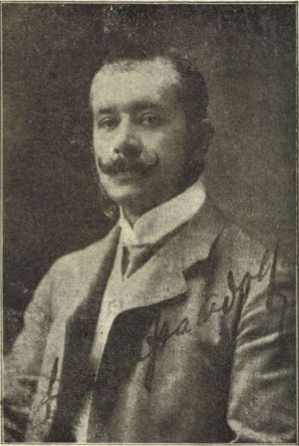

Minister of the Interior of Hungary
- In office 7 August 1919 – 15 August 1919
- Preceded by: Károly Peyer
- Succeeded by: Zsigmond Perényi

Personal details
- Born: 13 April 1867 Aranyosmarót, Austria-Hungary
- Died: 31 January 1929 (aged 61) Budapest, Hungary
- Party: Independent
- Profession: politician

Adolf Samassa de Gesztőcz (13 April 1867, Zlaté Moravce – 31 January 1929) was a Hungarian politician, who served as Interior Minister for few days in 1919.

Political offices
Preceded by Károly Peyer	Minister of the Interior; 1919	Succeeded by Zsigmond Perényi
