= György Mailáth (1818–1883) =

Hungarian politician

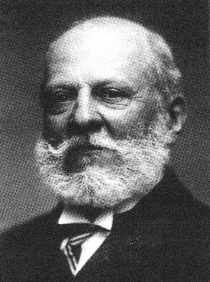

Speaker of the House of Magnates
- In office 22 March 1867 – 29 March 1883
- Preceded by: Pál Sennyey
- Succeeded by: László Szőgyény-Marich

Personal details
- Born: 7 December 1818 Pozsony, Kingdom of Hungary, Austrian Empire (now Bratislava, Slovakia)
- Died: 29 March 1883 (aged 64) Budapest, Austria-Hungary
- Party: Conservative Party
- Spouse: Stefánia Prandau-Hilleprand
- Children: Etelka; György; Sarolta; József; István; László; Gusztáv
- Profession: politician

György Mailáth (7 December 1818 – 29 March 1883), also known by his German name Georg von Mailáth, was a Hungarian politician.

Mailáth was born in Pressburg (Pozsony), Kingdom of Hungary (today Bratislava, Slovakia), to György Mailáth, also a Hungarian politician. He entered the civil service of the county of Baranya, of which he was deputy from 1839 to 1843. The legislature appointed him administrator of the county in 1843, and county head in 1848. However he withdrew to private life during the Hungarian Revolution of 1848.

He reentered politics a decade later, playing a large part from 1859 in a strengthened legislature. In 1866 he became Chancellor of Hungary, and later the judex curiae (judge royal) of Hungary. He was Speaker of the Diet of Hungary from 22 March 1867 until his death on 29 March 1883. He was killed during a robbery in 1883.

Political offices
Preceded by György Andrássy	Judge royal 1867–1883	Succeeded by Pál Sennyey
Preceded by Pál Sennyey	Speaker of the House of Magnates; 1867–1883	Succeeded by László Szőgyény-Marich
