= Charlotte von Majláth =

Austrian court official

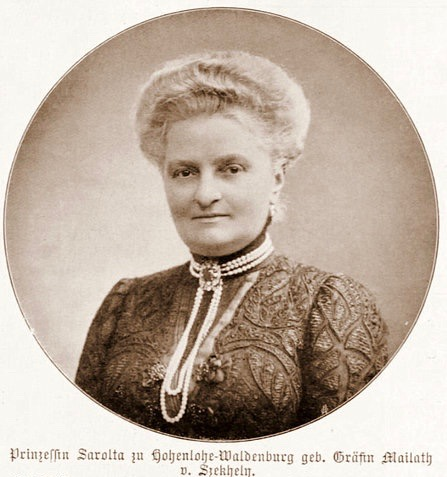
Charlotte von Majláth

Charlotte von Majláth (1856–1928), was a court official in Austria-Hungary.

She was the lady-in-waiting to Empress Elisabeth of Austria. She was a favorite and confidant of the empress.
