= Albin Csáky =

Hungarian politician

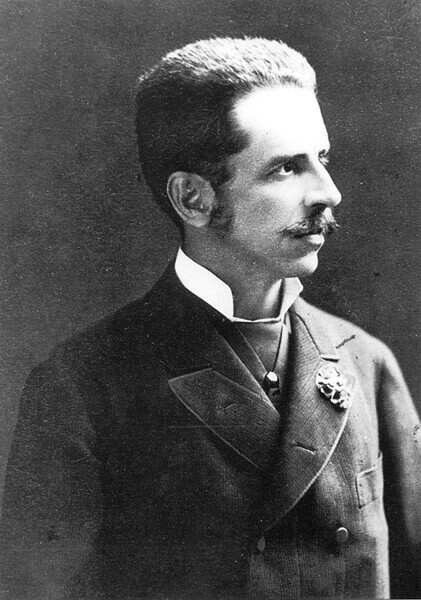
- Photograph by Károly Koller

Minister of Religion and Education of Hungary
- In office 22 September 1888 – 10 June 1894
- Preceded by: Gábor Baross
- Succeeded by: Loránd Eötvös

Personal details
- Born: 19 April 1841 Korompa, Kingdom of Hungary
- Died: 15 December 1912 (aged 71) Budapest, Austria-Hungary
- Party: Liberal Party (1887-1898, 1899-1906); National Party of Work (1906-1912)
- Spouse: Anna Bolza
- Children: István; Mária; László; Eleonóra; Károly; Ilona; Imre
- Profession: politician

Count Albin Csáky de Körösszeg et Adorján (19 April 1841 – 15 December 1912) was a Hungarian politician, who served as Minister of Religion and Education between 1888 and 1894. He finished his secondary school studies in Lőcse, then he learnt in Kassa. He became representative of the Diet of Hungary in 1862. 1900–1906 and 1910–1912 he served as Speaker of the House of Magnates.

== Early life ==
Born into a prominent Hungarian noble family, Albin Csáky was the second son of Count Ágost Csáky de Körösszeg et Adorján (1803–1883) and his wife, Baroness Iphigenia Prónay de Tótpróna et Blatnicza (1807-1874).

== Career ==
As minister for religion and education in 1890, Csáky introduced an ordinance to enforce the existing mixed-marriage laws, which stipulated that children of mixed marriages should be baptised in the faith corresponding to the parent of the same sex. The Catholic Church had been regularly defying these laws, and Csáky hoped to bring an end to this, but his actions provoked a strong hostile reaction from the Church.

== Family ==
On 24 September 1866 in Szarvas, he was married to Countess Anna Bolza (1847-1925), daughter of Count István Bolza (1817-1880) and his wife, Countess Alojzia Vay de Vaja et Luskod (1824-1849). They had six children:

- István Csáky (1867–1892): studied law, he served as representative in Szarvas. He committed suicide because he believed that the illness from which he was suffering was incurable.
- Mária Albina Csáky (1868–1912): wife of Baron Andor Harkányi de Takta-Harkány (1862-1923)
- László Csáky (1869–1909): ispan of Szepes County and Ugocsa County, his wife was Countess Augusta von Degenfeld-Schönburg (1877-1965)
- Eleonóra Csáky (1870–1945): wife of László Hertelendy de Hertelend et Vindornyalak (1866-1912)
- Károly Csáky (1873–1945): served as Minister of Defence of Hungary, married three times: Valéria Földváry de Földvár et Bernátfalva (1872-1964), Erzsébet Ordódy de Ordód et Alsólieszkó (1885-1969), Anna Hilda Schiro (1899-1959).
- Ilona Csáky (1878–1934): wife of Baron Otto Friedrich Benz von Albkron (1870-1923)
- Imre Csáky (1882–1961): served as Minister of Foreign Affairs of Hungary, his wife was Countess Mária Annunziáta Sztáray de Sztára et Nagymihály (1899-1969). He died in the Canary Islands.

Political offices
Preceded by Gábor Baross	Minister of Religion and Education; 1888–1894	Succeeded by Loránd Eötvös
Preceded by Tibor Károlyi	Speaker of the House of Magnates; 1900–1906	Succeeded by Aurél Dessewffy
Preceded by Aurél Dessewffy	Speaker of the House of Magnates; 1910–1912	Succeeded by Sámuel Jósika
