= Tibor Károlyi (politician) =

Hungarian politician

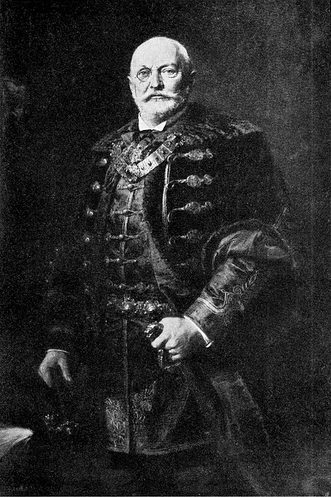

Speaker of the House of Magnates
- In office 17 June 1898 – 2 October 1900
- Preceded by: Vilmos Tóth
- Succeeded by: Albin Csáky

Personal details
- Born: 26 September 1843 Pozsony, Kingdom of Hungary (today: Bratislava, Slovakia)
- Died: 5 April 1904 (aged 60) Abbázia, Austria-Hungary (today: Opatija, Croatia)
- Profession: politician

Count Tibor Károlyi de Nagykároly (26 September 1843 – 5 April 1904) was a Hungarian politician, who served as Speaker of the House of Magnates between 1898 and 1900.

== Biography ==
He was born in Pozsony into an old noble family on 26 September 1843. His parents were Count György Károlyi, Lord Lieutenant, a key figure of the reform age, Oldest Member of the House of Magnates, member of the Hungarian Academy of Sciences (MTA); and Countess Karolina Zichy, daughter of Count Károly Zichy and sister of Countess Antónia Zichy, who married Prime Minister Lajos Batthyány. Tibor Károlyi had several siblings, István (Member of Parliament), Gábor, Gyula (Imperial and Royal Chamberlain, MP and member of the House of Magnates). His sister, Pálma married to Aurél Dessewffy who later served as Speaker of the House of Magnates. Tibor married Countess Emma Degenfeld-Schonburg, they had five children, including Gyula who later became Prime Minister of Hungary, Antal, Imperial and Royal Chamberlain, and Imre, who functioned as Knight of Malta. Tibor Károlyi was uncle and guardian of Mihály Károlyi, President of the First Hungarian Republic.

At the age of 20, along with his brothers he traveled Spain and Africa. He joined Hungarian Legion in the Austro-Prussian War in 1866, became aide-de-camp of György Klapka. After dissolution of the legion moved to Paris. He returned to home only in 1867.

He was a member of the House of Representatives from 1875 to 1884 as a representative of the governing Liberal Party. He was a Member of Parliament for Orosháza (1875-1881), then for Pécska (1881-1884). He promoted to a heritage member of the House Of Magnates. He became second Deputy Speaker on 10 October 1888. Then he served as first Deputy Speaker from 16 September 1894. He was awarded Privy Councillor in 1898. He was appointed Speaker of the Upper House on 17 June 1898 when his predecessor Vilmos Tóth died in office. He resigned in 1900.

Károlyi also dealt with fine arts and economy besides politics. He translated Edgar Quinet's work, named Histoire de la campagne de 1815 about the French Revolution as well as a book about Eighty Years' War by John Lothrop Motley. He also published Archives of Károlyi family in five volumes.

He participated in the significant water control operations, whereby he was chairman of the companies which carried out discharge of Tisza, Maros, Körös, Szamos rivers, regulation of Nyírvíz and draining of Ecsed Marsh.

His social work also undertaken; became chairman of the Hungarian Fine Arts Society, following Arnold Ipolyi in that position. He also served as President of the Smallholders' Credit Institution, as well as Chairman of the Board of the Adria Shipping Company. Tibor Károlyi died in 1904.

Political offices
Preceded by Vilmos Tóth	Speaker of the House of Magnates; 1898–1900	Succeeded by Albin Csáky
