= Conservative Party (Hungary) =

19th-century political party in Hungary

Conservative Party Konzervatív Párt
- Historical leaders: Emil Dessewffy
- Founded: 12 November 1846
- Dissolved: 1849
- Succeeded by: Opposition Party
- Headquarters: Pest, Hungary, Austrian Empire
- Newspaper: "Világ" "Budapesti Híradó"
- Ideology: Conservatism
- Political position: Right-wing
- Colours: Blue

The Conservative Party (Hungarian: Konzervatív Párt, pronounced [ˈkonzɛrvɒtiːv ˈpaːrt]) was one of the most influential political groups of the National Assembly of the 1840s in Hungary. The group was led by Emil Dessewffy. In 1849, after long debates, the Conservatives temporarily set aside their differences with their greatest political opponent, the left-wing Opposition Party, and united for the duration of the war to demonstrate national unity to Hungarian society. The reason: Hungary faced immense military and political pressure when it became clear that it had to fight not only against the armies of the Habsburgs but also against the forces of the Russian Tsar.

== History ==
The Conservative Party was formed on 12 November 1846 by Habsburg-loyal, "considering progressive" thinking young conservative aristocrats. It was the first political party by today's terms in the history of Hungary. The party wanted to achieve Hungary's interests within the empire and seen the country's interest to preserve a strong Habsburg Realm. Unlike the liberal opposition they did not want to confront with Vienna. They wanted to comply the interests of Hungary with the interests of the whole empire.

They kept in mind the interests of the aristocracy, but unlikely the "old conservatives" they did not want to maintain feudalism and the constitution of the orders, because they recognized its crisis. They supported a slow and partial extension of full citizen rights to the people. The leader of the "considering progressive" politicians was Aurél Dessewffy, but after his death his younger brother Emil Dessewffy took over the role. (At the time of the establishment of the party Aurél was already dead.) Emil tried to persuade Chancellor Metternich to understand that it is also in Vienna's interests to introduce new moderate reforms, to hold back the reform opposition in the National Assembly. They supported the administer system.

During the Revolution of 1848 the party moved closer to the Opposition Party. The party's social organisation, the Közhasznú Gyülde (Public Benefit Meeting) united with the social organisation of the liberals. In Pál Esterházy they gave in the first Hungarian government the Minister besides the King of Hungary. In 1849 the party merged into the Opposition Party.

== Political program ==
- Unchanged maintenance of public law with Austria, based on the Sanctio Pragmatica (maintenance of the area council institutions)
- Customs union with Cisleithania
- Election of representatives to the National Assembly and to the local authorities, based on popular representation, with high census
- Restricted freedom of press, religion and speech
- Redesigning of the Hungarian cities according to modern needs
- Centralized public administration (with slow, organized, from above directed reforms)
- Burden sharing
- Investments in the infrastructure
- Peasant question, maintenance of voluntary perpetuation
- Tolerance with the nationalities

== Critics ==
The official opinions are contradictive about the Conservative Party. Although they were reformists and stood against Vienna's absolutistic pursuits, they were the number one opponents of the Opposition Party. They are often referred to as the "ruling party" opposite of the Opposition Party. According to the latter liberal historiography they were Vienna's puppets, who proposed modest reforms, in favor of quietening the reformist mood. Others said that they wanted to achieve just the aims they stated in their party program, an aristoctatic-led society with a reformed structure. About the Conservative Party later sympathizer (like Gyula Szekfű, or today's Hungarian conservative press) says that they wanted the same as the reform opposition, but slower and they avoided the direct confrontation with Vienna like István Széchenyi. They were afraid of the centralization of the empire and the germanization.

== List of notable members of the Conservative Party ==
- Emil Dessewffy, leader of the party, president of the Hungarian Academy of Sciences
- György Apponyi, Lord Chancellor of Hungary, Speaker of the House of Magnates
- Pál Esterházy, Minister besides the King of Hungary
- György Andrássy
