= Althann =

Name of an ancient family from Lower Bavaria

Coat of Arms of the House of Atlhann

The House of Althann (also spelled Althan, Altham or Altheim) is an ancient German noble family that originated in Lower Bavaria, whose members occupied many important political and clerical positions during the Holy Roman Empire. From 1714, they held the position of hereditary Cup-bearers for the Holy Roman Emperor.

== History ==
They are one of the oldest extant German noble families, going back to at least 1129. By 1400, they had moved to Austria, where they were created barons, in 1574, and Imperial Counts, in 1610. After Brandenberg-Prussia annexed Silesia in the First Silesian War, a branch of the family joined the Prussian nobility. In the nineteenth century, they had seats in both the Austrian and Prussian Herrenhauser, or House of Lords.

A list of notable members and possessions of the family may be found in the corresponding German Wikipedia article.

== Bibliography ==
- Wilhelm Hauser, Das Geschlecht derer von Althann. Dissertation: Vienna, 1949.
- Joseph Kögler, Die Chroniken der Grafschaft Glatz. Neu bearbeitet von Dieter Pohl, (Köln, 1992ff): Volume 2: 257–259; Volume 4: 220–225.
