= Zsigmond Perényi (1870–1946) =

Hungarian politician

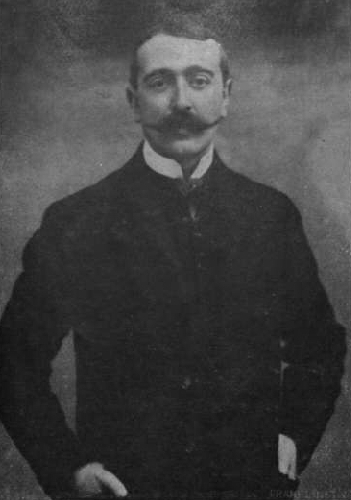

Minister of the Interior of Hungary
- In office 15 August 1919 – 27 August 1919
- Preceded by: Adolf Samassa
- Succeeded by: István Friedrich

Regent's Commissioner of the Governorate of Subcarpathia
- In office 28 June 1939 – 12 September 1940
- Preceded by: position established
- Succeeded by: Miklós Kozma

Personal details
- Born: 25 November 1870 Pest, Austria-Hungary
- Died: 18 March 1946 (aged 75) Budapest, Hungary
- Party: National Party of Work, Unity Party, Party of Hungarian Life
- Spouse: Etelka Cseh de Szentkatolna
- Children: Zsigmond Perényi de Perény
- Profession: politician

Baron Zsigmond Perényi de Perény (25 November 1870 – 18 March 1946) was a Hungarian politician, who served as Interior Minister in 1919.

== Early life ==
He was the son of Baron Zsigmond Lipót Perényi de Perény (1843–1915) and Baroness Petronella Mária Perényi de Perény (1845–1914). His sister, Baroness Gabriella Perényi de Perény, was the wife of Count August of Salm-Reifferscheidt-Raitz (a grandson of Hugo, 2nd Prince of Salm-Reifferscheidt-Raitz, through his youngest son Count Erich of Salm-Reifferscheidt-Raitz).

== Career ==
During the Hungarian Soviet Republic, he was arrested by the communists. He was the governor of the Governorate of Subcarpathia (Kárpátaljai Kormányzóság) between 28 June 1939 and 12 September 1940. As Crown Guard, he was a member of the House of Magnates, later Speaker of this assembly. In 1944, he resigned because of the appointment of the cabinet of Ferenc Szálasi's Hungarist Arrow Cross Party).

== Personal life ==
He was married to Etelka Cseh de Szentkatolna (1872–1947), a daughter of János Cseh de Szentkatolna and Valéria Szuhányi de Hirip et Ivácskó. From her earlier marriage to Aladár Ráthonyi de Adorján, she was the mother of György Ráthonyi de Adorján. Together, Zsigmond and Etelka were the parents of:

- Baron Zsigmond Perényi de Perény (1901–1965), who married American writer Eleanor Spence Stone, a daughter of Commodore Ellis Spencer Stone and Grace Zaring Stone. They divorced and he married Teréz Alexander, a daughter of Simon Alexander.

Baron Perényi died on 18 March 1946 at Budapest, Hungary.

Political offices
Preceded by Adolf Samassa	Minister of the Interior; 1919	Succeeded by István Friedrich
Preceded by none	Regent's Commissioner of Subcarpathia; 1939–1940	Succeeded by Miklós Kozma
Preceded by Bertalan Széchényi	Speaker of the House of Magnates; 1943–1944	Succeeded by Jenő Rátz
