= György Mailáth (1786–1861) =

Hungarian statesman

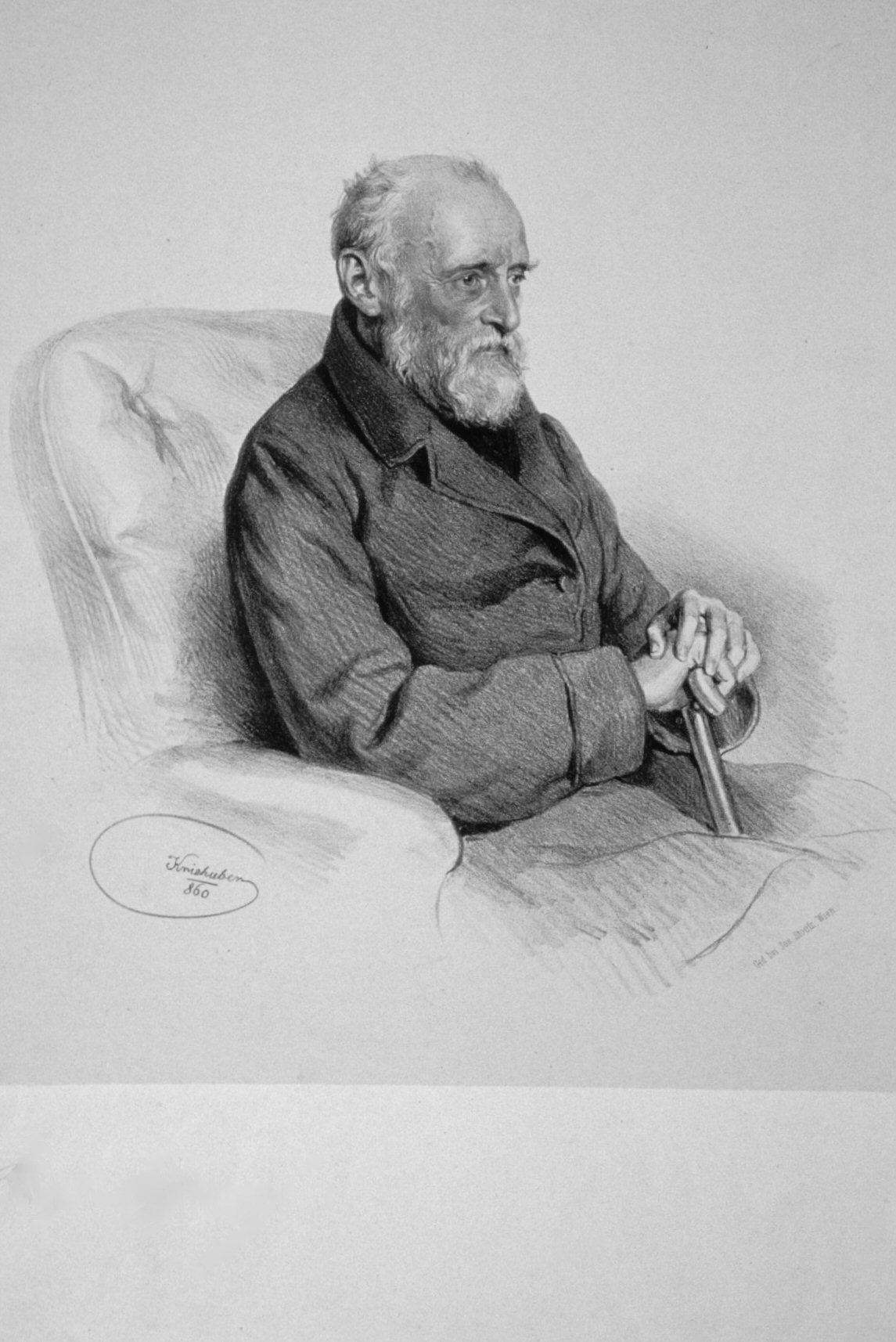

Speaker of the House of Magnates
- In office 25 June 1848 – 31 December 1848
- Preceded by: office established
- Succeeded by: Zsigmond Perényi

Personal details
- Born: 22 April 1786 Zavar, Kingdom of Hungary
- Died: 11 April 1861 (aged 74) Vienna, Austrian Empire
- Spouse: Karolina Uzovics de Petőfalva
- Children: György
- Profession: politician

György Mailáth (April 2, 1786 – April 11, 1861), also known by his German name Georg von Mailáth, was a Hungarian statesman.

Mailáth was born in Zavar, Pozsony county, Kingdom of Hungary (today in Slovakia). He entered politics in his early 30s, and was appointed to a series of positions. In 1817 he became deputy head of Pozsony county; in 1819, second commissioner for Transylvania; in 1821 a member of the Governor's Council (Helytartótanács); and in 1822 prothonotary to the royal court. From 1832 to 1839 he worked as Staatsrat in Vienna, and in 1839 was appointed judge royal (országbíró) of Hungary. Around the time of the Hungarian Revolution of 1848, he became president of the upper house of the National Assembly in Pest, but resigned shortly thereafter. He died in 1861 in Vienna.

His son, also named György Mailáth, was also active in Hungarian politics.

Political offices
| Preceded by Zsigmond Szőgyény | Chief justice 1825–1831 | Succeeded by Sándor Mérey |
| Preceded by Antal Cziráky | Judge royal 1839–1848 | Succeeded by György Apponyi |
| Preceded by office established | Speaker of the House of Magnates; 1848 | Succeeded by Zsigmond Perényi |
