= 1861 Hungarian parliamentary election =

- 1 March – 7 April 1861

All 332 seats in the Diet 167 seats needed for a majority
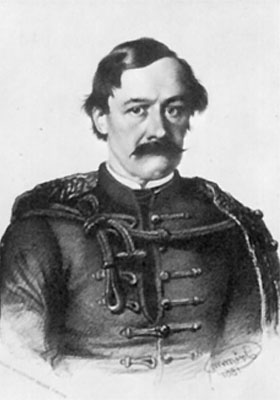

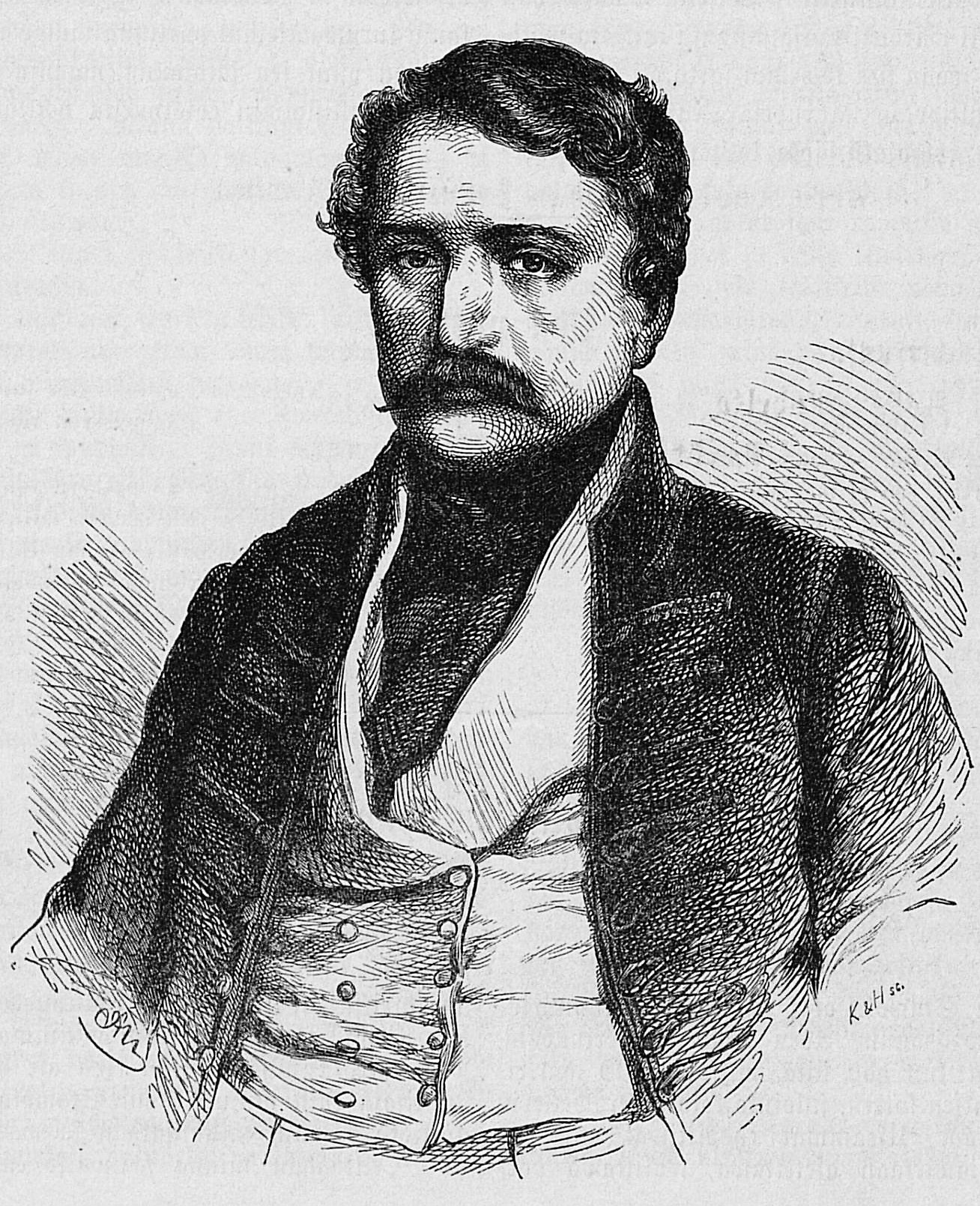
	First party	Second party
Leader	László Teleki	Ferenc Deák
Party	HP	FP
Seats won	170 / 332	160 / 332
Seat change	New	New
Percentage	51.21%	48.19%

Parliamentary elections were held in Hungary in 1861. Austrian Empire was defeated in the war with France and lost Lombardy in 1859. Franz Joseph I tried to divert attention from the defeat by supervising the operation of Protestant denominations (Protestantenpatent), but due to resistance led by Baron Miklós Vay, he withdrew it. The emperor established an imperial council in 1860, to which the assemblies of the crown lands would also have delegated members, but the provincial assemblies could not be established, so the emperor dissolved the council. Of those invited to the imperial council, Baron Miklós Vay and Pál Somssich also refused to participate. As a result of negotiations with Hungarian conservatives, Franz Joseph I issued the October Diploma, which established another imperial council, the members of which were delegated by the diets. The diploma allowed a return to the conditions of 1847, as part of which the Voivodeship of Serbia and Banat of Temeschwar were abolished. The governor became Count György Majláth, the court chancellor became Baron Miklós Vay, and the minister responsible for Hungarian affairs became Count Antal Szécsen in the imperial government. However, the counties turned against the restored Hungarian authorities. Franz Joseph I convened the Hungarian Parliament based on Act V of 1848. After the counties sabotaged tax collection, the monarch amended the October Diploma (February Patent) in 1861, with which he established the two-chamber imperial assembly. Baron Miklós Vay refused to sign the patent. The National Judicial Conference convened by the judge royal, Count György Apponyi, adopted the Temporary Legislative Regulations, which were submitted to the National Assembly. At the ethincal minority gatherings, they demanded an ethnical border-based administration and equal rights. Neither Slavonia, nor Croatia, nor Transylvania, nor Fiume were represented in the National Assembly, but the Țara Chioarului (Kővárvidék) was represented. The venue of the National Assembly was Pest, but the ceremonial opening took place in the Buda Castle, which was boycotted by the majority of the representatives on 6 April, 1861.

== Parties and leaders ==
In the election didn't participate parties, all of these parties formed after the election.

Party	Leader
Resolution Party (HP)	László Teleki
Address Party (FP)	Ferenc Deák

== Electoral system ==
The elections were based on property, income and education census. Landowners with a ¼ plot of land (between 2.5 – 6.5 ha) or with 100 Ft income, merchants with their own businesses, craftsmen masters and factory owners. In the Royal free cities houses or landowners worth 300 Fts and the citizens. 20 years older men were eligible to vote and 24 years older men could be elected. Women had no right for the participation. The elections were held exclusively in single-member district by open voting.

== Results ==
Party	Seats	+/–
Resolution Party	170	New
Address Party	160	New
Independent moderate	1	New
Independent Slovaks	1	New
Total	332	–
Source: Ballabás-Pap-Pál

The group of independents are classified by their political position as moderate opposition or ethnic minority.

== The activity of the parliament ==
The monarch convened the National Assembly to accept the October Diploma and the February Patent, elect the envoys to the imperial assembly and crown him as King of Hungary. However the representatives rejected the monarch's demands, the jurisdiction of the imperial assembly and the imperial government. Ferenc Deák formulated a proposal, in which he advocated a personal union, considering only foreign affairs to be common. He demanded the recognition of the April Laws, and the election of representatives from Transylvania, Croatia, Slavonia and Fiume. Two groups formed in connection with the proposal, the '48ers led by Ferenc Deák would have sent the proposal to the monarch in the traditional way, as a proposal, and the Address Party was formed from them. However, the '49ers led by Count László Teleki did not recognize the legitimacy of Franz Joseph I, so they wanted to declare it in the form of a parliamentary resolution. The Resolution Party hoped that the military alliance with Kingdom of Italy, formed by Hungarian emigrants, would spark another war for the Hungarian independence. After the death of Count Camillo Benso, the Hungarian issue was no longer treated as a priority, so Count László Teleki, realizing the failure of his policy and committed suicide. The Resolution Party then also voted for the proposal, and the Temporary Legislative Rules were adopted. Bills were drafted in the parliamentary committees regarding the nationality issue and Jewish emancipation, which were no longer discussed.

== Aftermath ==
Since the Parliament had rejected the emperor's demands, he dissolved the body on August 22. He replaced the court chancellor, the lord lieutenant, and the minister responsible for Hungarian affairs. The counties protested against the dissolution of the parliament, so the emperor suspended their operations on November 5 and he govern the country by decrees.
