= Hungarian State =

1849 unrecognised state in Central Europe

Coordinates: 47°31′N 21°38′E

Hungarian State Magyar Állam (Hungarian)
- 1849
- Flag Coat of arms
- Anthem: "Himnusz" (Hungarian) (English: "Hymn")
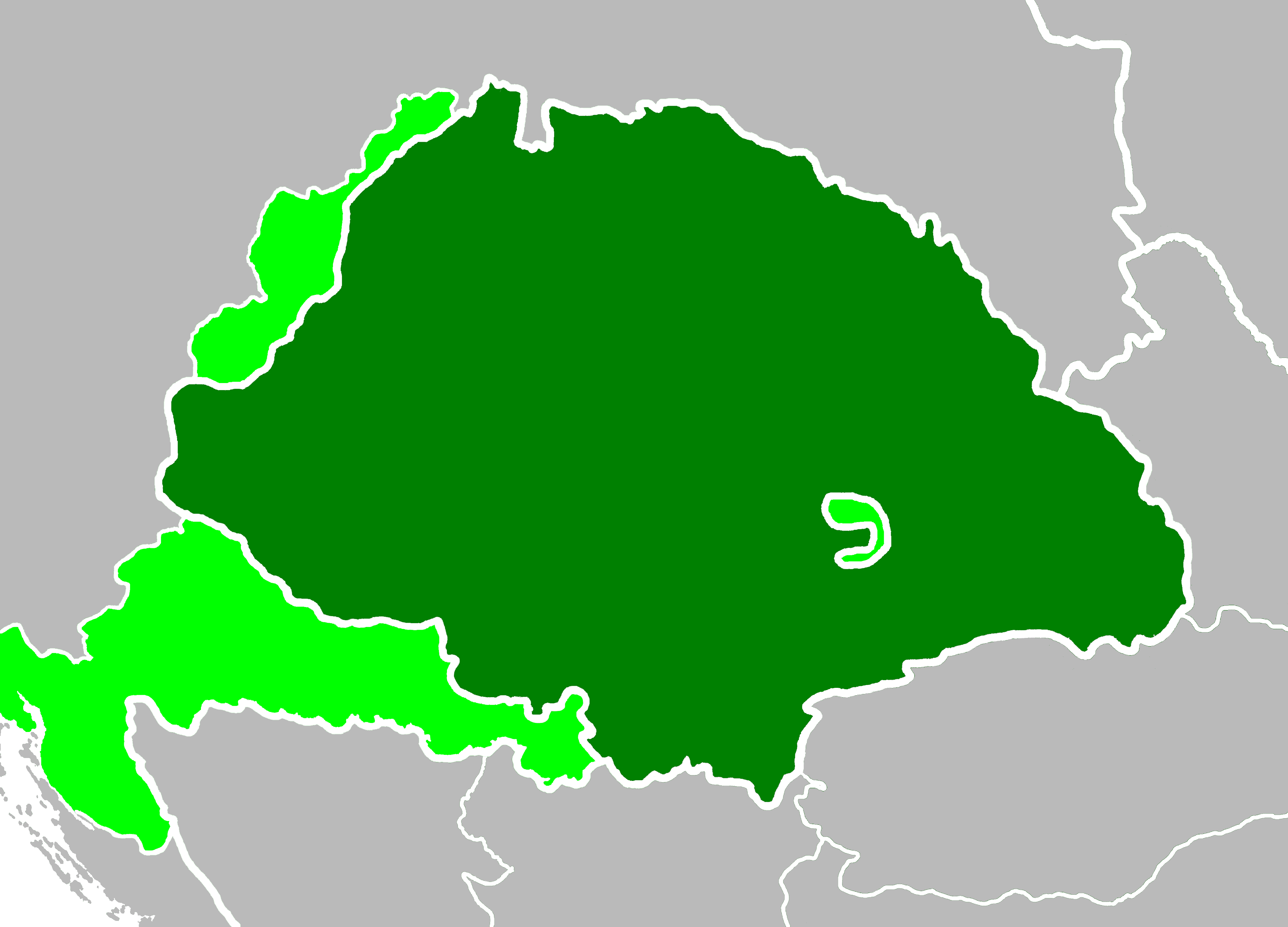
- A map of the revolutionary Hungarian State before the Austro-Russian counteroffensive; controlled territory in dark green and claimed but un-administered territory in light green
- Status: Unrecognised state
- Capital: Buda
- Capital-in-exile: Debrecen, Szeged, Arad
- Common languages: Hungarian (official); German; Romanian; Slovak; Croatian; Slovene; Serbian; Italian; Ruthenian
- Religion: Roman Catholicism; Calvinism; Lutheranism; Eastern Orthodoxy; Eastern Catholicism; Unitarianism; Judaism
- Demonym: Hungarian
- Government: Revolutionary provisional government^{^{a}}
- Governor-President of Hungary
  - 14 April 1849 – 11 August 1849: Lajos Kossuth
  - 11 August 1849 – 13 August 1849: Artúr Görgey^{^{b}}
- Prime Minister
  - 2 May 1849 – 11 August 1849: Bertalan Szemere
- Legislature: Diet
- Historical era: Revolutions of 1848
  - Established: 14 April 1849
  - Military collapse: 13 August 1849

Area
  - Total: 282,870 km^{2} (109,220 sq mi) (Kingdom of Hungary)

Population
  - c. 1840 estimate: 12,880,406 (Kingdom of Hungary)
- Currency: Krajcár
Preceded by	Succeeded by
Kingdom of Hungary (1526–1867)	Kingdom of Hungary (1526–1867)
- Today part of: Hungary
- 1. In order to avoid tensions between monarchist and republican factions, the form of government was to be decided later.; 2. as dictator

The Hungarian State (Hungarian: Magyar Állam, archaically Magyar Álladalom) was a short-lived unrecognised state that existed for 4 months in the last phase of the Hungarian Revolution of 1848–49.

== Constitutional tensions between the Hungarian parliament and Franz Joseph ==
On 2 December 1848 Ferdinand V of Hungary "abdicated" in favour of his nephew Francis Joseph. The Hungarian reform laws (April laws) were based on the 12 points that established the fundaments of modern civil and political rights, economic and societal reforms in the Kingdom of Hungary. Franz Joseph refused to accept the reforms of the Hungarian April laws. Franz Joseph also arbitrarily "revoked" the laws. This was an unconstitutional deed, because the laws were already signed by his uncle King Ferdinand, and the monarch had no right to revoke parliamentary laws which were already signed. The Habsburg government in Vienna proclaimed a new constitution, the so-called Stadion Constitution, on 4 March 1849. The centralist Stadion Constitution provided strong power for the monarch, and marked the way of neo-absolutism. The new March Constitution of Austria was drafted by the Imperial Diet of Austria, where Hungary had no representation. Austrian legislative bodies like the Imperial Diet traditionally had no power in Hungary. Despite this, the Imperial Diet also tried to abolish the Diet of Hungary (which existed as the supreme legislative power in Hungary since the late 12th century.) The Stadion Constitution also went against the historical constitution of Hungary, and tried to nullify it too. The revoking of the Hungarian April Laws and reduction of Hungary's territory and traditional status within the Habsburg Monarchy, prompted a renewal of the Hungarian Revolution. These events were deemed an existential threat for the Hungarian state.

== Diet at Debrecen ==
On 7 March 1849 an imperial proclamation was issued in the name of the emperor Francis Joseph, according to the new proclamation, the territory of Kingdom of Hungary would be administered by five military districts, while Principality of Transylvania would be reestablished. On 7 December the Diet of Hungary formally refused to acknowledge the title of the new king, "as without the knowledge and consent of the diet no one could sit on the Hungarian throne" and called the nation to arms. From a legal point of view, according to the coronation oath, a crowned Hungarian King can not relinquish the Hungarian throne during his life; if the king is alive and unable do his duty as ruler, a governor (or regent with proper English terminology) had to deputize the royal duties. Constitutionally, Ferdinand remained still the legal King of Hungary. If there is no possibility to inherit the throne automatically due to the death of the predecessor king (as king Ferdinand was still alive), but the monarch wants to relinquish his throne and appoint another king before his death, technically only one legal solution has remained: the parliament had the power to dethrone the king and elect his successor as the new King of Hungary. Due to the legal and military tensions, the Hungarian parliament did not make that favor for Franz Joseph. This event gave to the revolt an excuse of legality. Actually, from this time until the collapse of the revolution, Lajos Kossuth (as elected regent-president) became the de facto and de jure ruler of Hungary.

== Government ==
Szemere's cabinet
Portrait	Name	Start of office	End of office	Party	Notes
Prime Minister Minister of the Interior
	Bertalan Szemere	2 May 1849	11 August 1849	Opposition Party	
Minister of Foreign Affairs Minister of Agriculture, Industry and Trade
	Kázmér Batthyány	2 May 1849	11 August 1849	Opposition Party	First Hungarian Minister of Foreign Affairs
Minister of Finance
	Ferenc Duschek	2 May 1849	11 August 1849	Independent	
Minister of Justice
	Sebő Vukovics	2 May 1849	11 August 1849	Opposition Party	
Minister of Defense
	Lázár Mészáros	2 May 1849	7 May 1849	Peace Party	Provisional
	Artúr Görgei	7 May 1849	7 July 1849	Independent	
	Lajos Aulich	14 July 1849	11 August 1849	Independent	
Minister of Religion and Education
	Mihály Horváth	2 May 1849	11 August 1849	Independent	
Minister of Public Works and Transport
	László Csány	2 May 1849	11 August 1849	Opposition Party	

== Military situation ==
=== Initial setbacks ===
The struggle opened with a series of Austrian successes. Prince Windischgrätz, who had received orders to quell the rebellion, began his advance on 15 December; opened up the way to the capital by the victory at Mór (on 30 December), and on 5 January 1849 the Imperial-Royal Army occupied Pest and Buda, while the Hungarian government and diet retired behind the Tisza and established themselves at Debrecen. A last attempt at reconciliation made by the more moderate members of the Diet of Hungary, in Windischgrätz's camp at Bicske (on 3 January), had foundered on the uncompromising attitude of the Austrian commander, who demanded unconditional submission; whereupon the moderates, including Ferenc Deák and Lajos Batthyány, retired into private life, leaving Kossuth to carry on the struggle with the support of the enthusiastic extremists who constituted the rump of the diet at Debrecen. The question now was: how far the military would subordinate itself to the civil element of the national government. The first symptom of dissonance was a proclamation by the commander of the Upper Danube division, Artúr Görgey, from his camp at Vác (on 5 January) emphasizing the fact that the national defence was purely constitutional, and warning all who might be led astray from this standpoint by republican aspirations. Immediately after this proclamation Görgey disappeared with his army among the hills of Upper Hungary, and, despite the difficulties of a phenomenally severe winter and the constant pursuit of vastly superior forces, fought his way down to the valley of Hernád – and safety. This successful winter campaign first revealed Görgey's military ability. His success caused some jealousy in official quarters, and when, in the middle of February 1849, a commander-in-chief was appointed to carry out Kossuth's plan of campaign, the appointment was given not to Görgey, but to Count Henrik Dembinski, who, after fighting the bloody and indecisive battle of Kápolna (26–27 February 1849), was forced to retreat.

=== Hungarian offensive ===
After the battle of Kápolna, Görgey was immediately appointed commander-in-chief, replacing Dembinski. Ably supported by György Klapka and János Damjanich, he successfully pushed back the Austrian forces. The battles of Szolnok (on 5 March), Isaszeg (on 6 April), Vác (on 10 April), and Nagysarló (on 19 April) were important successes for the Hungarians. On 21 May 1849, Buda, the Hungarian capital, was recaptured by the Hungarian forces.

=== Worsening political situation ===
Meanwhile, the earlier events of the war had so altered the political situation that any idea which the diet at Debrecen had cherished of a compromise with Austria was destroyed. The capture of Pest-Buda had confirmed the Austrian court in its policy of unification, which after the victory of Kápolna they thought it safe to proclaim. On 7 March the diet of Kremsier was dissolved, and immediately afterwards a proclamation was issued in the name of the emperor Francis Joseph establishing a united constitution for the whole empire, of which the Kingdom of Hungary, cut up into half a dozen administrative districts, was henceforth to be little more than the largest of several subject provinces. The news of this manifesto, arriving as it did simultaneously with that of Görgey's successes, destroyed the last vestiges of a desire of the Hungarian revolutionists to compromise, and on 14 April 1849, on the motion of Kossuth, the diet proclaimed the independence of Hungary, declared the House of Habsburg as false and perjured, forever excluded from the throne, and elected Lajos Kossuth Governor-President of the Hungarian State. This was an execrable blunder in the circumstances, and the results were fatal to the national cause. Neither the government nor the army could accommodate itself to the new situation. From henceforth the military and civil authorities, as represented by Kossuth and Görgey, were hopelessly out of sympathy with each other, and the breach widened until all effective co-operation became impossible.

=== Austro-Russian counteroffensive ===
Meanwhile, the defeats of the Imperial-Royal Army and the course of events in Hungary had compelled the court of Vienna to accept the assistance which the emperor Nicholas I of Russia had proffered in the loftiest spirit of the Holy Alliance. The Austro-Russian alliance was announced at the beginning of May, and before the end of the month the common plan of campaign had been arranged. The Austrian commander-in-chief, Count Haynau, was to attack Hungary from the west, the Russian Prince Paskevich, from the north, gradually surrounding the rebels, and then advancing to deal a decisive blow in the mid-Tisza counties. They had at their disposal 375,000 men, while the Hungarians had 160,000. The Hungarians, too, were now more than ever divided among themselves, with no plan of campaign and no commander-in-chief appointed to replace Görgey, whom Kossuth had deposed. Haynau's first victories (20–28 June) put an end to their indecisions. On 2 July the Hungarian government abandoned Pest and transferred its capital first to Szeged and finally to Arad. The Imperial Russian Army was by this time well on its way to the Tisza, and the defeat of the Hungarian State became imminent. Kossuth again appointed as commander-in-chief the brave but inefficient Dembinski, who was utterly routed at Temesvár (on 9 August) by Haynau. This was the last great battle of the War of Independence. This put the Hungarian leadership in an untenable position that led to their surrender.

== End of the uprising and aftermath ==
On 13 August 1849, Görgey, who had been appointed dictator by the panic-stricken government two days before, surrendered the remnant of his hardly pressed army to the Russian General Theodor von Rüdiger at Világos. The other army corps and all the fortresses followed suit, Fort Monostor in Komárom, staunchly defended by György Klapka, being the last to capitulate (on 27 September). Kossuth and his associates, who had left Arad on 10 August, took refuge in Ottoman territory. A period of repressions followed. Lajos Batthyány and about 100 others were executed for their involvement in the uprising and martial law was proclaimed in Hungary. National expression, such as showing the Hungarian colours, was banned. The period that followed, "Bach absolutism", was marked by censorship and government persecution in fear of another revolution. The Austrian Empire became more centralised, with one universal constitution.

== See also ==
- History of Hungary
- Revolutions of 1848 in the Austrian Empire
