= Peace Party (Hungary, 1848) =

Peace Party Békepárt
- Founded: 28 August 1848
- Dissolved: 1849
- Succeeded by: Address Party; Resolution Party
- Headquarters: Budapest, Kingdom of Hungary
- Ideology: Liberalism; Conservative liberalism Constitutional monarchy Peace with Austria '47 ideology
- Political position: Center-right
- Colours: Light blue

The Peace Party (Hungarian: Békepárt) was a political party in the Hungarian State which sought to make a peace agreement with the Austrian Habsburg dynasty. There was no accepted leader of the party, and some historians have questioned the existence of the party. Nonetheless, there were some notable leaders, including Miklós Wesselényi, Gábor Kazinczy, Lajos Kovács, and Pál Nyáry. They were generally seen as liberal, albeit more conservative than Lajos Kossuth.
