= Politics in 19th-century Hungary =

Politics in 19th-century Hungary substantially driven by the "Ideology of '47, '48, '49 and '67", which refer to a set of different normative beliefs that were prevalent in the country in the second half of the 19th century. The political spectrum and the society changed dramatically during that time, especially through decisive events such as the Hungarian Revolution of 1848 or the Ausgleich in 1867. Many scholars have argued that this had a transformative effect not only on the legal and governmental systems of the time, but also on the legal claims of different social groups which resulted in the formation of a new political landscape after both major historical events.

== Before the Ausgleich (1867) ==
After the Hungarian Revolution of 1848 there was a need for the creation of diverse political directions in Hungary. Three distinguishable ideologies were created - '47ers, '48ers and '49ers.

=== '47ers ===
The '47ers wanted to restore the conditions before the revolution. They were sometimes termed ancient conservatives, and even though they stood the closest to the court, their ideas about the extent and the way of Hungary's self-government met with criticism by the Vienna court. Typical '47ers like Sámuel Jósika and Emil Dessewffy were the ruling figures of the Conservative Party before or during the revolution. István Széchenyi had the greatest ideological and financial influence on them. They were on several issues ideological closer to the '48ers than to the '49ers.

=== '48ers ===
The '48ers sought to achieve the goals and ideals of the revolution, based on the April Laws, requiring the fulfillment of the aims of the revolution preferably by negotiations led by Ferenc Deák. At the 1861 parliamentary elections the Address Party, and at the parliamentary election in 1865 the Deák Party represented these ideas.

=== '49ers ===
The 49-ers were the ideological successors of the former Opposition Party. The '49ers wanted to achieve the 1849 conditions, like the dethronement of the House of Habsburg, the conversion of Hungary into a republic and the independence from Austria which was considered radical. In 1861 László Teleki and the Resolution Party then at the parliamentary election in 1865 a part of the Left Centre, but especially the Far-Left fraction of the Left Centre represedented these ideas. Their unofficial leader was Lajos Kossuth.

== After the Ausgleich (1867) ==
The conclusion of the Ausgleich and the establishment of the dual monarchy of Austria-Hungary created new political conditions. The previous political directions lost their raison d'etre and meaning, therefore new ones had to be formed. Although their political ideas did not change significantly, new goals had to be set.

=== '67ers ===
The '67ers were in favor of the Ausgleich and the April Laws. Their ideological leader was Ferenc Deák, the head of the Deák Party. They won the first parliamentary election after the Ausgleich in 1869 and also the second in 1872. The Deák Party merged with the main opposition force, the Left Centre on 1 March 1875 and formed the Liberal Party which won every single election with stable majority until 1905. They are seen as the right-wing of the Diet of Hungary.

=== New '48ers ===
The New '48ers were mostly former '49ers, but also those '47ers or '48ers who opposed the Ausgleich and disagreed with Deák on important issues. The most radical '48ers were members of the National 1848 Party (also known as the Far-Left), while the moderates in the Left Center. When the Deák Party and the Left Center began to move closer together, first the Principled Left Center and then the Independence Party split of the Left Center.

The Principled Left Center and the National 1848 Party (also known as Far-Left) united in 1874 and formed the Independence Party of 1848. Then, for ten years, the Independence Party of 1848 and the Independence Party were the two biggest parties of the opposition, under the leadership of Lajos Mocsáry and Dániel Irányi. These were united in 1884 as the Party of Independence and '48, which became the largest opposition party and the largest new '48er party of Austria-Hungary. The party disintegrated several times and re-united (sometimes tracefully) until the fall of the monarchy. They came to power only once, between 1906 and 1910. They are seen as the left-wing of the Diet of Hungary.
