= Liberalism and radicalism in Hungary =

This article gives an overview of liberalism and radicalism in Hungary. It is limited to liberal and radical parties with substantial support, mainly proved by having had a representation in parliament. Modern Hungarian liberalism mostly opposed Viktor Orbán's government from 2010 to 2026 and claimed it to be undemocratic, quasi-democratic or hybrid.

From the start of liberalism in Hungary its program is combined with the struggle for independence from the Habsburg-rule and thus more autonomy in the country's affairs in relation with the Austrian Empire and later Austria-Hungary. The two realists groups, Deákists and Kossuthists, differ in their attitude towards the Habsburg rulers. Both groups had a conservative liberal or even conservative philosophy by the beginning of the 20th century.

== History ==
In the antebellum period, liberalism was very successful and led by the party of Károlyi, but after the communist revolution of 1919, and during the conservative regency, liberalism became limited to small city-based parties. After the 1988 end of communist rule, liberalism reconstituted itself in the Alliance of Free Democrats (Szabad Demokraták Szövetsége, member LI, ELDR), a center market liberal party. Originally also the Young Democrats chose a liberal profile, but soon they developed into a national-conservative party.

=== Opposition Party ===
- 1847: Liberal opposition led by Ferenc Deák and Lajos Kossuth formed the Opposition Party.
- 1849: The party is banned.

=== Radical Party ===
- 1849: Radical liberals formed the illegal Radical Party.
- 1868: The party joined with the new 1848 Party.

=== From Address Party to Liberal Party ===
- 1861: The moderate followers of Ferenc Deák formed the Address Party.
- 1866: After a compromise with the Austrian rulers, the party is reorganized into the conservative liberal Deák Party.
- 1875: The party merged with the conservative Left Centre into the conservative liberal Liberal Party.
- 1876: The liberal wing seceded as the Independent Liberal Party.
- 1899: The National Party joined the party.
- 1904: The National Party seceded from the party.
- 1906: The party was dissolved.

=== From Extreme Left to Kossuth Party ===
- 1867: Going back to the traditions of the Opposition, liberals formed the Independence and 1848 Party.
- 1868: The party united with the former radicals into the Independence and 1848 Party.
- 1874: A faction seceded and formed the Independence Party.
- 1884: The parties reunited into the Independence and 1848 Party.
- 1895: An agrarian faction formed the Independence and 1848 Party of Ug.
- 1904: The parties reunited.
- 1905: The National Party joined.
- 1908: A left-wing faction seceded as the Left Party.
- 1909: A conservative faction formed the 1848 Independence Kossuth Party.
- 1910: The Left Party rejoined the party.
- 1912: The radical Countrywide Republican Party seceded.
- 1913: The party merged with the 1848 Independence Kossuth Party into the United Independence and 1848 Party.
- 1916: The liberal wing seceded as the Independence and 1848 Károlyi Party.
- 1919: The party, now a conservative party, is renamed Independence and 1848 Party

and in 1924, it was renamed the Kossuth Party. It was disbanded by 1945.

=== Independence Party ===
- 1874: A faction of the 1848 Party formed the Independence Party.
- 1884: The parties reunited into the Independence and 1848 Party.

=== From Independent Liberal Party to National Party ===
- 1876: The liberal wing of the Liberal Party formed the Independent Liberal Party.
- 1878: It joined the more conservative groups and the United Opposition was formed.
- 1881: The party is reorganised into the Moderate Opposition.
- 1891: The party is renamed National Party.
- 1899: It joined the Liberal Party.
- 1904: The party seceded from the Liberal Party.
- 1905: It joined the Independence and 1848 Party.

=== From Communal Democratic Party to Civic Democratic Party ===
- 1894: Budapest liberals formed the Civic Democratic Party.
- 1900: The party is reorganized into a national party and named Civic Democratic Party.
- 1918: The party split into the National Socialist Party and the Liberal Citizen's Party.
- 1919: The parties reunited into the National Democratic Party.
- 1926: The party merged with the FKFPP into the Independent National Democratic Party.
- 1928: The former FKPP secedes and the party is renamed National Democratic Party.
- 1942: The party was dissolved.
- 1944: The party is reorganized into the Civic Democratic Party.
- 1949: The PDP joined the left-wing non-Marxist Hungarian Radical Party.

=== Left Party ===
- 1908: A left-wing faction of the Independence and 1848 Party formed the Left Party.
- 1910: The party rejoined with the Independence and 1848 Party.

=== Countrywide Republican Party ===
- 1912: A radical faction of the Independence and 1848 Party formed the Countrywide Republican Party.
- 1913: The party is banned.

=== Independence and 1848 Károlyi Party ===
- 1916: The liberal wing of the United Independence and 1848 Party formed the Independence and 1848 Party, led by Mihály Károlyi.
- 1919: After a communist coup, the party is dissolved.

=== Countrywide Civic Radical Party ===
- 1916: Radical liberals formed the Countrywide Civic Radical Party.
- 1919: The party was dissolved.

=== Liberal Citizens' Party ===
- 1918: A faction of the Civic Democratic Party formed the Liberal Citizens' Party.
- 1919: The parties reunited into the National Democratic Party.

=== From Independence Party of Smallholders, Agrarian Workers and Citizens to Civic Freedom Party ===
- 1921: Károly Rassay formed, in an attempt to find liberal support outside the cities, the liberal Independence Party of Smallholders, Agrarian Workers and Citizens.
- 1926: The party merged into the Independent National Democratic Party.
- 1928: The party is reconstituted as the National Liberal Party.
- 1934: The party is renamed the Civic Freedom Party.
- 1944: The remnants of the party joined the Civic Democratic Party.

=== Alliance of Free Democrats ===
- 1988: Just before the collapse of the communist regime, the liberal Alliance of Free Democrats party was formed.
- 2010: The Alliance of Free Democrats fell out of the Parliament, and split into several parties.
- 2013: Former SZDSZ members founded the Hungarian Liberal Party.
- 2020s: MLP became inactive and de facto merged into Democratic Coalition

=== Momentum Movement ===
- 2015: The Momentum Movement has been founded.
- 2017: Momentum Movement became a party.

=== Tisza Party ===
- 2020: The minor, conservative Tisza Party is found
- 2024: Péter Magyar joins and takes over Tisza Party, transforming it into a conservative liberal force

== Liberal leaders ==
=== 19th century ===
- Lajos Kossuth, Prime Minister of the Kingdom of Hungary from 1848 to 1849, Governor-President of the Hungarian State in 1849
- Ferenc Deák, Minister of Justice in 1848
- Kálmán Tisza, Prime Minister of the Kingdom of Hungary from 1875 to 1890
- Kálmán Ghyczy, Minister of Finance from 1874 to 1875

=== 20th and 21st century ===
- Mihály Károlyi, Prime Minister and 1st President of Hungary after the Aster Revolution from 1918 to 1919, member of the Party of Independence and '48
- Árpád Göncz, 1st non-communist President of Hungary from 1990 to 2000, member of the Alliance of Free Democrats
- Ferenc Gyurcsány, Prime Minister of Hungary from 2004 to 2009, while being the leader of the nominally social democratic Hungarian Socialist Party, he was ideologically closer to social liberalism, and led a social liberal Democratic Coalition
- Péter Magyar, Prime Minister of Hungary from 2026, leader of the conservative liberal Tisza Party

== See also ==
- History of Hungary
- Politics of Hungary
- List of political parties in Hungary
- Politics in 19th-century Hungary
