= Hungarian Declaration of Independence =

1849 proclamation of Hungarian independence from the Habsburg Monarchy

- Coat of Arms of the Kingdom of Hungary (1849)
- Date: 14 April 1849
- Location: Protestant Great Church of Debrecen, Hungary
- Participants: Kingdom of Hungary

The Hungarian Declaration of Independence declared the independence of Hungary from the Habsburg Dynasty during the Hungarian Revolution of 1848.

The Declaration of Independence severed Hungary’s dynastic allegiance to the House of Habsburg-Lorraine and dissolved the personal union linking the Kingdom of Hungary to the other Habsburg realms. The text did not frame this act as "secession from the Austrian Empire" (established in 1804), because the Kingdom of Hungary had never been constitutionally part of that empire.

The declaration of Hungarian independence was made possible by the positive mood created by the military successes of the Spring Campaign. It was presented to the National Assembly in closed session on 13 April 1849 by Lajos Kossuth, and in open session the following day, despite political opposition from within the Hungarian Peace Party. The declaration was passed unanimously the following day. The Declaration accused the Habsburg dynasty of treachery, treason, perjury, and waging war against the Hungarian nation, declaring Franz Joseph's actions as a rebellion against the ancient constitutional order.

== Usurpation of the Hungarian throne ==
On 7 December 1848, the Diet of Hungary formally refused to acknowledge the title of the new Habsburg monarch (Franz Joseph), "as without the knowledge and consent of the diet no one could sit on the Hungarian throne", and called the nation to arms. While in most Western European countries (like France and the United Kingdom) the monarch's reign began immediately upon the death of their predecessor, in Hungary the coronation was indispensable; if it were not properly executed, the kingdom remained "orphaned".

Even during the long personal union between the Kingdom of Hungary and other Habsburg ruled areas, the Habsburg monarchs had to be crowned as King of Hungary in order to promulgate laws there or exercise royal prerogatives in the territory of the Kingdom of Hungary. From a legal point of view, according to the coronation oath, a crowned Hungarian king could not relinquish the Hungarian throne during his life; if the king was alive and unable to do his duty as ruler, a governor (or regent, as they would be called in English) had to assume the royal duties. Constitutionally, Franz Joseph's uncle Ferdinand was still the legal king of Hungary. If there was no possibility to inherit the throne automatically due to the death of the predecessor king (since King Ferdinand was still alive), but the monarch wanted to relinquish his throne and appoint another king before his death, technically only one legal solution remained: the parliament had the power to dethrone the king and elect a new king. Due to the legal and military tensions, the Hungarian parliament did not grant Franz Joseph that favour.

Francis Joseph was, in the strict constitutional sense, a textbook usurper in Hungary: under the Pragmatic Sanction of 1723 (Arts. I–III) and the established Hungarian constitutional law governing succession and coronation, the throne was not vacant while the crowned King Ferdinand V was still alive, and Ferdinand’s unilateral abdication could not by itself make Francis Joseph King of Hungary; without the consent of the Hungarian Diet, the constitutional oath, and coronation with the Holy Crown, Francis Joseph had no lawful authority to exercise the Hungarian royal power—his seizure of that power thus constituting a clear case of usurpation. In short: Francis Joseph was regarded by Hungarians as a usurper and a rebel against the ancient constitution and the established order.

== Dethronement of the Habsburg dynasty ==
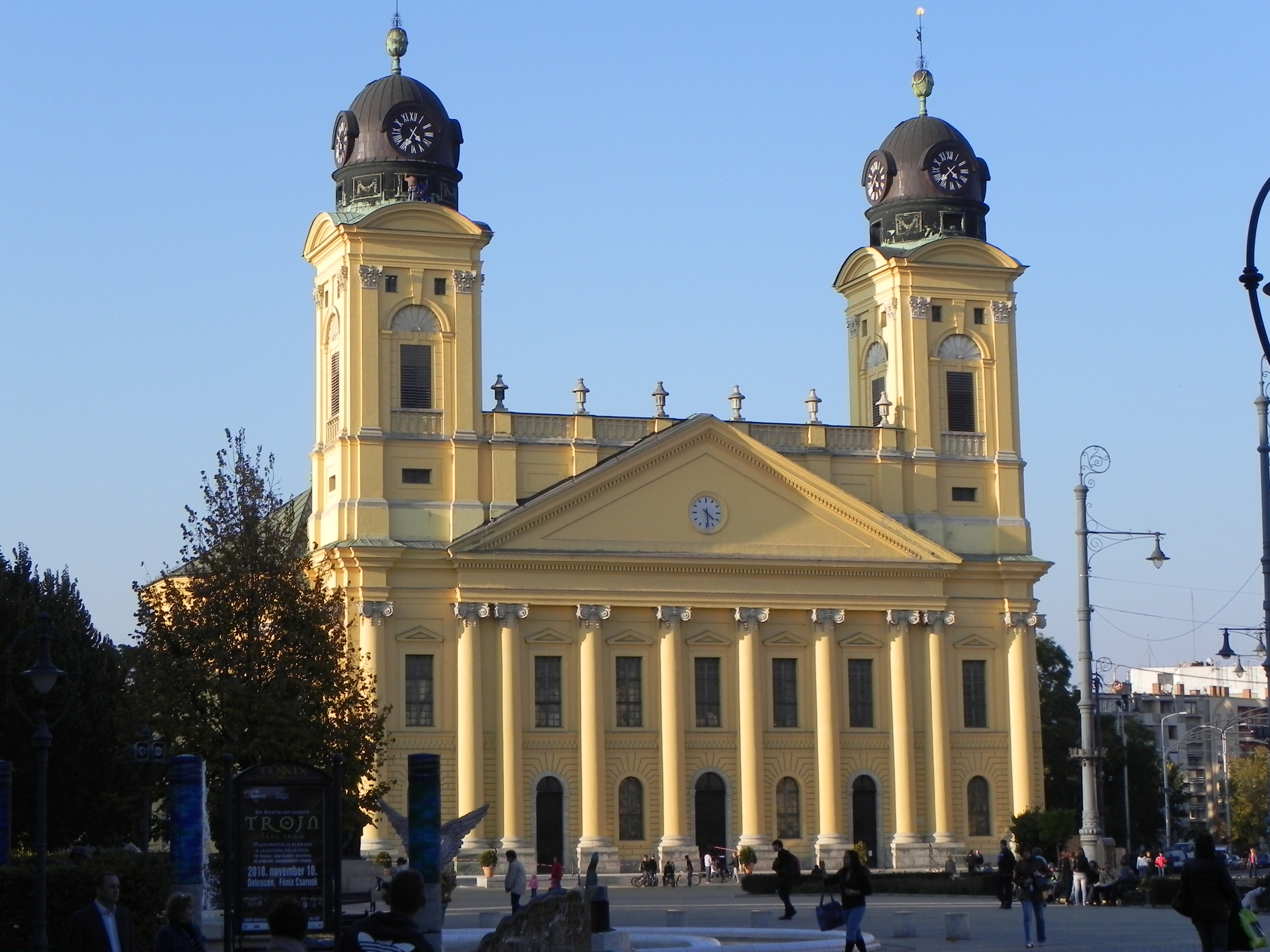
Protestant Great Church of Debrecen

The dethronement was prompted by four principal causes.

- The first was the Imperial Constitution of Olmütz, proclaimed on 4 March 1849, which threatened to strip Hungary of its ancient constitution, abolish its old parliamental system and extinguish its thousand-year-old statehood and reduce it to a mere province within the centralized Austrian Empire. This provoked a widespread outrage in Hungary and became a key immediate cause of the dethronement.
- The second cause was Francis Joseph's usurpation of the Hungarian throne;
- The third was the repudiation by the Habsburg court of the April Laws, which had been enacted by the Hungarian Diet and sanctioned by King Ferdinand V on 11 April 1848;
- And fourth, most decisively, the "usurper's" attempt to forcibly overthrow Hungary's legitimate constitutional government and elected representative parliament by the Habsburg army, which was interpreted by the government and Hungarian parliament as an "attempted coup by military force". The Hungarian Diet consequently declared the dethronement of the entire Habsburg-Lorraine dynasty at the Great Calvinist Church of Debrecen on 14 April 1849.

This event gave to the revolt an excuse of legality. Actually, from this time until the collapse of the revolution, Lajos Kossuth (as elected regent-president) became the de facto and de jure head of state of Hungary.

== Declaration of independence ==
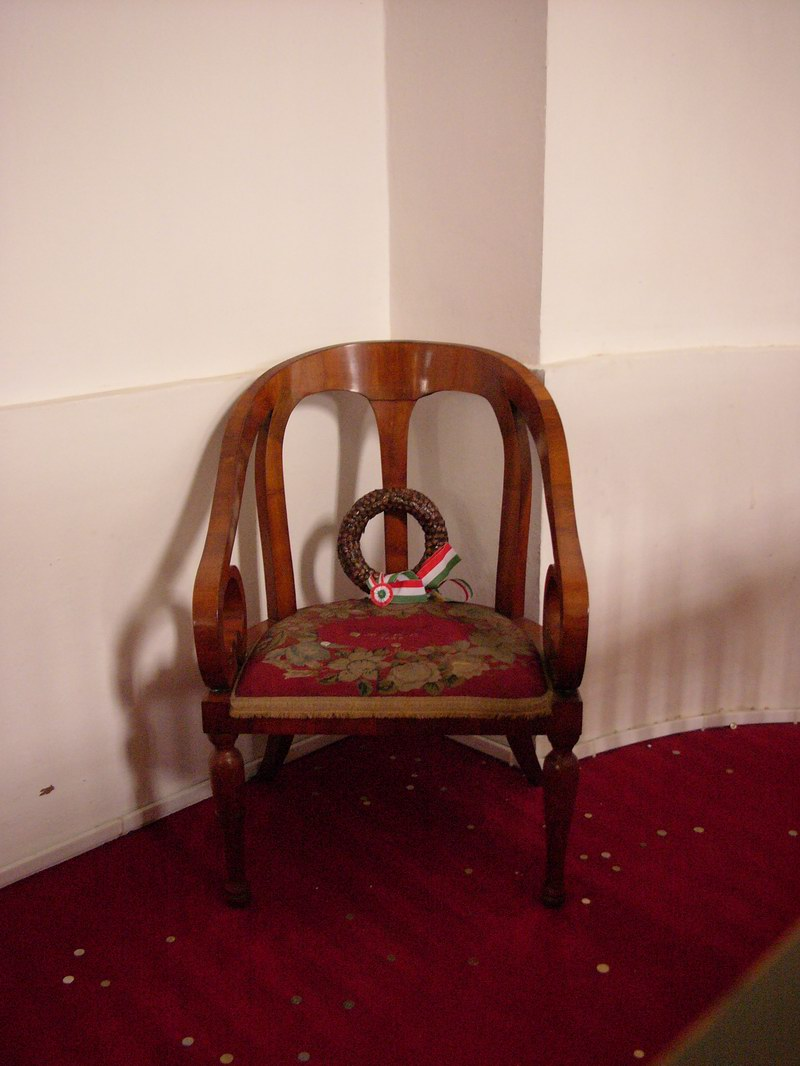
The chair of Kossuth in the Great Protestant Church of Debrecen (1848)

The declaration accused the Habsburgs of crimes, saying

The House of Habsburg-Lorraine is unexampled in the compass of its perjuries [...] Its determination to extinguish the independence of Hungary has been accompanied by a succession of criminal acts, comprising robbery, destruction of property by fire, murder, maiming [...] Humanity will shudder when reading this disgraceful page of history. [...] "The house of Habsburg has forfeited the throne".

— Kossuth, In Liszt, The Weimar Years

In a banquet speech before the Corporation of New York, Kossuth urged the United States to recognize Hungarian independence, saying

The third object of my humble wishes, gentlemen, is the recognition of the independence of Hungary. [...] our Declaration of Independence was not only voted unanimously in our Congress, but every county, every municipality, has solemnly declared its consent and adherence to it; so it became not the supposed, but by the whole realm positively, and sanctioned by the fundamental laws of Hungary.

— Kossuth, In Headley's Life of Kossuth

== The declaration ==
But no one can by any family compact dispose of the constitutional throne without the Hungarian nation.

— Lajos Kossuth, Declaration of Independence by the Hungarian Nation (14 April 1849), translated and abridged by Francis William Newman (1853).

DECLARATION OF INDEPENDENCE BY THE HUNGARIAN NATION.

[The reader may be glad to possess the most important portions of this celebrated document. The opponents of Kossuth have of late pretended, that the deposition of the Hapsburgs caused the overthrow of Hungary. But the deposition was not carried until Austria was thoroughly beaten, and Russia had engaged to give her utmost aid. This finally united all Hungary. At no earlier period would Hungary have acted with full unanimity in so decisive a step. To have delayed it longer would not have averted Russian invasion, and would have caused deep discontent in Hungary. Nothing but the wilful disobedience of Görgey, who wasted a month at Buda at this very crisis, saved the Hapsburgs from being conquered in Vienna, before the Russian armies could possibly come up.]

We, the legally-constituted representatives of the Hungarian nation assembled in Diet, do by these presents solemnly proclaim, in maintenance of the inalienable natural rights of Hungary, with all its appurtenances and dependencies, to occupy the position of an Independent European state; that the house of Lorraine-Hapsburg, as perjured in the sight of God and man, has forfeited its right to the Hungarian throne. At the same time, we feel ourselves bound in duty to make known the motives and reasons which have impelled us to this decision, that the civilized world may learn we have not taken this step out of overweening confidence in our own wisdom, or out of revolutionary excitement, but that it is an act of the last necessity, adopted to preserve from utter destruction a nation persecuted to the limit of the most enduring patience.

Three hundred years have passed since the Hungarian nation, by free election, placed the house of Austria upon its throne, in accordance with stipulations made on both sides, and ratified by treaty. These three hundred years have been, for the country, a period of uninterrupted suffering.

The Creator has blessed this country with all the elements of wealth and happiness. Its area of one hundred and ten thousand square miles presents, in varied profusion, innumerable sources of prosperity. Its population, numbering nearly fifteen millions, feels the glow of youthful strength within its veins, and has shown temper and docility which warrant its proving at once the main organ of civilization in Eastern Europe, and the guardian of that civilization when attacked. Never was a more grateful task appointed to a reigning dynasty by the dispensation of Providence than that which devolved upon the house of Lorraine-Hapsburg. It would have sufficed, to do nothing to impede the development of the country. Had this been the rule observed, Hungary would now rank among the most prosperous nations. It was only necessary that it should not envy the Hungarians the moderate share of constitutional liberty which they timidly maintained during the difficulties of a thousand years with rare fidelity to their sovereigns, and the house of Hapsburg might long have counted this nation among the most faithful adherents of the throne.

This dynasty, however, which can at no epoch point to a ruler who based his power on the freedom of the people, adopted a course towards this nation, from father to son, which deserves the appellation of perjury.

The house of Austria has publicly used every effort to deprive the country of its legitimate Independence and Constitution, designing to reduce it to a level with the other provinces long since deprived of all freedom, and to unite all in a common sink of slavery. Foiled in this effort by the untiring vigilance of the nation, it directed its endeavour to lame the power, to check the progress of Hungary, causing it to minister to the gain of the provinces of Austria, but only to the extent which enabled those provinces to bear the load of taxation with which the prodigality of the imperial house weighed them down; having first deprived those provinces of all constitutional means of remonstrating against a policy which was not based upon the welfare of the subject, but solely tended to maintain despotism and crush liberty in every country of Europe.

It has frequently happened that the Hungarian nation, in despite of this systematized tyranny, has been obliged to take up arms in self-defence. Although constantly victorious in these constitutional struggles, yet so moderate has the nation ever been in its use of the victory, so strongly has it confided in the king's plighted word, that it has ever laid down arms as soon as the king, by new compacts and fresh oaths, has guaranteed the duration of its rights and liberty. But every new compact was as futile as those which preceded it; each oath which fell from the royal lips was but a renewal of previous perjuries. The policy of the house of Austria, which aimed at destroying the independence of Hungary as a state, has been pursued unaltered for three hundred years.

It was in vain that the Hungarian nation shed its blood for the deliverance of Austria whenever it was in danger; vain were all the sacrifices which it made to serve the interests of the reigning house; in vain did it, on the renewal of the royal promises, forget the wounds which the past had inflicted; vain was the fidelity cherished by the Hungarians for their king, and which, in moments of danger, assumed a character of devotion; they were in vain, since the history of the government of that dynasty in Hungary presents but an unbroken series of perjured deeds from generation to generation.

In spite of such treatment, the Hungarian nation has all along respected the tie by which it was united to this dynasty; and in now decreeing its expulsion from the throne, it acts under the natural law of self-preservation, being driven to pronounce this sentence by the full conviction that the house of Lorraine-Hapsburg is compassing the destruction of Hungary as an independent State: so that this dynasty has been the first to tear the bands by which it was united to the Hungarian nation, and to confess that it had torn them in the face of Europe. For many causes a nation is justified, before God and man, in expelling a reigning dynasty. Among such are the following:

1. When the dynasty forms alliances with the enemies of the country, with robbers, or partizan chieftains to oppress the nation: 2. When it attempts to annihilate the Independence of the country and its Constitution, supported on oaths, by attacking with an armed force the people who have committed no act of revolt: 3. When the integrity of a country, which the sovereign has sworn to maintain, is violated, and its resources cut away: 4. When foreign armies are employed to murder the people, and to oppress their liberties.

Each of the grounds here enumerated would justify the exclusion of a dynasty from the throne. But the House of Lorraine-Hapsburg is unexampled in the compass of its perjuries, and has committed every one of these crimes against the nation.***

In former times, a governing COUNCIL, under the name of the Royal Hungarian Stadtholdership, the president of which was the Palatine, held its seat at Buda, whose sacred duty it was to watch over the integrity of the state, the inviolability of the Constitution, and the sanctity of the laws; but this collegiate authority not presenting any element of personal responsibility, the Vienna cabinet gradually degraded this council to the position of an administrative organ of court absolutism. In this manner, while Hungary had ostensibly an independent government, the despotic Vienna cabinet disposed at will of the money and blood of the people for foreign purposes, postponing our commercial interests to the success of courtly cabals, injurious to the welfare of the people, so that we were excluded from all connection with the other countries of the world, and were degraded to the position of a colony. The mode of governing by a MINISTRY was intended to put a stop to these proceedings, which caused the rights of the country to moulder uselessly in its parchments; by the change,[*] these rights and the royal oath were both to become a reality. It was the apprehension of this, and especially the fear of losing its control over the money and blood of the country, which caused the house of Austria to resolve on involving Hungary, by the foulest intrigues, in the horrors of fire and slaughter, that, having plunged the country in a civil war, it might seize the opportunity to dismember the kingdom, and to blot out the name of Hungary from the list of independent nations, and unite its plundered and bleeding limbs with the Austrian monarchy.

[Footnote *: The change was solemnly enacted in the Parliamentary Laws of March, 1848, which King Ferdinand V. sanctioned by his public oath in April, 1848.]

The beginning of this course was, (after a Ministry had been called into existence), by ordering an Austrian general [Jellachich] to rise in rebellion against the laws of the country and nominating him Ban of Croatia, a kingdom belonging to the kingdom of Hungary.***

The Ban revolted therefore in the name of the emperor, and rebelled openly against the king of Hungary, who is however one and the same person; and he went so far as to decree the separation of Croatia and Slavonia from Hungary, with which they had been united for eight hundred years, as well as to incorporate them with the Austrian empire. Public opinion and undoubted facts threw the blame of these proceedings on the Archduke Louis, uncle to the emperor, on his brother, the Archduke Francis Charles, and especially on the consort of the last-named prince, the Archduchess Sophia; and since the Ban, in this act of rebellion, openly alleged that he acted as a faithful subject of the emperor, the ministry of Hungary requested their sovereign, by a public declaration, to wipe off the stigma which these proceedings threw upon the family. At that moment affairs were not prosperous for Austria in Italy; the emperor therefore did proclaim that the Ban and his associates were guilty of high treason, and of exciting to rebellion. But while publishing this edict, the Ban and his accomplices were covered with favours at court, and supplied for their enterprise with money, arms, and ammunition. The Hungarians, confiding in the royal proclamation, and not wishing to provoke a civil conflict, did not hunt out those proscribed traitors in their lair, and only adopted measures for checking any extension of the rebellion. But soon afterward the inhabitants of South Hungary, of Servian race, were excited to rebellion by precisely the same means.

These were also declared by the king to be rebels, but were nevertheless, like the others, supplied with money, arms, and ammunition. The king's commissioned officers and civil servants enlisted bands of robbers in the principality of Servia to strengthen the rebels, and aid them in massacring the peaceable Hungarian and German inhabitants of the Banat. The command of these rebellious bodies was further entrusted to the rebel leaders of the Croatians.

During this rebellion of the Hungarian Servians, scenes of cruelty were witnessed at which the heart shudders; the peaceable inhabitants were tortured with a cruelty which makes the hair stand on end. Whole towns and villages, once flourishing, were laid waste. Hungarians fleeing before these murderers were reduced to the condition of vagrants and beggars in their own country; the most lovely districts were converted into a wilderness.***

The greater part of the Hungarian regiments were, according to the old system of government, scattered through the other provinces of the empire. In Hungary itself, the troops quartered were mostly Austrian; and they afforded more protection to the rebels than to the laws, or to the internal peace of the country. The withdrawal of these troops, and the return of the national militia, was demanded of the government, but was either refused, or its fulfilment delayed; and when our brave comrades, on hearing the distress of the country, returned in masses, they were persecuted, and such as were obliged to yield to superior force were disarmed, and sentenced to death for having defended their country against rebels.

The Hungarian ministry begged the king earnestly to issue orders to all troops and commanders of fortresses in Hungary, enjoining fidelity to the Constitution, and obedience to the ministers of Hungary. Such a proclamation was sent to the Palatine, the viceroy of Hungary, Archduke Stephen, at Buda. The necessary letters were written and sent to the post-office. But this nephew of the king, the Archduke Palatine, shamelessly caused these letters to be smuggled back from the post-office, although they had been countersigned by the responsible ministers; and they were afterward found among his papers when he treacherously departed from the country.

The rebel Ban menaced the Hungarian coast with an attack, and the government, with the king's consent, ordered an armed corps to march into Styria for the defence of Fiume; but this whole force received orders to march into Italy.***

The rebel force occupied Fiume, and disunited it from the kingdom of Hungary, and this hateful deception was disavowed by the Vienna cabinet as having been a misunderstanding; the furnishing of arms, ammunition, and money to the rebels of Croatia was also declared to have been a misunderstanding. Finally, instructions were issued to the effect that, until special orders were given, the army and the commanders of fortresses were not to follow the orders of the Hungarian ministers, but were to execute those of the Austrian cabinet.***

The king from that moment began to address the man whom he himself had branded as a rebel, as "dear and loyal" (Lieber Getreuer); he praised him for having revolted, and encouraged him to proceed in the path he had entered upon.

He expressed a like sympathy for the Servian rebels, whose hands yet reeked from the massacres they had perpetrated. It was under this command that the Ban of Croatia, after being proclaimed as a rebel, assembled an army, and announced his commission from the king to carry fire and sword into Hungary, upon which the Austrian troops stationed in the country united with him.***

Even then the Diet did not give up all confidence in the power of the royal oath, and the king was once more requested to order the rebels to quit the country. The answer given was a reference to a manifesto of the Austrian ministry, declaring it to be their determination to deprive the Hungarian nation of the independent management of their financial, commercial, and war affairs. The king at the same time refused his assent to the bills submitted for approval respecting troops and the subsidy for covering the expenditure.

Upon this the Hungarian ministers resigned, but the names submitted by the president of the council, at the demand of the king, were not approved of for successors. The Diet then, bound by its duty to secure the safety of the country, voted the supplies, and ordered the troops to be levied. The nation obeyed the summons with readiness.

The representatives of the people then summoned the nephew of the emperor to join the camp, and as Palatine[*] to lead the troops against the rebels. He not only obeyed the summons, but made public professions of his devotion to the cause. As soon, however, as an engagement threatened, he fled secretly from the camp and the country, like a coward traitor. Among his papers a plan, formed by him some time previously, was found, according to which Hungary was to be simultaneously attacked on nine sides at once—from Styria, Austria, Moravia, Silesia, Galicia, and Transylvania.

[Footnote *: The Palatine was a high officer elected by the Diet, as its organ, and the defender of its Constitution. In fact, they always elected a prince of the blood royal. He was virtually a Viceroy.]

From a correspondence with the Minister of War, seized at the same time, it was discovered that the commanding generals in the military frontier and the Austrian provinces adjoining Hungary had received orders to enter Hungary, and support the rebels with their united forces.

This attack from nine points at once really began. The most painful aggression took place in Transylvania; for the traitorous commander in that district did not content himself with the practices considered lawful in war by disciplined troops. He stirred up the Wallachian peasants to take up arms against their own constitutional rights, and, aided by the rebellious Servian hordes, commenced a course of Vandalism and extinction, sparing neither women, children, nor aged men; murdering and torturing the defenceless Hungarian inhabitants; burning the most flourishing villages and towns, among which, Nagy-Igmand, the seat of learning for Transylvania, was reduced to a heap of ruins.

But the Hungarian nation, although taken by surprise, unarmed and unprepared, did not abandon its future prospects in any agony of despair.

Measures were immediately taken to increase the small standing army by volunteers and the levy of the people. These troops, supplying the want of experience by the enthusiasm arising from the feeling that they had right on their side, defeated the Croatian armaments, and drove them out of the country.***

The defeated army fled in the direction of Vienna, where the emperor continued his demoralizing policy, and nominated the beaten and flying rebel as his plenipotentiary and substitute in Hungary, suspending by this act the constitution and institutions of the country, all its authorities, courts of justice, and tribunals, laying the kingdom under martial law, and placing in the hand of, and under the unlimited authority of, a rebel, the honour, the property and the lives of the people; in the hand of a man who, with armed bands, had braved the laws, and attacked the Constitution of the country.

But the house of Austria was not contented with the unjustifiable violation of oaths taken by its head.

The rebellious Ban was taken under the protection of the troops stationed near Vienna, and commanded by Prince Windischgrätz. These troops, after taking Vienna by storm, were led as an imperial Austrian army to conquer Hungary. But the Hungarian nation, persisting in its loyalty, sent an envoy to the advancing enemy. This envoy, coming under a flag of truce, was treated as a prisoner, and thrown into prison. No heed was paid to the remonstrances and the demands of the Hungarian nation for justice. The threat of the gallows was, on the contrary, thundered against all who had taken arms in defence of a wretched and oppressed country. But before the army had time to enter Hungary, a family revolution in the tyrannical reigning house was perpetrated at Olmütz. Ferdinand V. was forced to resign a throne which had been polluted with so much blood and perjury, and the son of Francis Charles, (who also abdicated his claim to the inheritance,) the youthful Archduke Francis Joseph, caused himself to be proclaimed Emperor of Austria and King of Hungary. But no one can by any family compact dispose of the constitutional throne without the Hungarian nation.

At this critical moment the Hungarian nation demanded nothing more than the maintenance of its laws and institutions, and peace guaranteed by their integrity. Had the assent of the nation to this change in the occupant of the throne been asked in a legal manner, and the young prince offered to take the customary oath that he would preserve the Constitution, the Hungarian nation would not have refused to elect him king in accordance with the treaties extant, and to crown him with St. Stephen's crown, before he had dipped his hand in the blood of the people.

He, however, refusing to perform an act so sacred in the eyes of God and man, and in strange contrast to the innocence natural to youthful breasts, declared in his first words his intention of conquering Hungary, (which he dared to call a rebellious country, whereas it was he himself that raised rebellion there,) and of depriving it of that independence which it had maintained for a thousand years, to incorporate it into the Austrian monarchy.***

But even then an attempt was made to bring about a peaceful arrangement, and a deputation was sent to the generals of the perjured dynasty. This house in its blind self-confidence, refused to enter into any negotiation, and dared to demand an unconditional submission from the nation. The deputation was further detained, and one of the number, the former President[*] of the Ministry, was even thrown into prison. Our deserted capital was occupied, and was turned into a place of execution; a part of the prisoners of war were there consigned to the axe, another part were thrown into dungeons, while the remainder were exposed to fearful sufferings from hunger, and were thus forced to enter the ranks of the army in Italy.

[Footnote *: Louis Bathyanyi. See Note to p. 6.]

[**]Finally, to reap the fruit of so much perfidy, the Emperor Francis Joseph dared to call himself King of Hungary, in the manifesto of the 9th of March [1849], wherein he openly declares that he erases the Hungarian nation from the list of the independent nations of Europe, and that he divides its territory into five parts, cutting off Transylvania, Croatia, Slavonia, and Fiume from Hungary, creating at the same time a principality (vayvodeschaft) for the Servian rebels, and, having paralyzed the political existence of the country, declares it incorporated into the Austrian monarchy.

[Footnote **: This paragraph, omitted above, is inserted here, where the reader will better understand it.]

The measure of the crimes of the Austrian house was, however, filled up, when, after[*] its defeat, it applied for help to the Emperor of Russia; and, in spite of the remonstrances and protestations of the Porte, and of the consuls of the European powers at Bucharest, in defiance of international rights, and to the endangering of the balance of power in Europe, caused the Russian troops, stationed at Wallachia, to be led into Transylvania, for the destruction of the Hungarian nation.

[Footnote *: The Russian army entered Transylvania on January 3d, 1849; this is the army which was driven out again. But the main Russian armies were only on the move in April, and took two months longer to enter Hungary. These were applied for late in March.]

Three months ago we were driven back upon the Theiss; our just arms have already recovered all Transylvania; Klausenburg, Hermanstadt, and Kronstadt are taken; one portion of the troops of Austria is driven into Bukowina; another, together with the Russian force sent to aid them, is totally defeated, and to the last man obliged to evacuate Transylvania, and to flee into Wallachia. Upper Hungary is cleared of foes.

The Servian rebellion is further suppressed; the forts of St. Thomas and the Roman intrenchment have been taken by storm, and the whole country between the Danube and the Theiss, including the country of Bacs, has been recovered for the nation.

The commander-in-chief of the perjured house of Austria has himself been defeated in five consecutive battles, and has with his whole army been driven back upon and even over the Danube.

Founding a line of conduct upon all these occurrences, and confiding in the justice of an eternal God, we in the face of the civilized world, in reliance upon the natural rights of the Hungarian nation, and upon the power it has developed to maintain them, further impelled by that sense of duty which urges every nation to defend its existence, do hereby declare and proclaim in the name of the nation regally represented by us, the following:—

1st. Hungary, with Transylvania, as legally united with it, and the possessions and dependencies, are hereby declared to constitute a free, independent, sovereign state. The territorial unity of this state is declared to be inviolable, and its territory to be indivisible.

2d. The house of Hapsburg-Lorraine—having by treachery, perjury, and levying of war against the Hungarian nation, as well as by its outrageous violation of all compacts, in breaking up the integral territory of the kingdom, in the separation of Transylvania, Croatia, Slavonia, Fiume, and its districts, from Hungary—further, by compassing the destruction of the independence of the country by arms, and by calling in the disciplined army of a foreign power, for the purpose of annihilating its nationality, by violation both of the Pragmatic Sanction and of treaties concluded between Austria and Hungary, on which the alliance between the two countries depended—is, as treacherous and perjured, for ever excluded from the throne of the united states of Hungary and Transylvania, and all their possessions and dependencies, and are hereby deprived of the style and title, as well as of the armorial bearings belonging to the crown of Hungary, and declared to be banished for ever from the united countries and their dependencies and possessions. They are therefore declared to be deposed, degraded, and banished for ever from the Hungarian territory.

3d. The Hungarian nation, in the exercise of its rights and sovereign will, being determined to assume the position of a free and independent state among the nations of Europe, declares it to be its intention to establish and maintain friendly and neighbourly relations with those states with which it was formerly united under the same sovereign, as well as to contract alliances with all other nations.

4th. The form of government to be adopted for the future will be fixed by the Diet of the nation.

But until this point shall be decided, on the basis of the foregoing and received principles which have been recognized for ages, the government of the united countries, their possessions and dependencies, shall be conducted on personal responsibility, and under the obligation to render an account of all acts, by Louis Kossuth, who has by acclamation, and with the unanimous approbation of the Diet of the nation, been named Governing President (Gubernator), and the ministers whom he shall appoint.

And this resolution of ours we proclaim for the knowledge of all nations of the civilized world, with the conviction that the Hungarian nation will be received by them among the free and independent nations of the world, with the same friendship and free acknowledgment of its rights which the Hungarians proffer to other countries.

We also hereby proclaim and make known to all the inhabitants of the united states of Hungary and Transylvania, their possessions and dependencies, that all authorities, communes, towns, and the civil officers, both in the counties and cities, are completely set free and released from all the obligations under which they stood, by oath or otherwise, to the said house of Hapsburg; and that any individual daring to contravene this decree, and by word or deed in any way to aid or abet any one violating it, shall be treated and punished as guilty of high treason. And by the publication of this decree, we hereby bind and oblige all the inhabitants of these countries to obedience to the government, now instituted formally, and endowed with all necessary legal powers.

Debreczin, April 14, 1849.

== Sources ==
- Deák, István (1979). The Lawful Revolution: Louis Kossuth and the Hungarians, 1848–1849. New York: Columbia University Press. ISBN 978-0-231-04602-2.
- Kontler, László (2002). A History of Hungary: Millennium in Central Europe. Basingstoke: Palgrave Macmillan.
- Molnár, Miklós (2001). A Concise History of Hungary. Cambridge Concise Histories. Anna Magyar. Cambridge, U.K. ; New York: Cambridge University Press. ISBN 978-0-521-66142-3.
- Sked, Alan (2001). The Decline and Fall of the Habsburg Empire, 1815–1918 (2nd ed.). London: Longman.
- Varga, Bálint (2021). "The Two Faces of the Hungarian Empire". Austrian History Yearbook. 52: 118–130. doi:10.1017/S0067237820000545.
