= Boldizsár Horvát =

Hungarian politician (1822–1898)

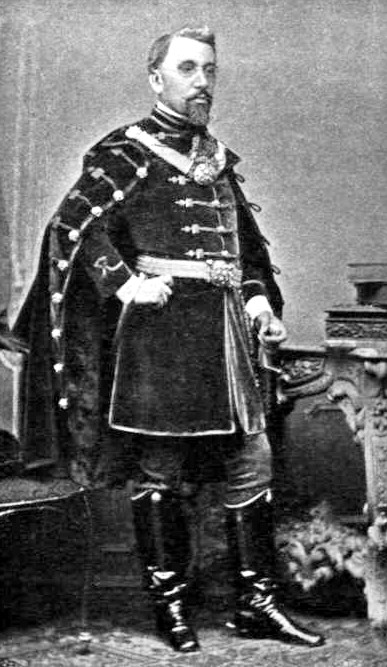

Minister of Justice of Hungary
- In office 20 February 1867 – 5 June 1871
- Preceded by: Sebő Vukovics
- Succeeded by: István Bittó

Personal details
- Born: 1 January 1822 Szombathely, Kingdom of Hungary
- Died: 28 October 1898 (aged 76) Budapest, Austria-Hungary
- Party: Deák Party, Liberal Party
- Children: Gizella
- Profession: Politician; writer; poet

Boldizsár Horvát (1 January 1822 – 28 October 1898) was a Hungarian politician, poet and novelist, who served as Minister of Justice between 1867 and 1871 in the government of Gyula Andrássy. He was a member of the Hungarian Academy of Sciences and the Kisfaludy Society.

In 1991, a street in northern Zugló, or Budapest's fourteenth district, was named in his honour.

Political offices
Preceded by Sebő Vukovics	Minister of Justice; 1867–1871	Succeeded by István Bittó
