= Deák Ferenc Bilingual High School =

- Deák Ferenc Gimnázium

Location
- 118-120 József Attila sugárút Szeged, H-6723; Hungary; 46°16′12″N 20°09′24″E

Information
- School type: gymnasium
- Established: 1988; 38 years ago
- Principal: Faragó Klára
- Gender: Co-educational
- Age: 14 to 18
- Enrollment: approx. 850 (2026)
- Language: Hungarian, English
- Publication: iDeák
- Website: deákf-szeged.sulinet.hu (in Hungarian)

The Deák Ferenc Bilingual High School (Hungarian: Deák Ferenc Gimnázium, lit. 'Ferenc Deák Gymnasium') is a public, co-educational secondary school located on József Attila sugárút in Szeged in Csongrád-Csanád, Hungary. Founded in 1988, the school teaches through Hungarian and English. As of 2026, the school had approximately 850 pupils enrolled.

== School structure ==
It is the youngest secondary educational institution in the city of Szeged. From the beginning, language education served as the main focus of the school in addition to its mission to provide a multifunctional place amidst its surroundings of panel housing estates, hence it leases out the Theater Hall—which can be opened together with the Atrium—for various cultural programs. The school has been participating in the debate forum called European Classes since 1997, it is the member of the initiative PUSCH (Schools: Partners of the Future), and that of the DSD program since 2008. The rate of acceptance to higher education is 89-90%.

Students within the Hungarian-English bilingual program have a higher number of classes in English. Furthermore, for them, the language of education concerning mathematics, biology, geography and history (both Hungarian and world history) is English. Throughout their four years of learning, these courses are complemented by a special English conversation class with native speakers, and by the same token a so-called civilization class is offered from 11th grade. The school has a wide range of international connections, thus bilingual students (along with those of the special English program) and students of the special German program have the opportunity to participate in exchange programs with Brooks School in North Andover, United States, and with Eleonorenschule in Darmstadt, Germany, respectively.

== History ==
By the end of the 1980s, the leadership of Szeged had realized the altering tendencies that higher and higher percentages of students ought to be provided secondary education. In the spirit of the aforementioned situation, the Executive Committee of the Municipal Council of Szeged stipulated in 1985 that a new high school be built in the area marked by Anyagod Street and József Attila Boulevard (22,740 yd^{2}), of which István Novák, architect of Csomiterv Ltd. was appointed. He designed a multifunctional school with 24 class-rooms, with abilities to be used for various occasions, and with enrollment capacity of 800-1000 students. On August 1, 1988, the general contractor announced the end of construction, and the faculty started to move in.

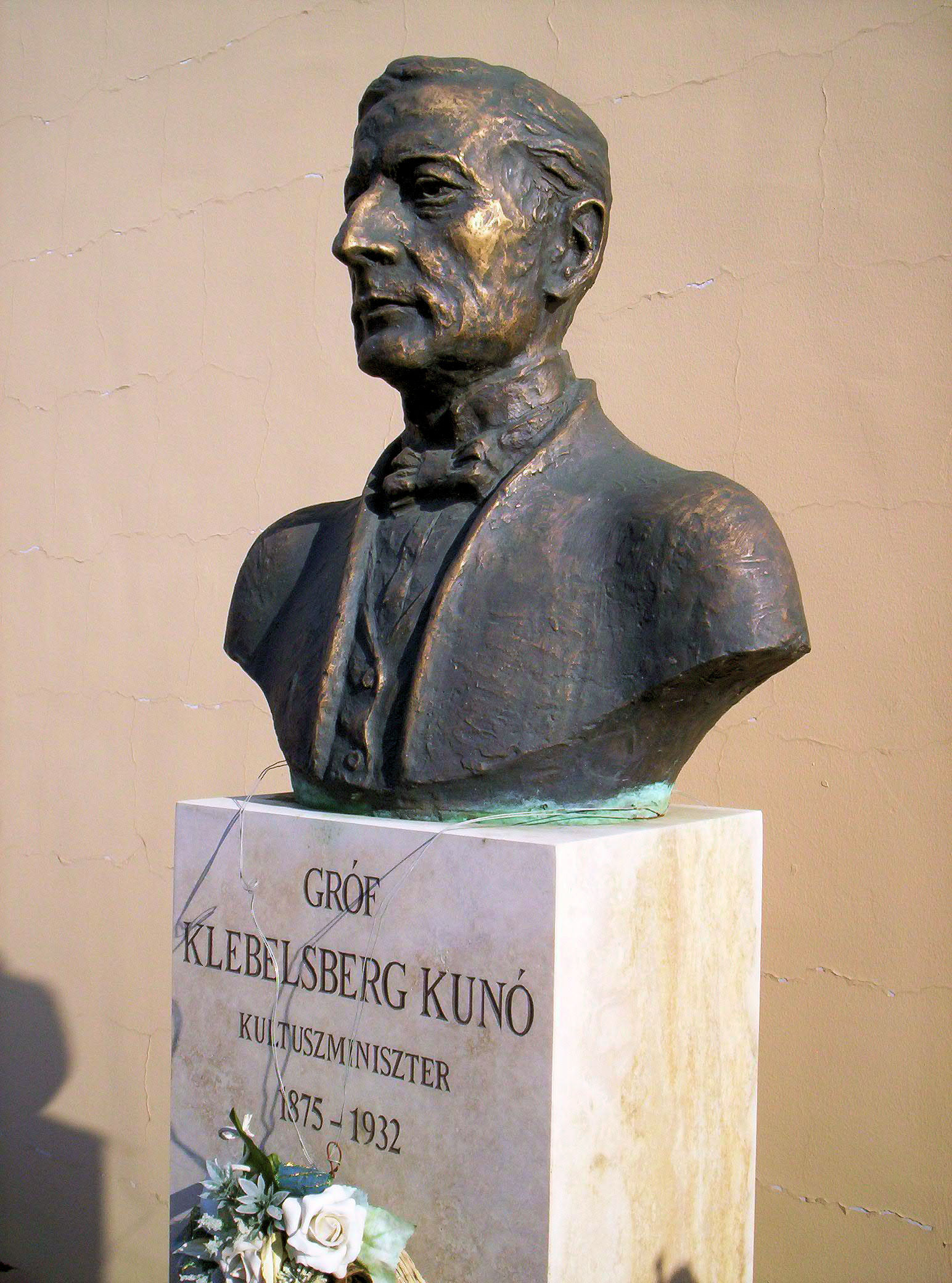
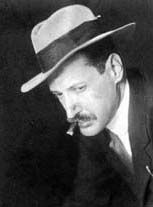
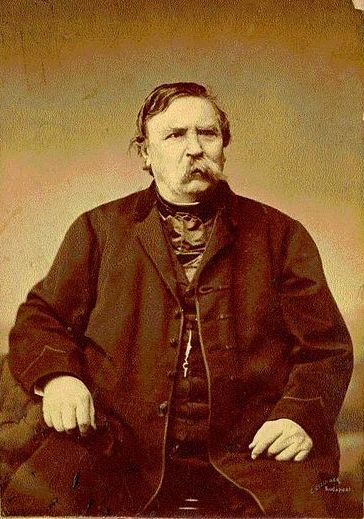
"…the person after whom the school should be named was chosen by the Board of Teachers from among three possibilities: Kunó Klebensberg, Mihály Károlyi and Ferenc Deák…"

Three choices were given to the Board of Teachers to decide whom the school should be named after :

- Kunó Klebensberg who served as Member of Parliament for Szeged from 1920, Minister of the Interior and later on as Minister of Religion and Culture
- Mihály Károlyi, the first Prime Minister then President of the First Republic of Hungary
- Ferenc Deák, the so-called Sage of the Nation who orchestrated the Austro-Hungarian Compromise of 1867.

Count Kunó Klebensberg was soon declared out of the contest given the difficult pronunciation of his name and it eventually ended in a draw between the two other alternatives. Dr. László Kovács, the first principal (1987–1992), avowed—with the intention to resolve the situation—that his vote counts as two, hence the name Deák Ferenc Bilingual High School came into being. It was a decision that the Municipal Council did not want to accept, therefore the principal applied to Tibor Czibere, the then Minister of Education of the People's Republic of Hungary for help. Not until this event did the name become official.

Given the institution's focus on foreign languages, it was Mark Palmer, former United States Ambassador to Hungary (1986–1990) who was asked to inaugurate the school. In the year of the opening, Deák Ferenc Bilingual High School and the Embassy of the United States Budapest cooperated on a weekly basis so that even Frank Press, President of the U.S. National Academy of Sciences paid a visit in the school; what is more it was in the same year when the exchange program between Deák and Brooks School in Massachusetts was launched. The school continued to keep its connections to foreign affairs later on as well, hence upon the visit of the German Ambassador to Hungary, every student was provided free visas to the late West-Germany.

The first principal, Dr. László Kovács considered equipping the school and filling it with teachers and students to be his prime duty. During his principalship, he procured 64 televisions, two class-rooms of computers, 42 sets of skiing equipment and installed a studio so as to enrich the school. He employed several former teachers from Ságvári High School while the students were from Radnóti Miklós High School, Tömörkény István High School and Ságvári High School. Even though these students started in their old schools, they pursued their education in the new institution. Accordingly, the first two Hungarian-English bilingual classes spent their freshman year in Radnóti; however, under the aegis of Deák's new Board of Teachers. In those days, there were only three foreign languages besides English which could be learned—Italian, Spanish and German—prior to the introduction of French in 1989. In 1991 the school launched its "6-year high school" program (Note: In the 1990s numerous Hungarian secondary educational institutions started to offer a"6-year high school" program according to which parents were allowed to send their children to high school in 6th grade. For more informations see: Education in Hungary) onto which Deák focused more and more attention; moreover, in the very same decade the palette of education was complemented with a new program in which students had a higher number of literature and history lessons and with special language programs.

Principal Dr. József Kovács preeminently aimed at maintaining the "6-year high school" program. During his principalship the institute was a nationally noted high school reaching number 13 on the list of best high schools in Hungary and later on as well it was in the best 40. With the financial support of Soros Foundation, Deák was able to furnish its first computer laboratory and in 1995 it established another classroom with an up-to-date network of computers.

In the academic term of 1998/1999, the new Computing and Informatics Program became available along with the Special German one, which were followed by the Special Spanish Program in 2001 and the Special English program in 2004. Deák Ferenc Bilingual High School celebrated its 20th anniversary in 2008, commemorating which a week-long set of events was organized in Deák Ferenc Bilingual High School.

== Namesake ==
It is named after Ferenc Deák, a famous 19th-century Hungarian politician who is also known as the Sage of the Nation.

== Curriculum ==
=== Hungarian-English Bilingual program ===
Distinguishing code	01
Length of study	4 years

In the Hungarian-English Bilingual program—present since the opening of the school—has started among the first such programs in Hungary. Students in this program learn English on an advanced level throughout their four years of high school, and have special English Conversation classes with either American or British native speakers so as to practice the language orally and to improve conversation skills. Five subjects are taught in English:

- Mathematics, History (9th-12th grade)
- Geography (9th-10th grade)
- Biology (10th-12th grade)
- Civilization (11th-12th grade) (Note: During Civilization classes students learn about the history, literature, geography, administration, political and every-day life of Anglophone countries around the globe.)

Admissions to the bilingual program generally happens on a regional scale and requires the central entrance examination to be complemented with an oral examination in English. Eleni Tsakopoulos Kounalakis, U.S. Ambassador to Hungary visited Deák Ferenc Bilingual High School in November 12, 2010, and expressed encomiums on the remarkable fluency the program provides for students.

Pupils in the Hungarian-English Bilingual program and those of the Special English program have the opportunity to apply for exchange with Brooks School which started in 1989 and in the frames of which approximately four students are given scholarship to this private school of North Andover, Massachusetts. Following this near three month exchange, the participants have to host the American students coming to Hungary.

The same groups of students can apply for European Classes, an English language debate forum in which the institution has been participating since 1994. Participants—imitating the European Parliament —discuss topics concerning the continent's economical and political hardships while connecting to other institutions' regularly attending students from Romania, Denmark and Germany thus becoming acquainted with their cultures.

=== Special German program ===
Distinguishing code	05
Length of study	4 years

The Special German program is in accordance with the German DSD program (Deutsches Sprachdiplom) meaning after the end of their secondary education, students receive their language certificates from the German Federal Republic herself, which enables them not to have to be required to take a special German entrance exam when applying to a German university. The objective of the aforementioned program is to ensure a solid background in the knowledge of the German language and culture for students of non-German school, which later on could help them to acquire job and to pursue their education in Germanophone countries. Pupils learn German on an advanced level; and furthermore, they are aided by a native teacher to practice orally and to develop high fluency.

=== Soccer Academy program ===
Distinguishing code	10
Length of study	4 years

The special class of Soccer Academy is consistent with the general curriculum of sport schools and was born to provide a sufficient basis for its players who wish not to solely concentrate on their sport achievements but on their advanced education as well. The conception of the program arose in the spring of 2007—nevertheless, such initiatives were considered in the past as well— thus in September 2008 the school enrolled its first class in this program. The team received the titles "Best Association Football Team of The City of Szeged" and "Best Association Football Team of Csongrád County"; moreover, they came second in the semi-final of the National Student Olympics within the same year. Admission to this program generally happens on a regional scale during which applicant have to take the central entrance examination along with a sport aptitude test. In order to guarantee the level of professional training, Deák Ferenc Bilingual High School called for tighter cooperation with Tisza Volán SC Youth Division and KÉSZ Soccer Academy Endowment.

=== Motion Picture Culture and Media program ===
Distinguishing code	09
Length of study	4 years

It is the declared aim of Deák Ferenc Bilingual High School to provide a qualification for students enrolled in this program with the help of which they can examine the stream of information of the contemporary era through a critical perspective. Apart from the national entrance examination, applicants to this program are required to go through an oral examination for which they have to prepare from five classical films—chosen from the list stipulated by the school—and from two arbitrary ones. They are expected to examine these from both a narrative point-of-view and from film technological point-of-view as well; moreover, the application procedure includes a discussion concerning media history and contemporary media events. Concerning the National Secondary School Academic Competition, students of the Motion Picture Culture and Media program have always reached the Top 9 with their project works between the academic years of 2004/2005 and 2009/2010.

=== Other programs ===
	Distinguishing code
International studies program	02
International studies, economy program	03
Special English program	04
Ordinary program (Note: Student enrolled in the Ordinary Program learn both of their foreign languages on an advanced level during their four years of secondary education.)	07
Special Spanish program	08

== Achievements ==
Deák Ferenc Bilingual High School features among the Best 60 or Best 70 in the nation with the rate of acceptance to higher education of 89-90 %. 90-95 % of students of the Hungarian-English Bilingual program take their complex advanced language examinations by the end of their senior year; what is more, 67% of all students do so as well. Concerning other foreign languages, 70-80 % of the whole enrollment takes language exams from one or two languages by the end of 12th grade.

Results of the school leaving examination (2009)
Subjects	Percent Average (Standard Level)	Grade Average (Standard Level)	Percent Average (Advanced Level)	Grade Average (Advanced Level)
Mathematics	65,90	3,88	82,00	5,00
Hungarian Literature and Grammar	75,63	4,39	52,87	3,94
History	66,91	3,97	60,12	4,12
English language	84,37	4,74	81,67	4,90
German language	76,03	4,17	80,00	5,00
Biology	74,00	4,33	61,60	4,60
Physics	59,22	3,56	-	-
Chemistry	78,40	4,40	82,33	5,00
Informatics	67,93	4,04	-	-
Geography	77,79	4,64	65,00	5,00

Results of the school leaving examination (2010)
Subjects	Percent Average (Standard Level)	Grade Average (Standard Level)	Percent Average (Advanced Level)	Grade Average (Advanced Level)
Mathematics	63,55	3,71	71,00	5,00
Hungarian Literature and Grammar	74,45	4,31	57,17	3,83
History	72,88	4,26	63,14	4,57
English language	81,86	4,64	77,28	4,97
German language	88,56	4,92	93,33	5,00
Biology	70,12	4,03	60,36	4,18
Physics	73,33	4,33	77,00	5,00
Chemistry	71,86	4,00	73,00	5,00
Informatics	73,00	4,21	-	-
Geography	82,50	4,83	-	-

The number of students leaving the school (A) and the number of failures (B) between 2008 and 2010
Year	A	B
2008/2009.	28	3
2009/2010.	22	3

== Partnerships ==
List of schools with which Deák Ferenc Bilingual High School has had continuing exchanges or where the institution pays regular visits so as to enhance its international connection:

=== Exchange programs ===
School	Location
Brooks School	North Andover, United States
Eleonorenschule Darmstadt	Darmstadt, Germany
Tamási Áron High School	Odorheiu Secuiesc, Romania
Covenant School	Charlotteville, United States
Gummersbach	Germany

=== Other connections ===
Organization	Location
Fulbright Association	United States
Educational Services International	California, United States
British Council	Kingdom of England
Goethe Institution	Federal Republic of Germany
U.S. Embassy in Budapest	United States, Republic of Hungary

== Student life ==
=== Traditions ===
==== Deák Olympics ====
Deák Olympics is an annual academic competition among all the different grades from all subjects taught in the school; however, an artistic competition and an essay writing are also part of the events as well. Sport competitions are likewise organized—in the frame of this event—in concordance with the students' wishes. Following semi-finals and finals, the result announcement ceremony is due to a day without teaching in the spring. On the day of Deák Olympics itself, presentations, film screenings, tea house, minor competitions (such as the student-teacher chess or poker tournaments) or exhibitions are held in the school before the result announcement ceremony. The event is organised in order to improve the school community and the cohesion within it.

==== Szalagtűző and szalagavató ====
The szalagtűző (literally ribbon pinning ceremony) and szalagavató (literally ribbon inauguration ceremony) are traditions in an abundant number of Hungarian high schools during which senior students are given a ribbon symbolizing the end of their secondary education. In Deák Ferenc Bilingual High School the two traditions are not commemorated on the same day but form two distinctive ceremonies. During the szalagtűző, students of the penultimate class pin a ribbon onto each 12th-grader which is then followed by the speech of the principal, speech of the representatives of the students left behind and that of seniors uttered by a member of them accompanied by musical performances.

Following the szalagtűző, the szalagavató ball is organized in the Atrium of the school for which seniors perform English and Viennese waltzes in addition to their respective class dances of choice and the teacher-student dance (dance couples are formed by student requesting a member of the faculty to dance) which is an English waltz too as a rule. As result of a new, peculiar initiative, dances are not accompanied recorded music, but by live music provided by the Deák Big Band. As soon as all the dances end, students form into lines and the principal proposes a toast from atop the stairs of the Atrium following which the students clink glasses with each other and with their teachers. The dinner afterwards is organized in the building of the school as well; student and their family sit around tables placed in different class-rooms while the Theater Hall functions as a disco. The ball is concluded by leaving the institution for a remote after-party.

==== Deák Inner-County Translation Competition ====
Deák Ferenc Bilingual High School has been staging its inner-county translation competition since 1997 which is due to the idea of the then leader of the English Department, Ms. Ildikó Sóti. It consists of Germanic-language translating competitions, from Hungarian to English and German, besides those of Romance-languages like French and Italian language\Italian. During the contest, texts of various styles and topics (such as literary or publicistic works) are to be interpreted.

==== Freshman Week and Freshman Ball ====
The Freshman Ball (called Stork Ball in Hungarian (Note: First graders in Hungarian secondary and tertiary educational institutions are referred to as storks in Hungarian slang, hence the expression Stork Ball to denote the Freshman Ball.)) occurs in November each year following the Fall Term Break. During this ceremony, new graders are officially inaugurated as students of Deák Ferenc Bilingual High School. Proceeding this event, is the Freshman Week (called Stork Week in Hungarian) challenging the freshmen with creative and humorous tasks each day. Enhancing the evolution of cohesion among new students, each first grader class have to perform a class dance of arbitrary style and choreography. The ball commences with the greeting of new students and with the introduction of the jury which decides over the best class dance. Following the dances comes the stork oath; meanwhile, the jury totalizes the points. The class which wins is granted a trophy and the right to organize the event in the subsequent year. The ball is ended with a disco held in the Theater Hall and with the concert of different school bands in the dining hall.

==== Goodbye Ceremony ====
The Goodbye Ceremony is not held on the same day as the graduation but it does represent a momentous event in the life of the school which consists of the solo and joint performances of teachers and form masters' of senior classes including both musical and spoken word performances.

==== Christmas Soiree ====
Deák Ferenc Bilingual High School has been organizing its annual Christmas Soiree since 1992. During the event, which is held in the Theatre Hall, representatives of the Student Body, along with those of the faculty, present their respective and joint performances as well. This event has been organised since the opening of the institution.

==== Wreath laying at the statue of Deák ====
Commemorating the statesman after whom the school has been named, the ninth graders lay a wreath at the statue of Ferenc Deák on Széchenyi Square each year on the day of his birth, October 17. Apart from this event, students also pay tribute to him—on the day of his death—in the National Pantheon which is found on Dóm Square in front of the Votive Church of Szeged.

==== Freshmen Day ====
In its Pedagogical Program, Deák Ferenc Bilingual High School emphasizes the education of community life to be a most accentuated issue due to which the institution organizes an annual Freshman Day in the Ópusztaszer National Heritage Park so as to enhance the formation of class communities. During this day, freshmen have to participate in various team sports and other team competitions.

== Campus ==
István Novák—in order to create a multifunctional institution—designed a spacious school with well-illuminated areas, thus developing an environment where students could spend their extracurricular time. The gymnasium (which can have up to three sections with the help of divider curtains), the library (standing at 20000 volumes), the spacious buffet, the modern studio and the Atrium were all born corresponding to this conception; opened together with the Theater Hall, the former one is able to host the whole school. Dr. László Kovács, the future first principal, modified the original plans: he had the wall separating the Atrium and the Theater Hall changed to a movable one; he made the gymnasium suitable for installing tennis or volleyball nets; what is more, he arrangement of lockers was also developed by him. Besides these facilities, the original plans featured a short course swimming pool as well where the school wished to have swimming lessons and competitions alike, but it was never built. The interior of the building is the work of Designer Mihály Szekeres, the winner of 1985 Mihály Munkácsy Award, while Miklós Borsos' work can be examined above the main entrance. The school itself is a reinforced concrete structure using 4-5 different panel elements for the exterior, since the then Leadership of Szeged had the elements ordered from a concrete panel factory.

== Sources, notes ==
Sources are in Hungarian
