= Opposition Party (Hungary) =

19th century Hungarian political party

Opposition Party Ellenzéki Párt
- Historical leaders: Lajos Batthyány; Lajos Kossuth
- Founded: 15 March 1847
- Dissolved: 1849
- Succeeded by: Address Party; Resolution Party
- Headquarters: Budapest, Kingdom of Hungary
- Ideology: Liberalism; Radicalism; Nationalism
- Political position: Left-wing
- Colours: Red

The Opposition Party (Hungarian: Ellenzéki Párt, pronounced [ˈɛlːɛnzeːki ˈpaːrt]) was a political party that came to prominence during the 1848–49 revolution in Hungary. By contemporary political standards, they represented the far-left in the Hungarian parliament. Its leading political figure was Lajos Kossuth.

== History ==
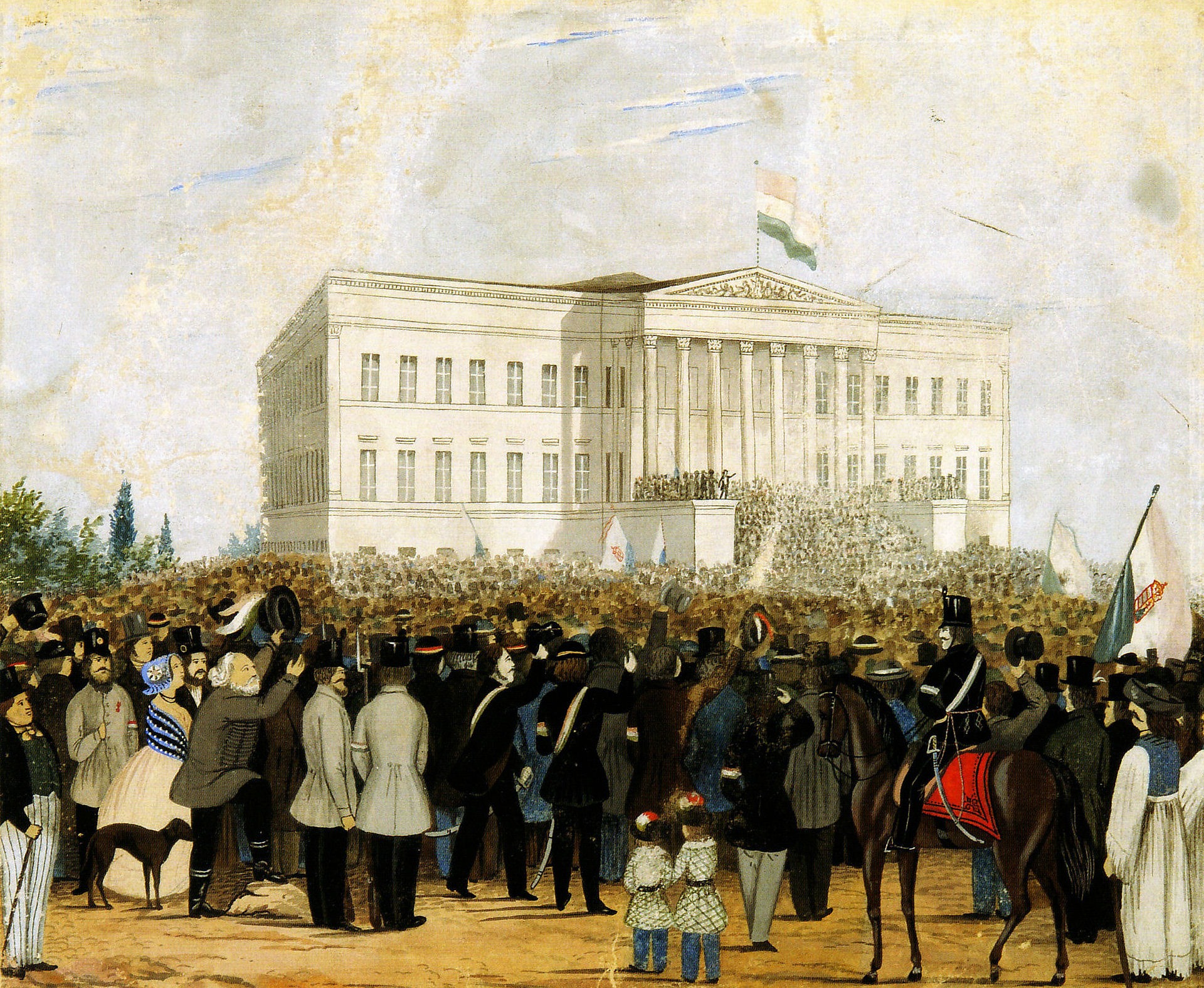
Revolutionary crowd in front of the Hungarian National Museum on 15 March 1848

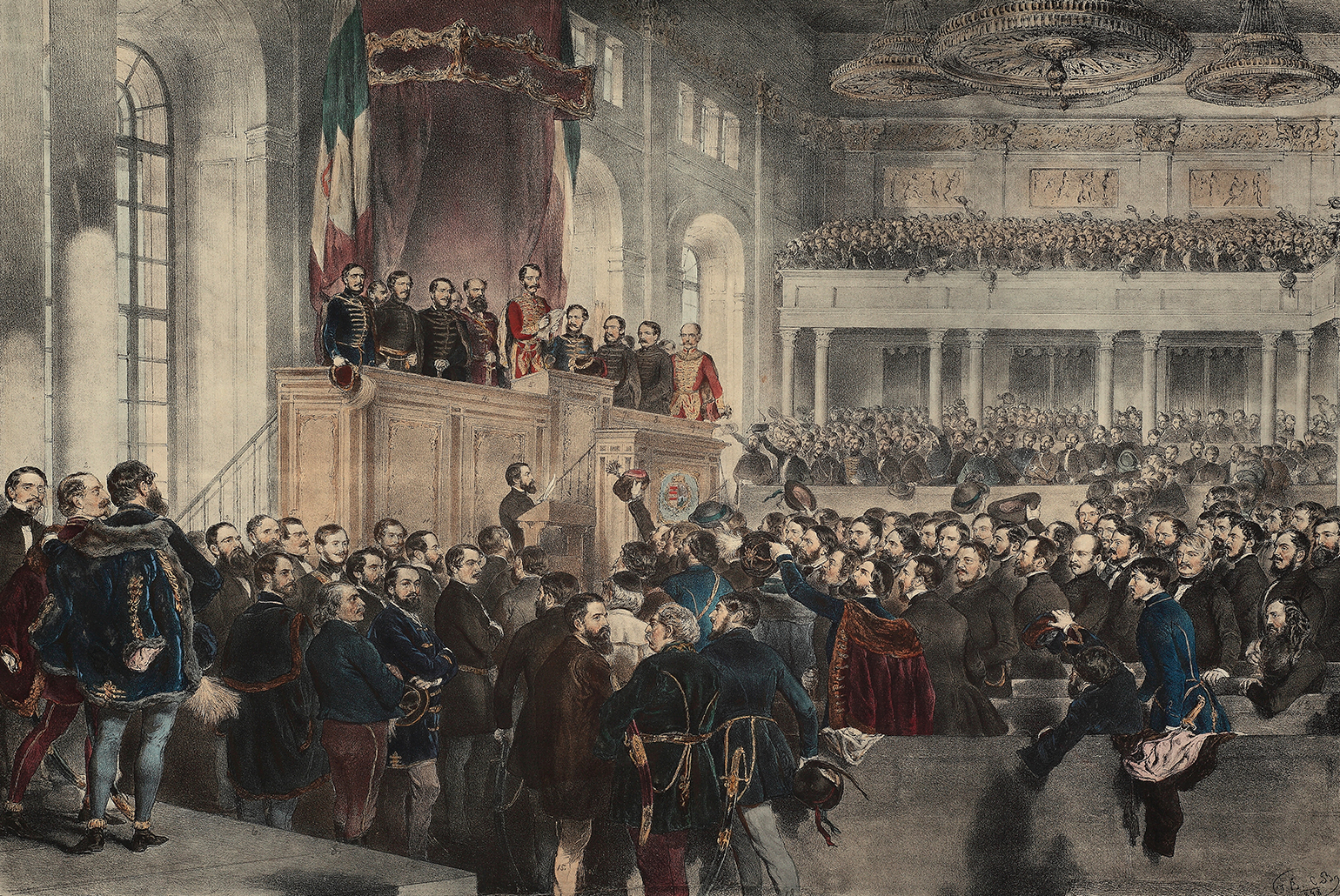
The first 'popular representational' National Assembly in Pest in 1848

During the Hungarian Reform Era, several opposition circles appeared. Among the first was the National Circle from which later the Pest Circle split. When the two organizations newly merged, they formed the Opposition Circle which can be seen as the predecessor of the Opposition Party.

For the elections of the National Assembly in 1847, it was needed to establish a new political force. The Conservative Party was created in November 1846 by the Habsburg-loyal members of the National Assembly. This gave the final impuls to the József Eötvös-led centralists and the municipalists to aside controversies. After the preliminary party formation meeting on 15 November 1846, they officially announced the creation of the Opposition Party on the 15 March 1847 in Pest at the Opposition Conference. Lajos Batthyány was named as the president of the party.

On the party formation meeting, Lajos Kossuth read out the party program that he had written. At the end of the meeting, the famous Hungarian poet Sándor Petőfi declaimed his poem A nép nevében (In the name of the people). Ferenc Deák made the final version of the party program and named it Ellenzéki Nyilatkozat (Opposition Statement) which was accepted by the members.

After the party's victory in the 1848 March Revolution, it became power holder. The first government in the history of Hungary was formed from which the prime minister, Lajos Batthyány and five other ministers were members of the Opposition Party (Minister of Justice Ferenc Deák, Minister of the Interior Bertalan Szemere, Minister of Education József Eötvös, Minister of Finance Lajos Kossuth, Minister of Agriculture Gábor Klauzál). Two other ministers, István Széchenyi and Lázár Mészáros were independent and Pál Esterházy was a member of the Conservative Party.

Until the end of the summer, most of the important political rolls were in the hands of the members of the Opposition Party: they were in the ruling party and also in its opposition. The breakline lyed between the ruling moderates and the opposition formed by the radicals. To the latter belonged among others László Teleki, Pál Nyáry and László Madarász.

In 1849, the Conservative Party merged into the Opposition Party.

After the defeated revolution and the passive resistance of the 1850s, the newly revived Opposition party split into several directions. While Deák and Eötvös accepted the Ausgleich and they were the leaders of that on the Hungarian side, Kossuth and his followers opposed it. They wanted complete independence and rejected the Austro-Hungarian dualism.

The followers of Ferenc Deák established the Address Party and the followers of Lajos Kossuth created the Resolution Party in 1861.

== List of notable members of the Opposition Party ==
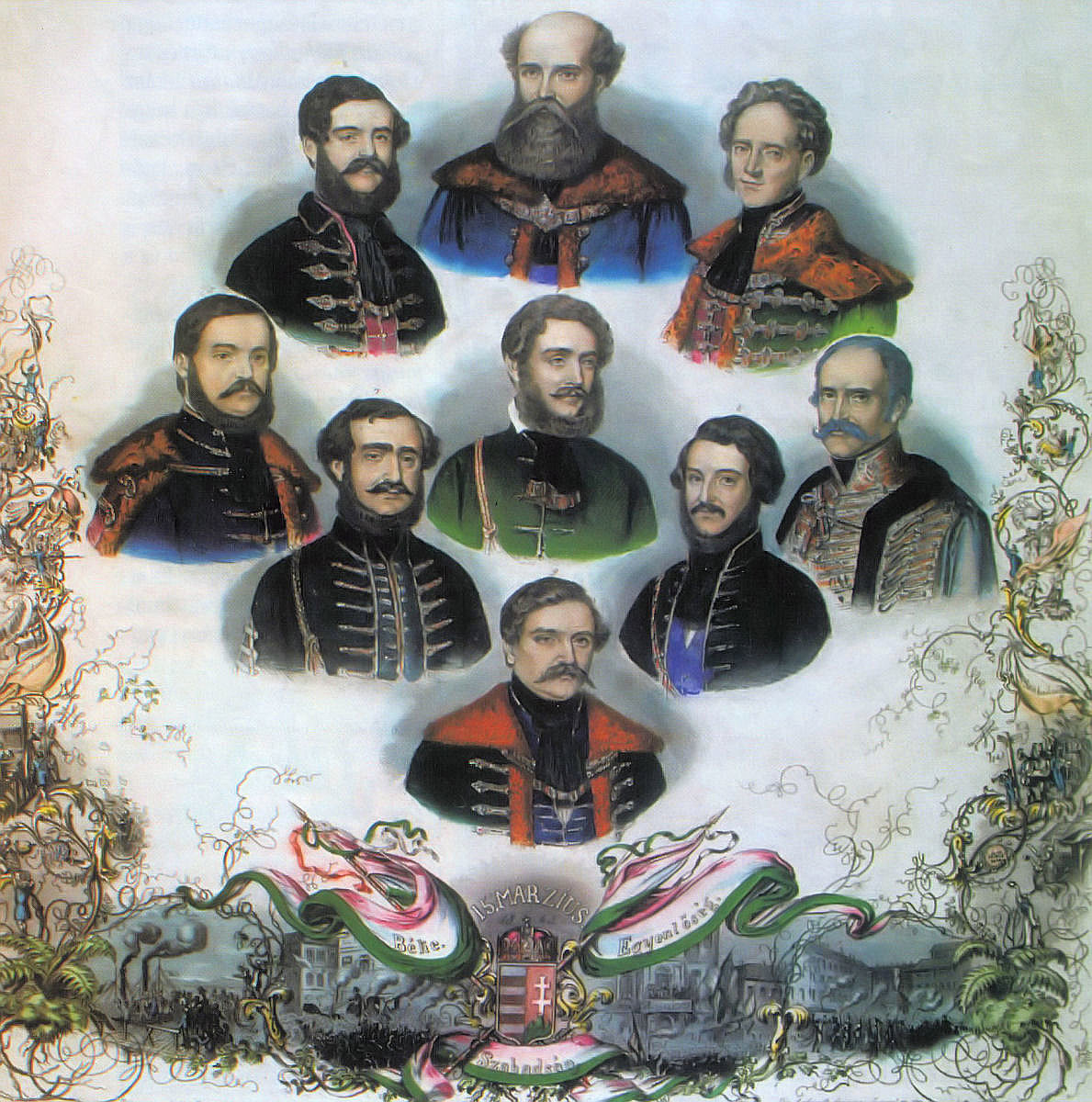
The first government of Hungary, the Batthyány Government (1st row:Lajos Batthyány 2nd row:Bertalan Szemere, Pál Esterházy 3rd row:Gábor Klauzál, Lajos Kossuth, Lázár Mészáros, 4th row:István Széchenyi, József Eötvös 5th row:Ferenc Deák)

- Lajos Batthyány, Prime Minister of Hungary
- Lajos Kossuth, Prime Minister of Hungary
- Károly Andrássy
- Pál Almásy, Speaker of the House of Representatives
- József Bajza, Hungarian poet
- Kázmér Batthyány, Minister of Foreign Affairs
- László Csány, Minister of Public Works and Transport
- Ferenc Deák ("The Wise Man of the Nation"), Hungarian statesman, Minister of Justice, founder of the Address Party and the Deák Party
- Menyhért Lónyay, Prime Minister of Hungary
- Gábor Klauzál, Minister of Agriculture, Industry and Trade
- István Gorove, Minister of Agriculture, Industry and Trade, later Minister of Public Works and Transport, and leader of the Liberal Party
- László Palóczy, Speaker of the House of Representatives
- Zsigmond Perényi, Speaker of the House of Magnates
- Sándor Petőfi, Hungarian poet, liberal revolutionary
- Ferenc Pulszky
- Bertalan Szemere, Hungarian poet, Prime Minister of Hungary
- László Teleki, later leader of the Resolution Party
- Ágoston Trefort, Minister of Religion and Education, President of the Hungarian Academy of Sciences
- Mihály Vörösmarty, Hungarian poet, dramatist
- Sebő Vukovics

== Literature ==
- Dezsényi Béla: A Nemzeti Kör a negyvenes évek irodalmi és hírlapi mozgalmaiban. In: Irodalomtörténeti Közlemények. 1953. p. 163-204.
- Deregnyei (Kossuth Lajos): A magyar politikai pártok értelmezése
