= Lieutenancy Council =

The Lieutenancy Council (Latin: Consilium regium locumtenentiale; Hungarian: Helytartótanács), also known as Viceregal Council or Lord Lieutenancy, was a leading governmental institution in the Kingdom of Hungary between 1723 and 1848. Headed by the Palatine (or viceroy), or by the lord lieutenant, the council reported directly to the king. With the exception of the judiciary, and the administration of military and fiscal affairs, all governmental affairs fell within its jurisdiction. Initially, the council had twenty-two members, appointed by the king from among the Catholic prelates and nobleman.

== Sources ==
- Cartledge, Bryan (2011) [2006]. The Will to Survive: A History of Hungary. Hurst & Company. ISBN 978-1-84904-112-6.
- Haselsteiner, Horst (1994) [1990]. "Cooperation and Confrontation between Rulers and the Noble Estates, 1711–1790". In Sugar, Peter F.; Hanák, Péter; Frank, Tibor (eds.). A History of Hungary. Indiana University Press. pp. 138–173. ISBN 0-253-20867-X.
- Kontler, László (1999). Millennium in Central Europe: A History of Hungary. Atlantisz Publishing House. ISBN 963-9165-37-9.
