= Resolution Party =

Resolution Party Határozati Párt
- Historical leaders: László Teleki
- Founded: 1861
- Dissolved: 1861
- Preceded by: Opposition Party; Peace Party
- Succeeded by: Left Centre
- Headquarters: Budapest, Kingdom of Hungary
- Ideology: Classical liberalism Radical liberalism '49 ideology
- Political position: Left-wing

The Resolution Party (Hungarian: Határozati Párt) was one of the two political groups of the National Assembly of 1861 in Hungary. The group was led by Count László Teleki.

== Etymology and Ideology ==
The name "Resolution Party" is directly related to the ideological divides within Hungarian politics at the time. In 1861, when the Hungarian Diet was assembled, the two main parties, the Resolution Party and the Address Party disagreed on how to communicate their grievances over Franz Joseph recognizing himself as King of Hungary. The Address Party of Deák sought to address Franz Joseph while the Resolution Party sought to pass a resolution rejecting his claim. While this detail of communication might seem trivial, it was ultimately built upon the major ideological differences between the two parties, between the ideals of autonomy versus independence, between constitutional monarchy versus republicanism and democracy. Most fundamentally, it showed the difference between reformism and independence, with Deák advocating a constitutional challenge to Franz Joseph's declaration, while the Resolution Party merely sought to condemn it without recognizing the authority of the Habsburgs
