= Sebő Vukovics =

Hungarian politician

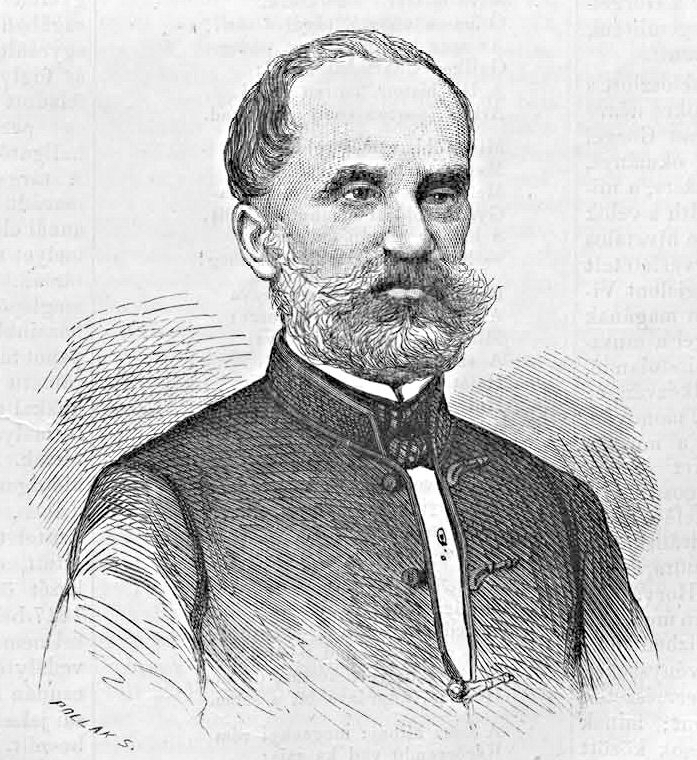

Minister of Justice of Hungary
- In office 2 May 1849 – 11 August 1849
- Preceded by: Ferenc Deák
- Succeeded by: Boldizsár Horvát

Personal details
- Born: 20 July 1811 Fiume, Illyrian Provinces
- Died: 19 November 1872 (aged 61) London, United Kingdom of Great Britain and Ireland
- Party: Opposition Party
- Spouse: Erzsébet Dadányi de Gyülvész
- Children: Mária; Gábor
- Profession: politician

Sebő Vukovics (Sava Vuković; 20 July 1811, Fiume – 19 November 1872, London) was a Hungarian politician of Serbian descent, who served as Minister of Justice in 1849 during the Hungarian Revolution of 1848.

== Biography ==
Sebő (Sebastian) Vukovics de Beregszo was born into a Serbian Orthodox landowning family in Temes County and learned to speak Hungarian as a second language in his adolescence, which reflected the assimilation process that sometimes took place particularly among those incorporated into Hungarian nobility. As a young lawyer, he was a member of Laszló Lovassy's Social Society.

At the age of 20, he commented that "our religion is a very dumb religion", signifying his preference for Protestantism. He also supported the voluntary conversion of Romanians into Protestantism. A proponent of Hungarian liberalism, Vukovics became a government commissioner of Banat, and then minister of justice in Bertalan Szemere's government. He was an ardent follower of Lajos Kossuth until the end of his life. Vukovics is considered to have been a pragmatic politician who understood the techniques of county and state bureaucracy. He also knew how to take a person to task—even though he always tried to avoid internal conflicts.

After the 1848 Revolution, the Hungarian commander of Serbian nationality General János Damjanich, with a dozen other high-ranking officers, was hanged by the Austrians, and Vukovics, rightfully, feared for his life. He was hiding from the authorities at the homes of the Menyhért Lónyay and Ervin Vladár families immediately after the Surrender at Világos. Vukovics and the Polish general, Józef Bem, fled into exile, first in France where he accompanied other exiles. Vukovics was sentenced to death in absentia by the Austrian crown.

He was a relation of the Queen Milena of Montenegro.

In 1851 he emigrated to the United Kingdom, but maintained contact with all the revolutionaries, particularly Kossuth to whom he wrote many letters, outlining two basic principles for the near future: independence of Hungary, and "complete democratic freedom with respect to politics, nationality, and religion." Vukovics insisted on the unity of historical Hungary. Therefore he did not give up Transylvania but did acknowledge the independence of Croatia, and recognized the establishment of the Voivodeship of Serbia and Banat of Temeschwar. Instead of a confederation he proposed an alliance with the neighbouring Danubian states,vis-à-vis Austria. Vukovics subordinated the nationality question to the issue of universal suffrage while "not keeping up any supremacy for the Hungarian nationality." Since the "central power" would decide only in national affairs, county autonomy could satisfy nationalities claims. The official languages in national affairs would be decided by the state, in county affairs by the county, and municipal affairs by the community.

He died in London on 19 November 1872.

In Novi Sad his father made a donation to found the Gymnasium Jovan Jovanović Zmaj, constructed in 1810.

Sebő Vukovics's memoirs were written while he was living in London. They were published in Budapest by politician Ferenc Besenyei, MP, in 1894.

Political offices
Preceded by Ferenc Deák	Minister of Justice; 1849	Succeeded by Boldizsár Horvát
