= László Teleki =

Hungarian writer and statesman

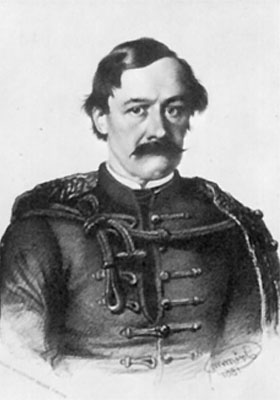

Count László Teleki IV de Szék (11 February 1811 – 8 May 1861) was a Hungarian writer and statesman. He is remembered as the author of the drama Kegyencz ("The Favourite", 1841). In older books in English he is given the name "Ladislas Teleky".

Teleki was born in Pest to László Teleki III and Johanna Mészáros. On his father's death in 1821 he was raised by his elder half-brother József Teleki (1790–1855). Throughout the 1830s he travelled through Europe. On returning to Hungary he became a politician, first in Transylvania (where his brother became governor) and then in the National Assembly, with a particular concern for the equitable representation of different nationalities within the Empire.

In 1848 came news of the revolution in Paris, and he travelled to Paris as envoy. The failure of the Hungarian revolution led to his banishment, and in 1851 he was sentenced to death in absentia. During the 1850s he lived in Switzerland and did what he could to assist Lajos Kossuth, despite their disagreements.

In November 1860 he travelled to Dresden under an assumed name in order to see the widow Auguszta Lipthay. He was arrested on 16 December by the Saxon police, and four days later was taken across the border into Austria where he was imprisoned until New Year's Day. After negotiation with the authorities, mediated by Emperor Franz Joseph, he was pardoned and permitted to return to Hungary on the condition that he gave up revolutionary politics and foreign travel.

On his return he received a hero's welcome, and immediately resumed his political activities, directing the activities of the Resolution Party (Határozati Párt), and insisting that the proposed reforms of 1848 be carried out without compromise. He committed suicide on 8 May, the night before a significant public debate with Ferenc Deák on the constitutional status of the Emperor, for reasons that are unclear. The tragic news, coming only a year after the death of István Széchenyi, demoralized and bewildered the public.

He was the dedicatee of Franz Liszt's Hungarian Rhapsody No. 2.
