= Address Party =

Address Party Felirati Párt
- Historical leaders: Ferenc Deák
- Founded: 1861
- Dissolved: 1865
- Preceded by: Opposition Party
- Succeeded by: Deák Party
- Headquarters: Budapest, Kingdom of Hungary
- Ideology: Liberalism '48 ideology

The Address Party (Hungarian: Felirati Párt) was one of the two political groups of the National Assembly of 1861 in Hungary. The group was led by Ferenc Deák. In 1865 the party was renamed to Deák Party. The Deák Party was succeeded by the Liberal Party which led Hungary until 1905.

== Etymology and Ideology ==
The name "Address Party" is directly related to the ideological divides within Hungarian politics at the time. In 1861, when the Hungarian Diet was assembled, the two main parties, the Address Party and the Resolution Party disagreed on how to communicate their grievances over Franz Joseph recognizing himself as King of Hungary. The Address Party of Deák sought to address Franz Joseph while the Resolution Party sought to pass a resolution rejecting his claim without communicating with him at all. While this detail of communication might seem trivial, it was ultimately built upon the major ideological differences between the two parties, between the ideals of autonomy versus independence, between constitutional monarchy versus republicanism and democracy. Most fundamentally, it showed the difference between reformism and independence, with Deák advocating a constitutional challenge to Franz Joseph's declaration, while the Resolution Party merely sought to condemn it without recognizing the authority of the Habsburgs
