= Ferenc Deák (politician) =

Hungarian politician (1803–1876)

Noble Ferenc Deák de Kehida
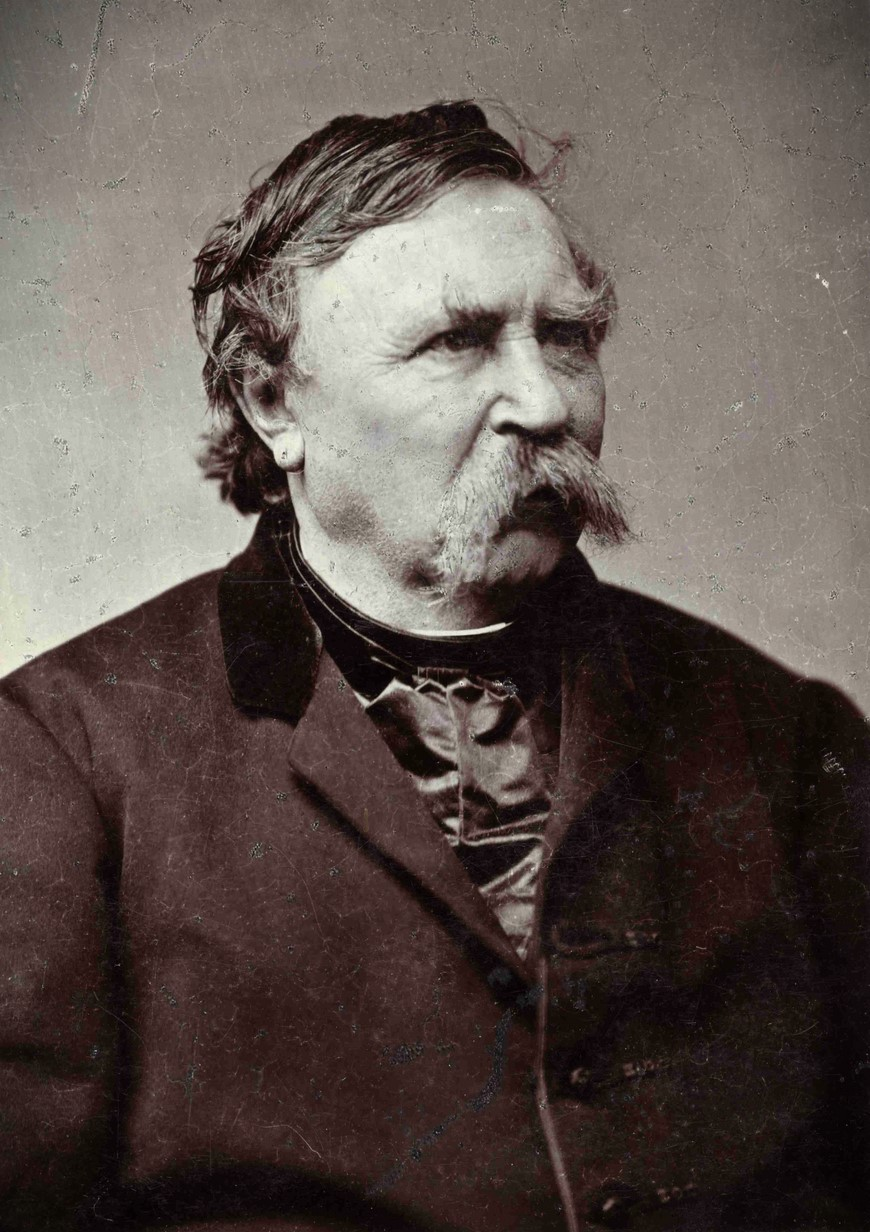
- Deák c. 1870

1st Minister of Justice of Hungary
- In office 17 March 1848 – 2 October 1848
- Prime Minister: Lajos Batthyány
- Preceded by: office established
- Succeeded by: Sebő Vukovics

Personal details
- Born: 17 October 1803 Söjtör, Kingdom of Hungary
- Died: 28 January 1876 (aged 72) Budapest, Austria-Hungary
- Resting place: Kerepesi Cemetery
- Party: Opposition Party (1847–1849); Address Party (1861); Deák Party (1865–1875); Liberal Party (1875–1876)
- Parent(s): Erzsébet Sibrik; Ferenc Deák

Ferenc Deák de Kehida (archaically English: Francis Deak, Croatian: Franjo Deák; 17 October 1803 – 28 January 1876) was a Hungarian statesman and Minister of Justice. He was known as "The Wise Man of the Nation" and one of the greatest figures of Hungary's liberal movement.

He was an instrumental contributor to a number of major events in Hungarian history, including passing and support of the April laws, the Austro-Hungarian Compromise of 1867 and the Hungarian Nationalities Law (1868). While generally supporting reformist policies, he was well recognized for finding and negotiating reasonable middle ground compromises between various extremist political factions throughout his career.

== Early life and law career ==
Born in Söjtör in the county of Zala, in southwestern Hungary, Deák belonged to an ancient noble family. His father was Ferenc Deák de Kehida (1761–1808), jurist, landowner, chief magistrate of the district (főszolgabíró) of Kapornak. His mother was the noble lady Erzsébet Sibrik de Szarvaskend et Óvár (1768–1803). He studied law, and became successively an advocate and notary.

His reputation was quickly established, and he first went into politics in 1833 when he attended the assembly of Pressburg (now Bratislava) as a replacement for his older brother Antal Deák de Kehida (1789–1842), beginning his career that would make him one of the most important personalities in the Hungarian politics and reforms of the 1840s. His name became known as a result of his involvement in the suit of Miklós Wesselényi and his success in declaring the Hungarian Assembly's right to create laws.

== Early activism ==
In 1836, Deák wrote and distributed a document about the causes that he supported without the permission of the censors; while it was confiscated, it was already widespread and made his name familiar in important circles. During the Diet of 1839–1840 Deák succeeded in bringing about an understanding between a reactionary government, then in want of money, and a Liberal opposition determined that the nation should have its political privileges respected. He was involved in the creation of the laws of that Diet, and became honorary member of the Hungarian Academy of Sciences. After the death of his brother in 1842, he liberated his serfs and voluntarily chose to pay taxes to show that he was sincere about his reforms. The abolition of the exemption of the nobles from all taxation in the Kingdom of Hungary and the liberation of serfs were some of the most important endeavours of the Reformist movement of the era. However, he refused to attend the Diet of 1843–44, supposedly due to strife surrounding his election.

== Political career ==
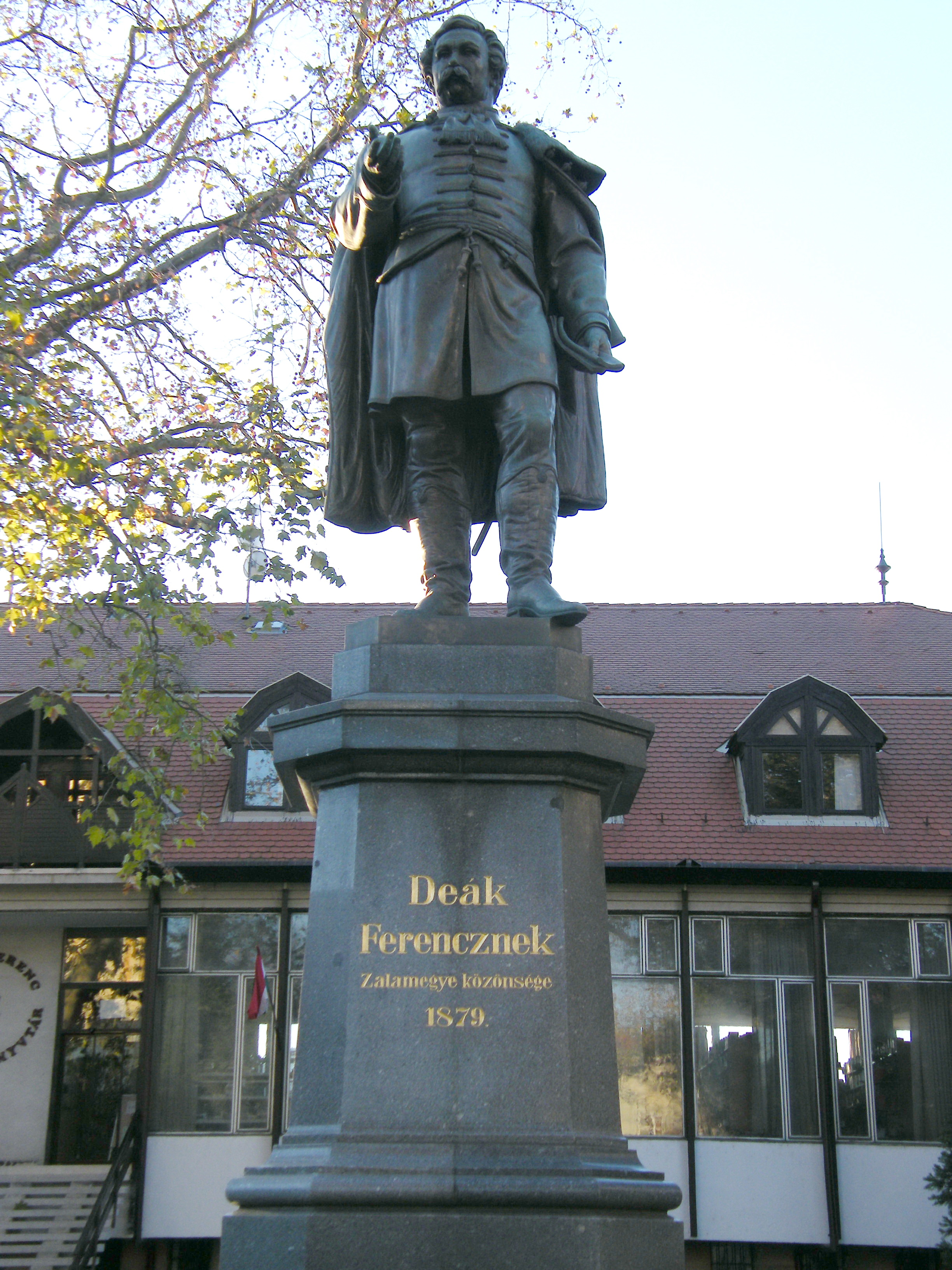
Statue of Deák in Zalaegerszeg

In 1846, after the bloody end of the Polish uprising in Galicia the reformers gained popularity and they released the "Ellenzéki nyilatkozat" (Manifesto of Opposition) under the name of Deák, while it was in fact created by Kossuth. During the Hungarian Revolution of 1848 against the Austrian Empire, Deák stayed calm and opposed violence as a political tool. In 1848 he accepted a position as Minister of Justice in the Batthyány Government, mostly to show his support of Lajos Batthyány.

Once part of the revolutionary government, Deák continued to urge moderation and made several trips to the court in Vienna, seeking a compromise between the Habsburg monarchy and Kossuth's Extremist Liberals. When his efforts failed, he resigned his ministerial post, but remained a Member of Parliament, defending the constitutional legitimacy of the April laws. He retired to his estate at Kehida before the end of the War of Independence, and took no further active part in events surrounding the revolution. An Austrian court martial acquitted him after Hungary's defeat.

Deák spent most of the 1850s in semi-retirement, tacitly supporting various national causes without engaging in active politics. He, however, refused to assume any public role, office or position, thus becoming an emblem of the so-called passive resistance. He sold his estate to István Széchenyi, and moved to Buda to become the de facto leader of Hungarian public life. He steered a middle course between advocates of a second anti-Habsburg uprising aligned with Kossuth, and pro-Austrian collaborationists. The crisis attending the Second Italian War of Independence in 1859, with strong Hungarian popular support for the Italian cause, returned him to active political life, although he opposed the initial Austrian reform proposals of 1860. In 1861, he became the leader of the group calling for a petition to the Austrian crown, throwing the onus for a settlement onto the Habsburg court. In response to his prompting, Franz Joseph I dismissed his current administration and called for a new parliament to negotiate the settlement. Deák led the committee tasked with drafting a formula, working alongside Kálmán Tisza and other prominent contemporary politicians. The Austro-Prussian War of 1866 came just as they had completed their work, but Deák resisted extremist pressure to reopen the issue.

Gradually, Deák moderated his views on Hungary's independence. Although he maintained that the April Laws were fully valid, he began taking the line that foreign affairs, defence and finance were "common" to both Austria and Hungary under the Pragmatic Sanction of 1713. He believed that a constitutional arrangement could be worked out to incorporate these ideas while still respecting Hungary's internal independence. He supported the "Compromise" (Ausgleich or Kiegyezés) of 1867, which incorporated these ideas, with all his strength, leading the delegation that signed the actual accord. Although he was the obvious choice as the first prime minister of the Hungarian half of the newly formed Austria-Hungary, he stood down in favour of Gyula Andrássy. After 1867 his health was weakened by continuous work and the attacks on him by disappointed radical patriots used up most of his strength. His reformist ideas were often rejected by Parliament.

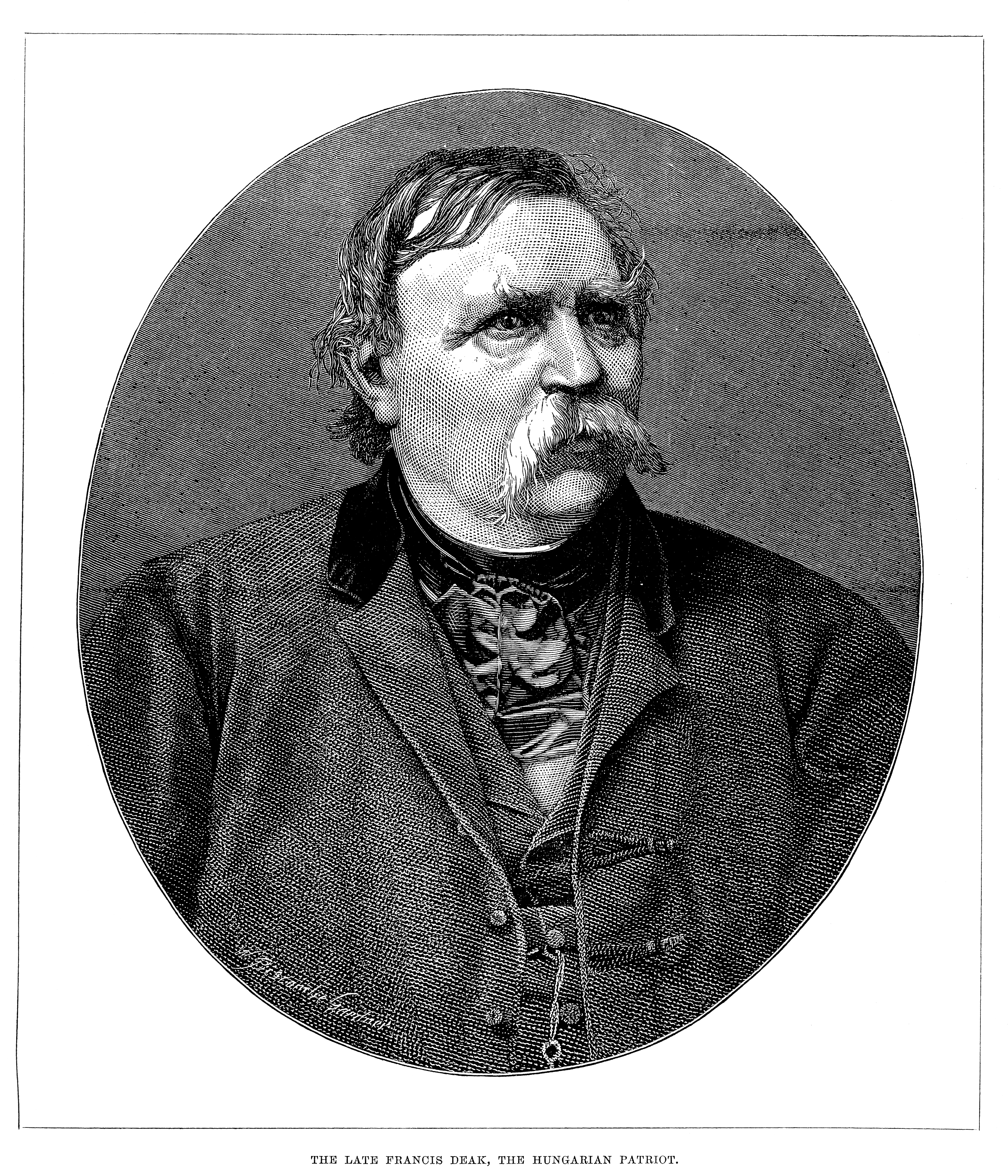
Ferenc Deák, as illustrated in his obituary in the Illustrated London News

He died on 28 January 1876 and was buried with great pomp. Parliament created a law to remember his excellent service and ordered that a statue be created from national donations. Today one of the central squares of Budapest, Deák Ferenc Square is named after him, which is where three of the four lines of the Budapest Metro come together.

== Legacy ==
- Deák Ferenc Bilingual High School was named after him.
- Deák Ferenc tér, a major transit hub in Budapest, and the adjacent metro station also named after him.
- He is portrayed on the 20,000 forint bank note (the highest denomination Hungarian currency note).
- Hungarian Post Office issued a postage stamp on 1 July 1932.
- He was often referred to as 'The wise man of the homeland'.
- Deák features prominently in the 1904 book The Resurrection of Hungary by the Irish nationalist Arthur Griffith, who argued that Deák's policy of non-recognition of the post-1848 Austrian administration in Hungary could be imitated by Irish nationalists to achieve self-rule within a British-Irish dual monarchy.

Political offices
Preceded by position established	Minister of Justice; 1848	Succeeded by Sebő Vukovics
