= April Laws =

Collection of laws modernizing the Kingdom of Hungary

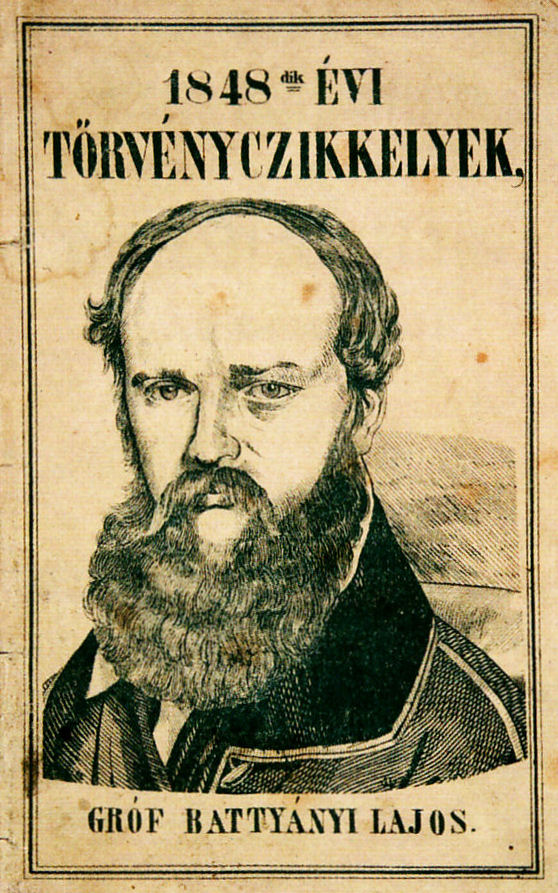
The April Laws with the portrait of prime minister Lajos Batthyány

The April Laws, also called March Laws, were a collection of laws legislated by Lajos Kossuth with the aim of modernizing the Kingdom of Hungary into a parliamentary democracy, nation state. The laws were passed by the Hungarian Diet in March 1848 in Pozsony (Pressburg, now Bratislava, Slovakia) and signed by king Ferdinand V at the Primate's Palace in the same city on 11 April 1848.

The April Laws utterly erased all privileges of the Hungarian nobility. In April 1848, Hungary became the third country of Continental Europe [after France (1791) and Belgium (1831)] to enact a law about democratic parliamentary elections. The new suffrage law (Act V of 1848) transformed the old feudal estates based parliament (Estates General) into a democratic representative parliament. This law offered the widest suffrage right in Europe at the time. The imperative program included Hungarian control of its popular national guard, national budget and Hungarian foreign policy, as well as the removal of serfdom.

In 1848, the new young Austrian monarch Francis Joseph I arbitrarily "revoked" the laws without any legal competence.

== Twelve Points ==
The conservatives, who generally stood in opposition to the majority of reforms, managed to retain a narrow advantage in the traditional feudal parliament. On the other hand, the reform-minded liberals found themselves divided in their support for either Széchenyi's or Kossuth's ideas. Immediately before the elections, however, Deák succeeded in reuniting all the Liberals on the common platform of "The Twelve Points". The so-called "Twelve Points" of reformers became the ruling principles of the April laws.

1. Freedom of the Press (The abolition of censure and the censor's offices)
2. Accountable ministries in Buda and Pest (Instead of the simple arbitrary royal appointment of ministers, all ministers and the government must be elected and dismissed by the parliament)
3. An annual parliamentary session in Pest (instead of the rare ad hoc sessions which was convoked by the king, representative parliament by democratic elections, the abolition of the old estate based feudal parliament)
4. Civil and religious equality before the law (The abolition of separate laws for the common people and nobility, the abolition of the legal privileges of nobility. Full religious liberty instead of moderated tolerance: the abolition of (Catholic) state religion)
5. National Guard (The forming of the national guard, which worked like a temporary volunteer police force to enforce the new reform laws and keep the law and order during the transition of the system, thus preserving the morality of the revolution)
6. Joint share of tax burdens (abolition of the tax exemption of the nobility, the abolition of customs and tariff exemption of the nobility)
7. The abolition of socage (abolition of Feudalism and abolition of the serfdom of peasantry and their bondservices)
8. Juries and representation on an equal basis (The common people can be elected as juries at the legal courts, all people can be officials even on the highest levels of the public administration and judicature, if they have the prescribed education)
9. National Bank
10. The army to swear to support the constitution, our soldiers should not be sent to abroad, and foreign soldiers should leave our country
11. The freeing of political prisoners
12. Union (with Transylvania, including the re-union of the Hungarian and Transylvanian parliaments, which became separate during the Ottoman wars)

== Political aftermath ==
=== 1848–49 Revolution and War of Independence in Hungary ===
The pivotal juncture arose when Franz Joseph I, the nascent Austrian sovereign, enacted a unilateral abrogation of the April Laws—an act devoid of juridical legitimacy, given their prior ratification by his predecessor, King Ferdinand I. This unconstitutional extra-legal decree irrevocably inflamed tensions between the Crown and the Hungarian parliament. The imposition of Austria’s restrictive Stadion Constitution, the annulment of the April legislation, and Vienna’s martial incursions into Hungary precipitated the collapse of prime minister Lajos Batthyány’s pacifist government, which had pursued diplomatic rapprochement with the imperial court. Consequently, adherents of Lajos Kossuth—advocates of Hungary’s unqualified sovereignty—swiftly attained ascendancy within parliamentary deliberations. Austria’s armed transgressions against the Hungarian realm galvanized profound antipathy toward Habsburg dynasty, transmuting regional dissent into a fervent struggle for complete emancipation from dynastic hegemony. Thus, the political strife burgeoned into an unequivocal war of independence, irrevocably altering the trajectory of the Hungarian nation.

=== Revival during the Austro-Hungarian Compromise ===
18 years later, during the negotiations of the Austro-Hungarian Compromise of 1867, the April Laws of the revolutionary parliament (with the exception of the laws based on the 9th and 10th points) were accepted by Francis Joseph. Hungary did not regain full external autonomy until the Compromise of 1867 which would later influence Hungary's position in World War I.
