= Béla Széchenyi =

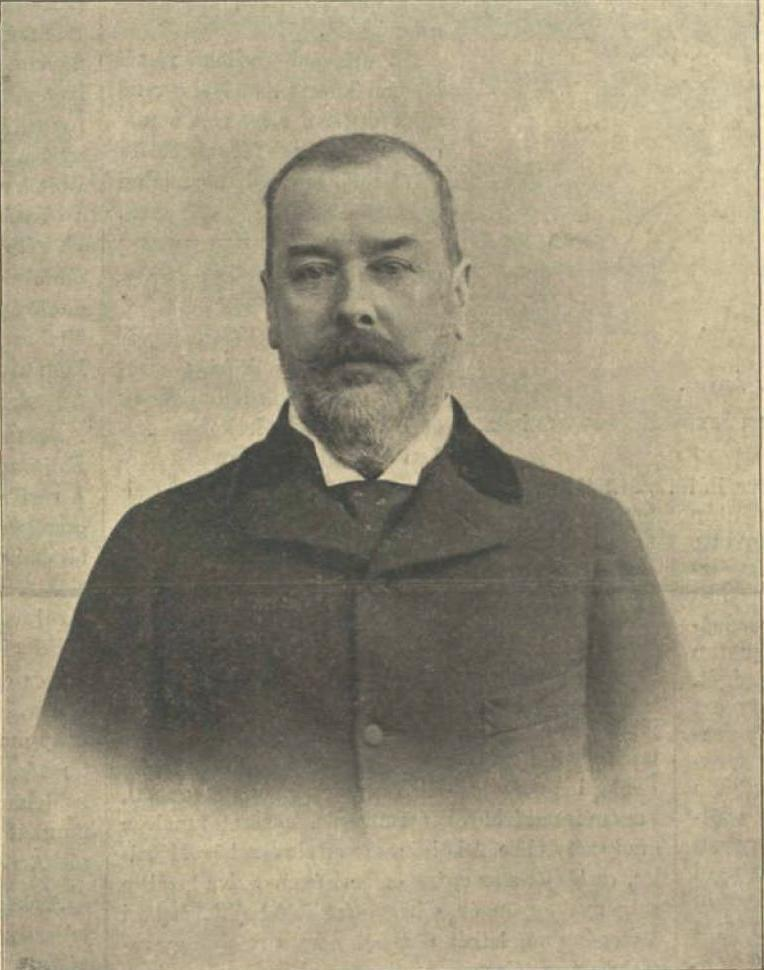
Béla Széchenyi

Count Béla István Mária Széchenyi von Sárvár-Felsővidék (3 February 1837 – 2 December 1918) was a Hungarian nobleman. He is best known for organizing an expedition to China, India and Singapore. He was accompanied by the linguist Gábor Bálint, the geologist Lajos Lóczy and geographer Gustav Kreitner.

== Early life ==
Széchenyi was born in Pest on 3 February 1837. He was the son of Crescencia von Seilern und Aspang and Count István Széchenyi, the Minister of Public Works and Transport. His brother was Ödön Széchenyi, who became an Imperial Ottoman pasha.

He was educated first in Pressburg and then at universities in Berlin and Bonn where he studied law and economics. He travelled widely to England and parts of Europe. His father was institutionalized in Döbling.

== Career ==
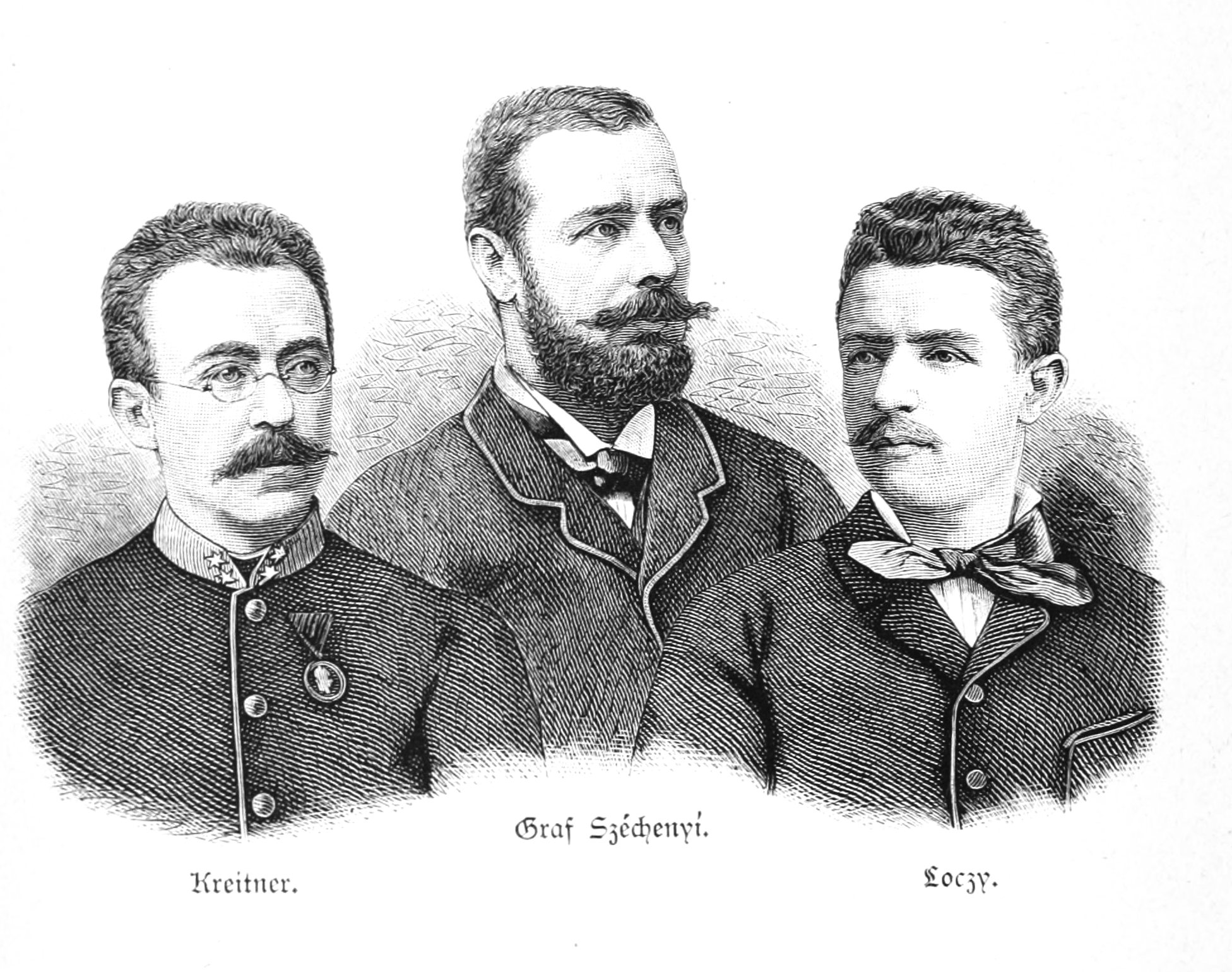
Expedition members

In 1860, he traveled to the United States and wrote a book about it in 1863. He had a seat in the assembly from 1865 but spent more time pursuing sport hunting. He travelled to Africa three times between 1867 and 1870 to hunt lions.

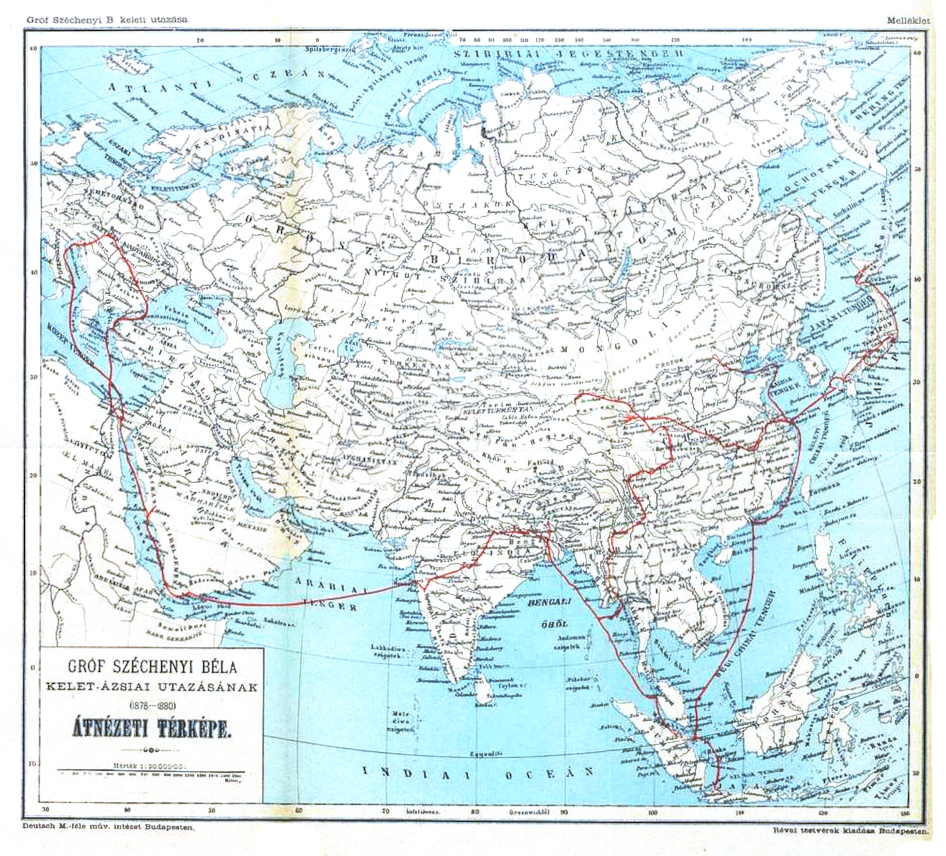
Széchenyi's travel route

After his wife died in October 1872, Széchenyi decided to distract himself from the loss by making an expedition to Asia along with Gustav Kreitner (1847–1893), Lajos Lóczy (1849–1920) and Gábor Bálint (1844–1913). Balint left the group on reaching Shanghai. The Asia expedition began in December 1877 aboard the Austrian steamship Polluce and the team travelled to India, China, Indonesia and Thailand, with his main interest being tiger hunting. The team went to Japan in 1878 and climbed Mount Fuji. His companions wrote a travelogue after returning. The also collected specimens and information on geology. The bird species Tetraophasis szechenyii was described and named from the collections. The expedition was made with promises to the Hungarian Academy of Sciences of donation from the income one his estates. This was however not respected and a payment was only made in 1894 with a loan. The three volume book on the expedition was in Hungarian and German and read mainly in Europe but various rumours were spread in the United States. One story was that Széchenyi was met in the middle of the Gobi desert by nomadic tribesmen who spoke "the purest Magyar" who fell at his feet and acknowledged their long-lost western brethren.

== Personal life ==
On 22 June 1870, in Vienna, Széchenyi married Countess Johanna "Hanna" Goberta Erdödy de Monyorókerék et Monoszló (1846–1872), a daughter of Count Lajos Erdõdy de Monyorókerék et Monoszló and Johanna Raymann. Her sister, Countess Fanni Gobertina Erdődy, was the wife of Count Alajos Károlyi. Before her death in October 1872, they had two daughters, including:

- Countess Alice Széchényi von Sárvár-Felsövideki (1871–1945), who married Tibor Teleki de Szék, a son of Sándor Teleki de Szék.
- Countess Hanna Széchényi von Sárvár-Felsövideki (1872–1957), who married her cousin, Count Lajos Lörinc Károlyi de Nagykároly.

Count Széchenyi died in Budapest on 2 December 1918.
