= Andor Széchenyi =

- Born: August 1, 1865; Pest, Kingdom of Hungary
- Died: March 2, 1907 (aged 41)
- Occupation: traveler

Count Széchenyi András Andor István Mária Béla de Sárvár-Felsővidék (August 1, 1865 – March 2, 1907) was a Hungarian nobleman and traveler. He was a grandson of Count István Széchenyi.

He was the first-born child of Ottoman Pasha Ödön Széchenyi and Irma Almay. He traveled around the world: islands of the Pacific Ocean, Somaliland, to China across Russia, Persia and India. His travelogue was published by Geographical Society in Vienna. He made attempts to travel to Paris by dirigible airship.

== Family ==
He married Elena Korostowzoff in the summer 1884 but they divorced in 1899. They had a son: Lipót András István Miklós Sándor Katalin (1886-1920).
