= Gábor Bálint =

Hungarian linguist (1844–1913)

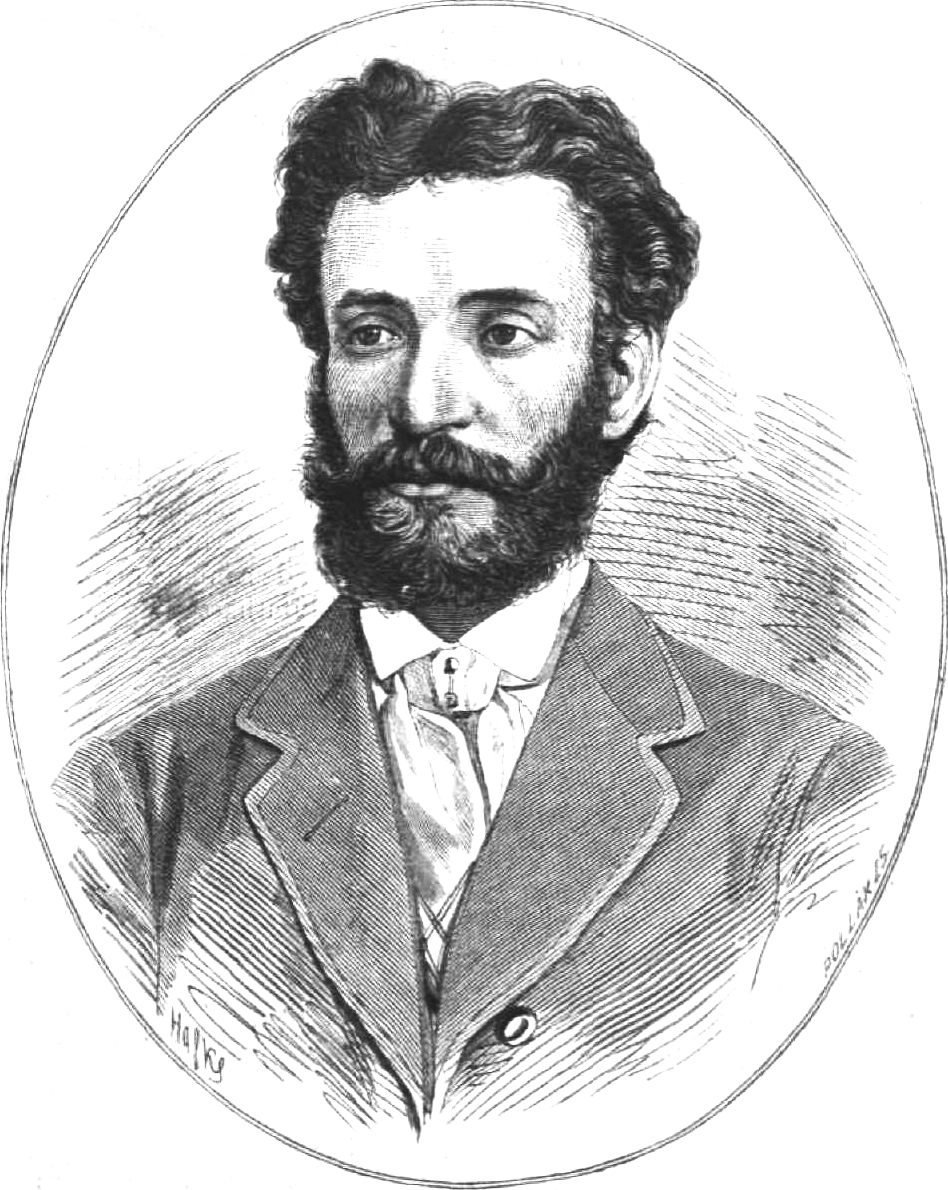

Gábor Bálint de Szentkatolnai (March 13, 1844 – May 26, 1913) was a Hungarian linguist, Esperantist, Orientalist, and traveller. He explored Central Asia and the Far East with expeditions led by Hungarian nobles. Balint was a proponent of the idea that Hungarian was a Turanian language and did not accept Finno-Ugric origins.

== Life and work ==
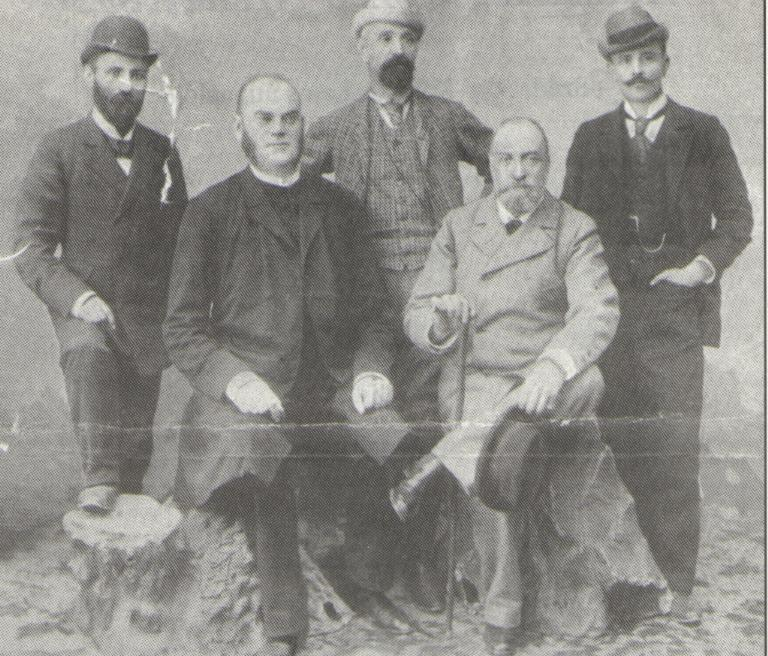
Balint (standing at the centre) on the Zichy expedition, 1895

Bálint was born to Székely parents Endre Bálint and Ágnes Illyés, in Szentkatolna, Háromszék County, Kingdom of Hungary, on March 13, 1844. The Székely were border guards in the Hungarian Kingdom and had been made into nobility in the 17th century and this was continued by the Habsburg King of Hungary, Rudolf (1572–1608) and Prince Gábor Rákóczy I of Transylvania (1630–1648). The village of Szentkatolna was not far from Kőrös where the linguist Sándor Csoma de Kőrös had been born. The Székely folk belief was that they were descendants of the Huns. Csoma, who died in 1842, explored this idea in 1822 by travelling to the region. The legends of Csoma would likely have been heard by Bálint in his youth. Despite their noble origins, the Bálint family lived under strain and he went to local schools before taking the Lyceum examination in Nagyvárad. He studied several classical and European languages before attending the University of Vienna to study law. At this time Bálint also took classes in oriental studies. Financial troubles led him to leave the University of Vienna in 1871 and complete his studies at the University of Pest where he would meet many Hungarian scholars such as János Fogarasi (1801–1878) and Ármin Vámbéry (1832–1913). Fogarasi was working on a dictionary of the Hungarian language which would be completed three years later 1874. Vámbéry had previously travelled throughout Central Asia and taught Turkish at the University of Pest. Later that year, Bálint was sponsored by the Hungarian Academy of Sciences to travel through Russia, Central Asia, and Mongolia, with a scholarship of 100 golden forints which was doubled with the support from the Minister of Religion and Education József Eötvös. He returned in 1874 with a collection of ethnographic literature of the Kalmyks (1871–1872) and Khalkhas (1873). Upon his return, Bálint joined the Academy of Sciences as a linguist with a salary of 500 forints. In the academy, there were tensions between the camp of Fogarasi and the camps of Pál Hunfalvy and Jozef Budenz (1836–1892). Bálint questioned the study of the Cheremiss language by Budenz claiming that two dialects had been mixed up. In 1877 Bálint joined an expedition organized by Count Béla Széchenyi into Asia. Bálint was interested in Tamil and Dravidian studies. Bálint caused further troubles for Hunfalvy in 1877 when he claimed that Hungarian was a branch of the Turanian languages and not related to the Finno-Ugric languages like Hunfalvy believed. Bálint also claimed that Hungarian was closer to Mongolian than Hungarian is to Finnish. In 1878, Fogarasi died and Hunfalvy and Budenz tried to block Bálint's collaboration with Vámbéry. From 1879 to 1892 Bálint took up voluntary exile and undertook travels in the Middle East, Northern Africa, and the Ottoman Empire along with his wife Rozália Spielmann. In 1893, he returned home, thanks to his Szekely friends, to be appointed chair of the department of Ural-Altaic languages, Franz Jozef University, Kolozsvár, where he remained until his retirement in 1912. He taught Japanese, Turkish, Mongolian, Korean, and Kabardian. He received an honorary doctorate in 1896. In 1895 Count Jenő Zichy led an expedition into the Caucasus with Bálint and others. Zichy's private purpose was to meet a Georgian prince named "Zici" who he thought was related.
