= Friedrich Wiesner =

Austrian lawyer and diplomat (1871–1951)

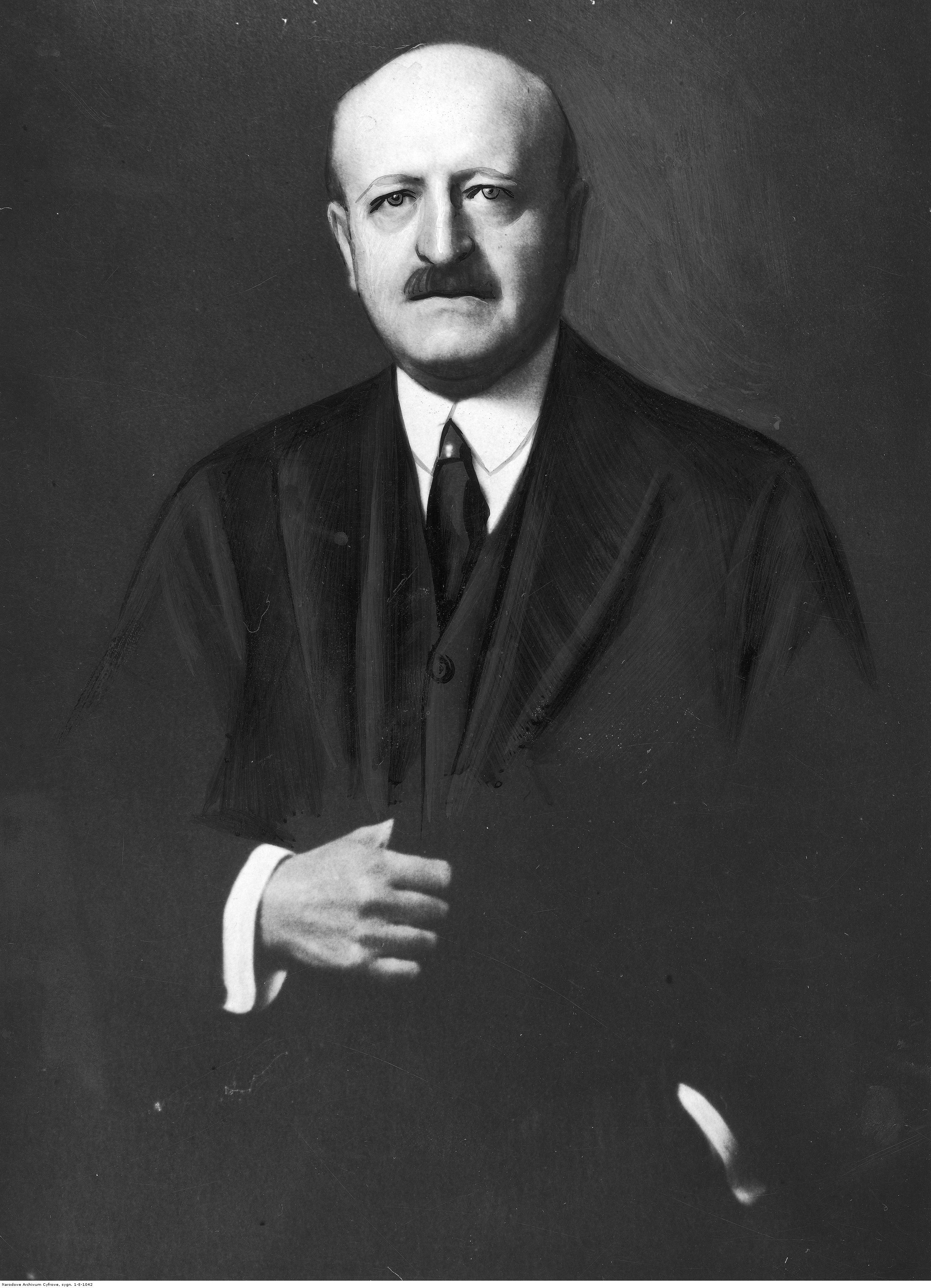
Wiesner in c. 1930

Friedrich Ritter von Wiesner (27 October 1871 – 5 November 1951) was an Austrian lawyer and diplomat. A supporter of monarchy (legitimist), he sought the restoration of the Hapsburg dynasty and was a member of the Reichsbund der Österreichser.

== Youth and education ==
Wiesner was the son of Agnes née Strabl and Julius Wiesner, and was born in Mariabrunn in Vienna. The family was Roman Catholic and his father worked as a professor at the University. After attending grammar school in Vienna and Kremsmünster, he served as a one-year volunteer in military service. He learned French, English, Italian, and Czech and studied law and political science at the University of Vienna. In 1896, he received his doctorate and became a judge in Baden bei Wien and Vienna.

After his father, a respected botanist, was knighted in 1909, Friedrich's name was changed to Friedrich Ritter von Wiesner, and he was known by that name until 1919.

== Civil service career ==
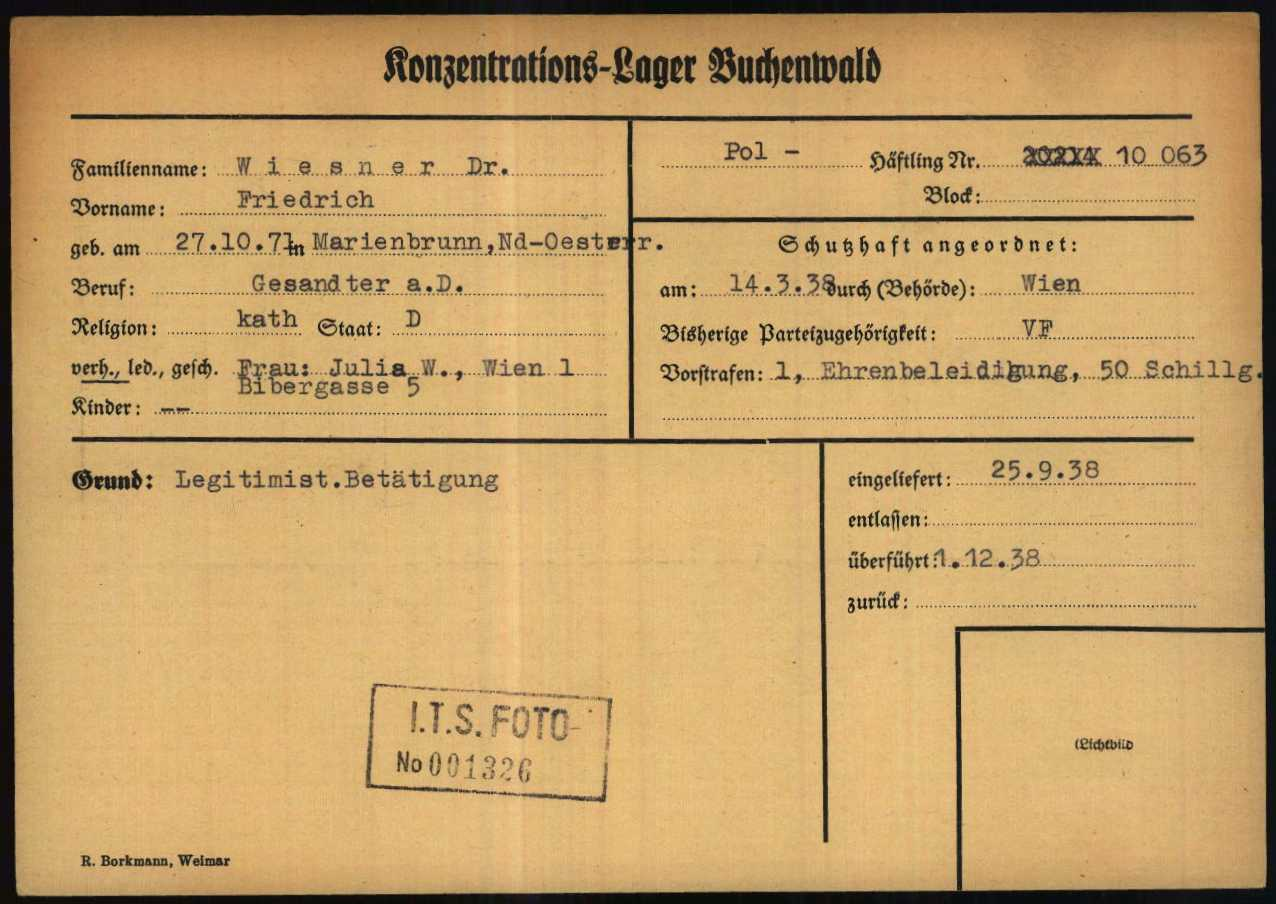
Wiesner's prisoner registration card for the Buchenwald concentration camp

In 1911, Friedrich Ritter von Wiesner joined the Austro-Hungarian Ministry of Foreign Affairs as Secretary of State. At the end of 1912, he became a lieutenant colonel in the Imperial-Royal Landwehr. In 1913, he became a section councillor in the Foreign Ministry. During the July Crisis in 1914, Wiesner headed the special commission to investigate the murder of the heir to the throne, Archduke Franz Ferdinand. He then worked at the Army High Command at Neu Sandez and then at Teschen. He served as press chief from 1917. He was a legitimist (supporter of a monarchy) and held a position in the Reichsbund der Österreichser.

== Time of National Socialism and old age ==
After Austria was annexed to Hitler's Germany, Wiesner was arrested by the Gestapo in 1938, like many other legitimists, and taken to the Buchenwald concentration camp. His wife, Julia, the widow of Gustav Kreitner whom he married in 1917, appealed to the Attorney General Welsch for his release. On 21 January 1939, Wiesner was released from "protective custody", but had to settle in Würzburg by order of the police. At the end of 1939, Wiesner was allowed to return to Vienna.
