= Gustav Kreitner =

Austrian explorer (1847–1893)

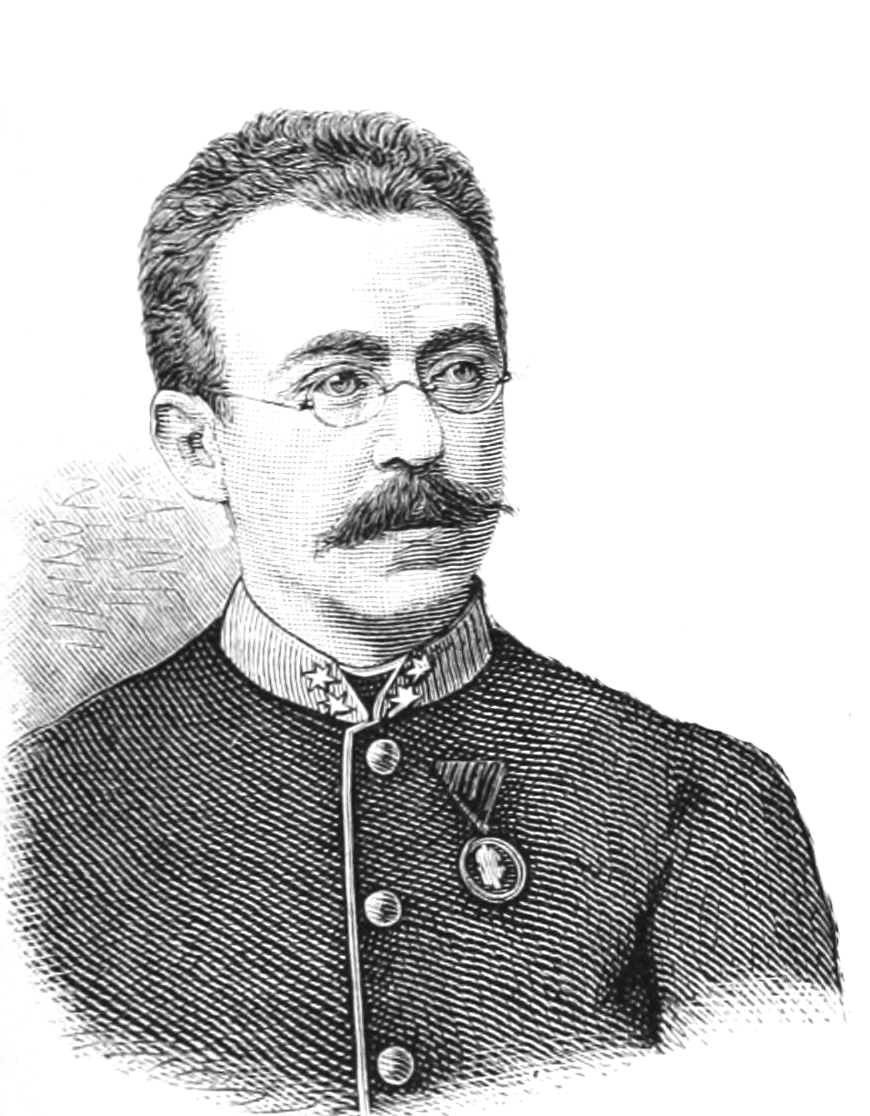
Gustav Kreitner

Gustav Ritter von Kreitner (2 August 1847 – 20 November 1893) was a Silesian-Austrian military geographer, traveler, and diplomat. He travelled through Asia as part of an expedition organized by Count Béla Széchenyi and contributed to the reports of the expedition. He also wrote a travelogue in German. He was later appointed the Austrian consul in Yokohama where he died.

== Biography ==
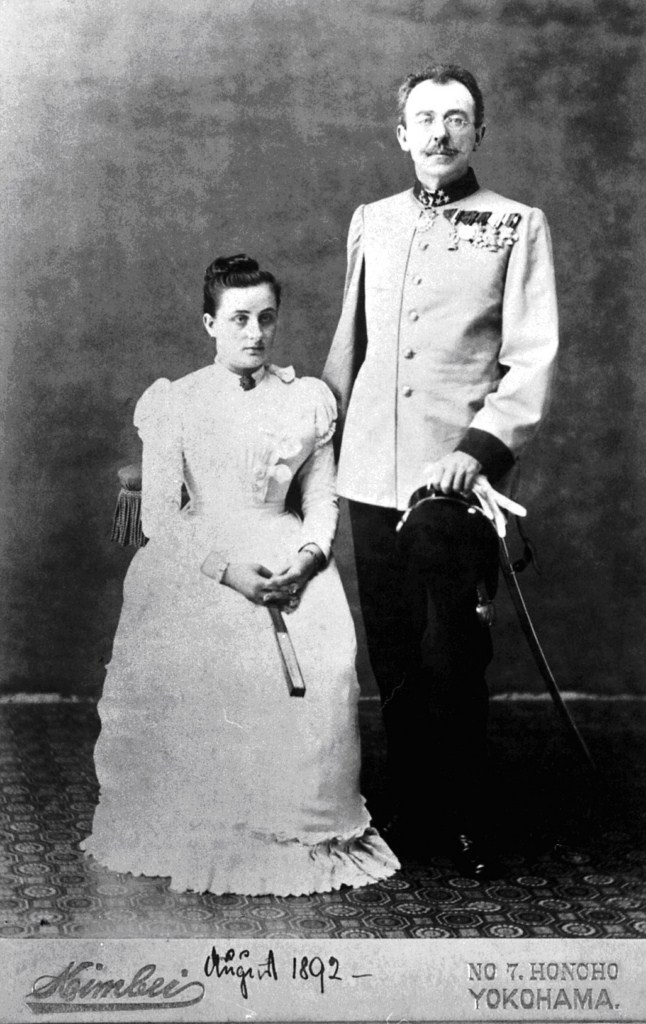
Kreitner and his wife Juliana, 1892

Kreitner was born in Odrau, Austrian Silesia (now Odry, Czech Republic), the son of brewer Philipp Kreitner and his wife Veronika, born Grünová. He was educated at Odry, Opava, and Olomouc. He trained to join the army in 1866 and was posted to Italy with his regiment. He then continued military studies and became a lieutenant in the military-geographical institute at Vienna in 1872 and was involved in surveying and mapping. In 1877, he joined a 3-year research expedition sponsored by Count Bela Szechenyi into India, Java, China, and Japan. Kreitner wrote about the places and people of Japan including the Aino and travelled with Heinrich von Siebold (1852–1908) in Japan during this expedition. Kreitner worked in Vienna until 1882 and wrote about the expedition in the book Im Fernen Osten (1881). He was knighted on his return by Emperor Franz Joseph and attended the International Geographical Congress in Vienna. He retired from military service and entered diplomatic services in 1883 and acted a consul in Shanghai. He was elected member of the Leopoldina Academy in 1886. In 1884 the Austrian government assigned him the position of consul in Yokohama and he was able to enhance trade relations between Austria and Japan. He married Juliana Koberová from Bruntál in 1884 and they had a son. He visited Europe in 1889 but his health became bad on return. He died from a stroke and was buried in the foreigners cemetery in Yokohama. Archduke Franz Ferdinand of Austria gave orders for the cruiser SMS Kaiserin Elisabeth to make an emergency stop at Yokohama to let Kreitner's family return to Vienna. The ship also collected several exotic animals from the garden of the consulate for the Vienna-Schönbrunn zoo. His widow remarried in 1917 to diplomat Friedrich Wiesner who was politically active and was sent to Buchenwald concentration camp in 1938 due to his Jewish origin. Julia was however able to secure his release in 1939. She died in 1949 and is buried in Grinzing Cemetery in Vienna. Wiesner died in 1951.
