= István Széchenyi =

Hungarian noble and statesman (1791–1860)

Count István Széchenyi de Sárvár-Felsővidék
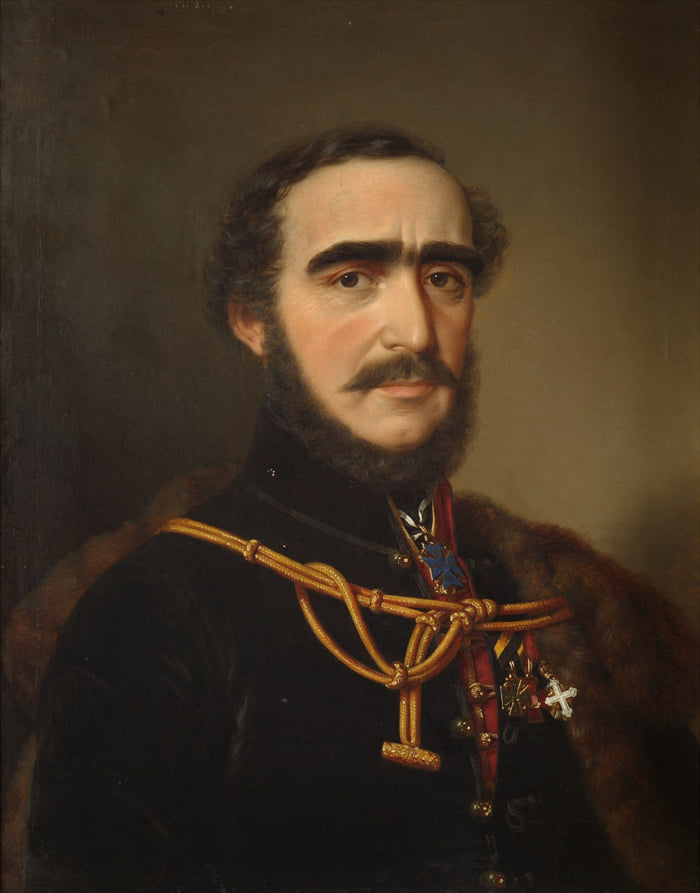

Minister of Public Works and Transport
- In office 23 March 1848 – 4 September 1848
- Preceded by: office created
- Succeeded by: László Csány

Personal details
- Born: 21 September 1791 Vienna, Archduchy of Austria
- Died: 8 April 1860 (aged 68) Oberdöbling, Austrian Empire
- Spouse: Crescence Seilern (m. 1836)
- Children: Béla; Ödön; Júlia
- Parents: Ferenc Széchényi (father); Julianna Festetics (mother)
- Profession: Politician

Count István Széchenyi de Sárvár-Felsővidék (Hungarian: Sárvár-Felsővidéki gróf Széchenyi István, pronounced [ˈʃaːrvaːrˌfɛlʃøːvideːki ɡroːf ˈseːt͡ʃeːɲi ˈiʃtvaːn]; archaic English: Stephen Széchenyi; 21 September 1791 – 8 April 1860) was a Hungarian politician, political theorist, and writer. Widely considered one of the greatest statesmen in his nation's history, within Hungary he is still known to many as "the Greatest Hungarian".

== Family and early life ==
Széchenyi was born in Vienna to Count Ferenc Széchényi and Countess Juliána Festetics de Tolna; he was the youngest of their two daughters and three sons. The Széchenyis were an old and influential noble family of Hungary. Traditionally loyal to the House of Habsburg, they were linked with noble families, such as the Liechtenstein, the House of Esterházy and the House of Lobkowicz. István Széchenyi's father was an enlightened aristocrat who founded the Hungarian National Museum and the Hungarian National Library. The boy spent his childhood both in Vienna and on the family estate of Nagycenk, Hungary.

== Military service in the Napoleonic Wars ==
After his private education, the young Széchenyi joined the Austrian army and participated in the Napoleonic Wars. He was seventeen years old when he entered the army. He fought with distinction at the battle of Raab (14 June 1809) and on 19 July brought about the subsequent junction of the two Austrian armies by conveying a message across the Danube to General Chasteler at the risk of his life.

Equally memorable was his famous ride, through the enemy's lines on the night of 16–17 October 1813, to convey to Blücher and Bernadotte the wishes of the two emperors that they should participate in the battle of Leipzig on the following day, at a given time and place. In May 1815 he was transferred to Italy, and at the battle of Tolentino scattered Murat's bodyguards by a dashing cavalry charge.

He left the service as a captain in 1826 (after his promotion to major was turned down) and turned his interest towards politics.

== Political career ==
From September 1815 to 1821, Széchenyi traveled extensively in Europe, visiting France, England, Italy, Greece and the Levant, and studying their institutions. He also established important personal connections. The rapid modernization of Britain fascinated him the most, and strongly influenced his thinking. He was also impressed with the Canal du Midi in France, and began to envision ways to improve navigation on the lower Danube and Tisza.

The Count quickly became aware of the growing gap between the modern world and his native Hungary. For the rest of his life, he was a determined reformer and promoted development. Széchenyi found early political support from his friend, Baron Miklós Wesselényi, a noble from Transylvania; however, their relation later weakened.

== The great reformer ==
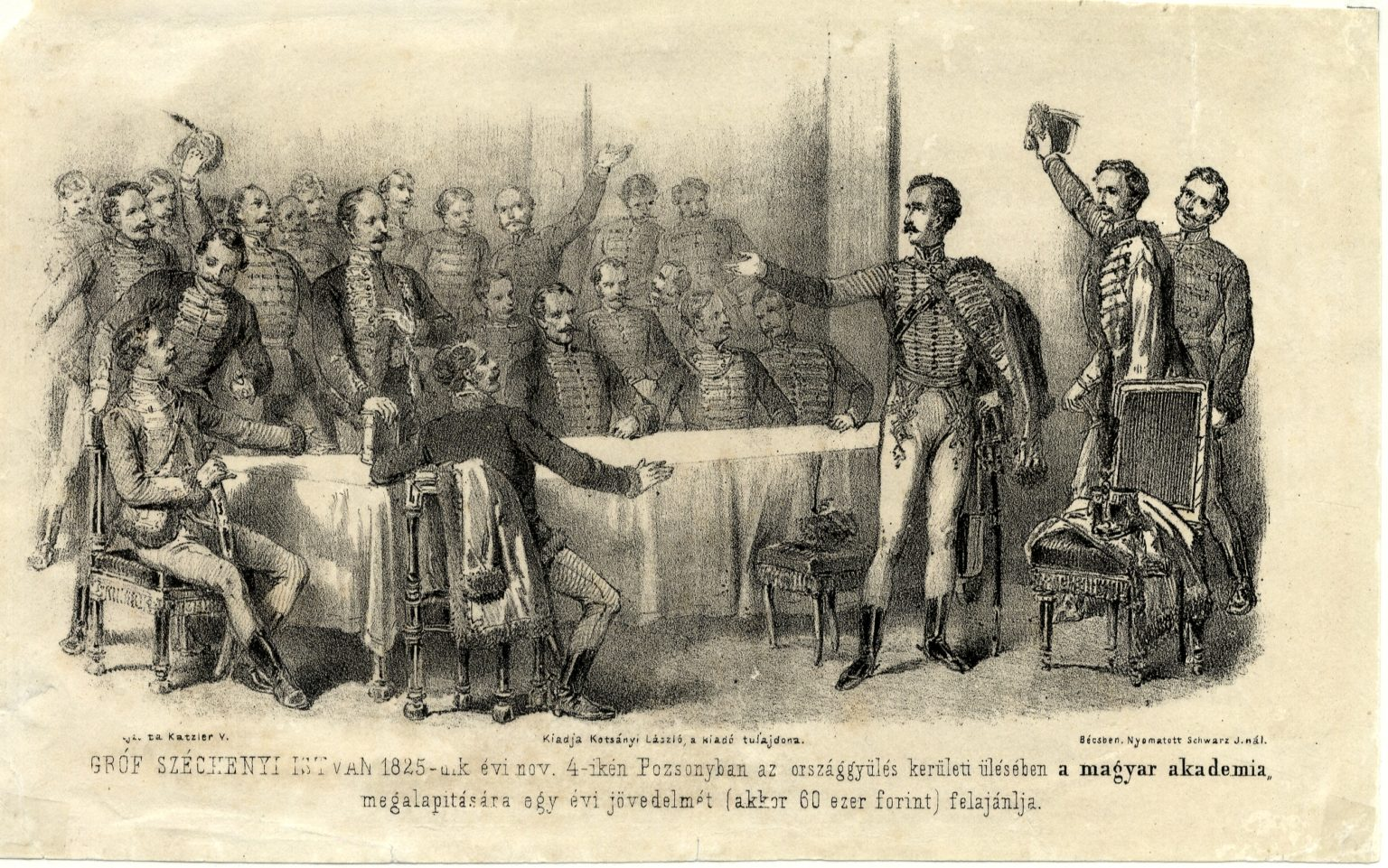
Széchenyi offers one year's income of his estate to establish and endow the Hungarian Academy of Sciences.

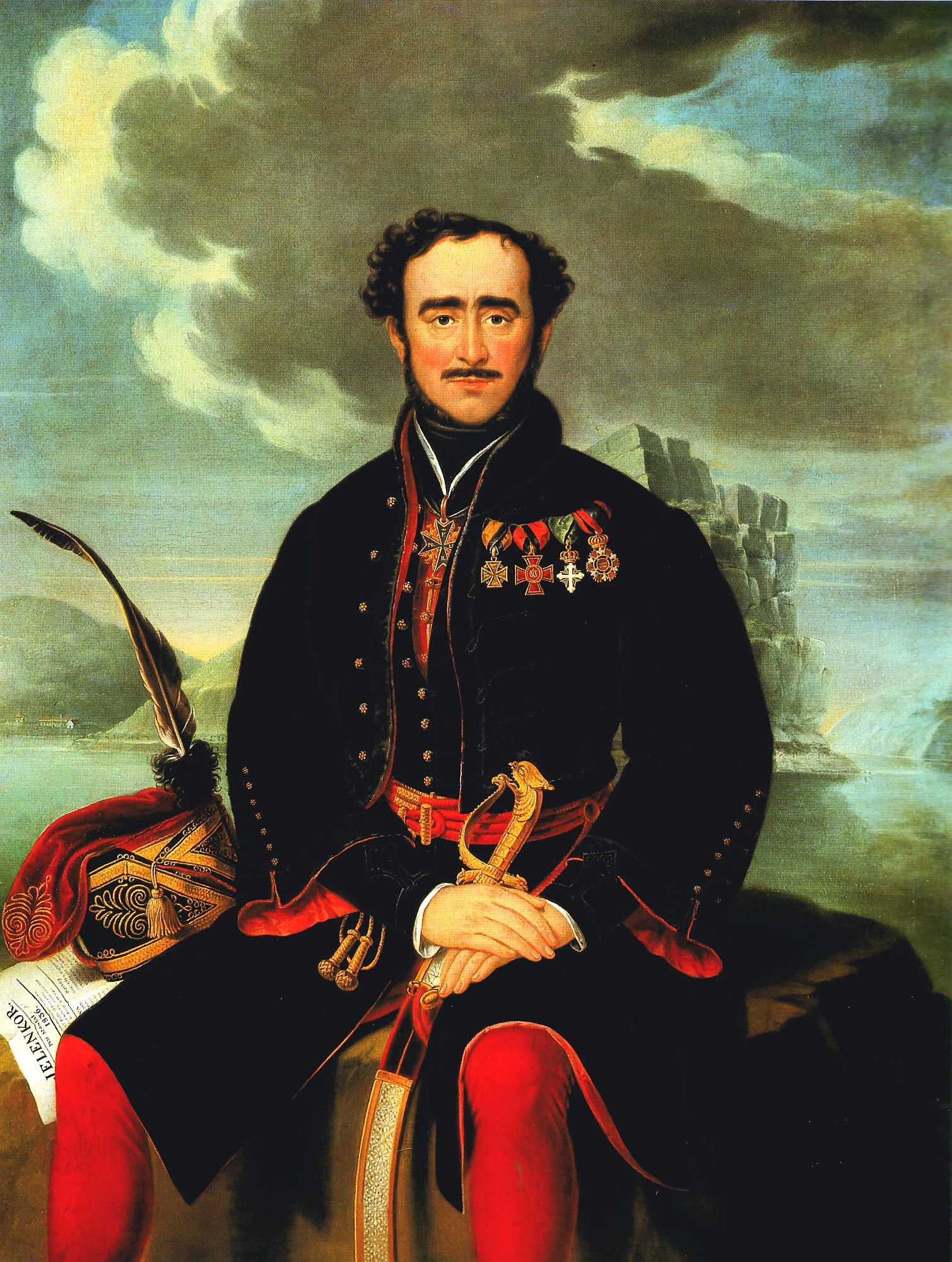
Széchenyi at the Iron Gates – painting by Schöfft József and Schöfft Ágoston, 1836

Széchenyi gained a wider reputation in 1825, by supporting the proposal of the representative of Sopron county, Pál Nagy, to establish the Hungarian Academy of Sciences; Széchenyi donated the full annual income of his estates that year, 60,000 forints, towards it. His example brought donations of 58,000 forint from three other wealthy nobles, and they gained Royal approval for the academy. He wanted to promote the use of the Hungarian language in this effort. S. became the Academy's 1st Vice-president (the President being the Palatine). While the progress of Hungary & its language was S.'s main point he aimed at greater things: In his 1st Vice-presidential address to the Academy he reminded his countrymen "now that they have established their own Academy" of their duty to support the other countries theoretically under the "crown of St. Stephen" [Croats, Czechs, Slovaks, etc.] in their own pursuits of "sound nationalism". This was an important milestone in his life and for the reform movement.

In 1827, he organized the Nemzeti Kaszinó, or National Casino, a forum for the patriotic Hungarian nobility. The Casino had an important role in the reform movement by providing an institute for political dialogues.

To reach a wider public, Széchenyi decided to publish his ideas. His series of political writings, the Hitel (Credit, 1830), the Világ, (Light, 1831), and the Stádium (1833), addressed the Hungarian nobility. He condemned their conservatism and encouraged them to give up feudal privileges (e.g. free of taxation status), and act as the driving elite for modernization.

Széchenyi (with the help of Austrian ship's company Erste Donaudampfschiffahrtsgesellschaft (DDSG) ), established the Óbuda Shipyard on the Hungarian Hajógyári Island in 1835, which was the first industrial scale steamship building company in the Habsburg Empire.

Széchenyi envisioned his program for Hungary within the framework of the Habsburg monarchy. He was convinced that Hungary initially needed a gradual economic, social and cultural development; he opposed both undue radicalism and nationalism. The latter he found particularly dangerous within the multi-ethnic Kingdom of Hungary, where people were divided by ethnicity, language and religion.

Besides his comprehensive political ideas, he concentrated on the development of transportation infrastructure, as he understood its importance for development and communication. Part of this program was the regulation of the flow of waters of the lower Danube to improve navigation, to open it to commercial shipping and trade from Buda to the Black Sea. He became the leading figure of the Danube Navigation Committee by the early 1830s, which completed its work in ten years. Previously the river had been dangerous for ships and was not efficient as an international trading route. Széchenyi was the first to promote steamboats on the Danube, the Tisza (Theiss), and Lake Balaton, also measures to open up Hungary to trade and development.

Recognizing the potential for the project for the region, Széchenyi successfully lobbied in Vienna to gain Austrian financial and political support. He was appointed as high commissioner and supervised the works for years. During this period, he traveled to Constantinople.

He wanted to develop Buda and Pest as a major political, economic and cultural center of Hungary. He supported the construction of the first permanent bridge between the two cities, the Chain Bridge. Besides its improving transportation connections, the Chain Bridge was a symbolic structure, foreshadowing the later unification of the two cities as Budapest, connected across rather than divided by the river.

== Marriage and family ==
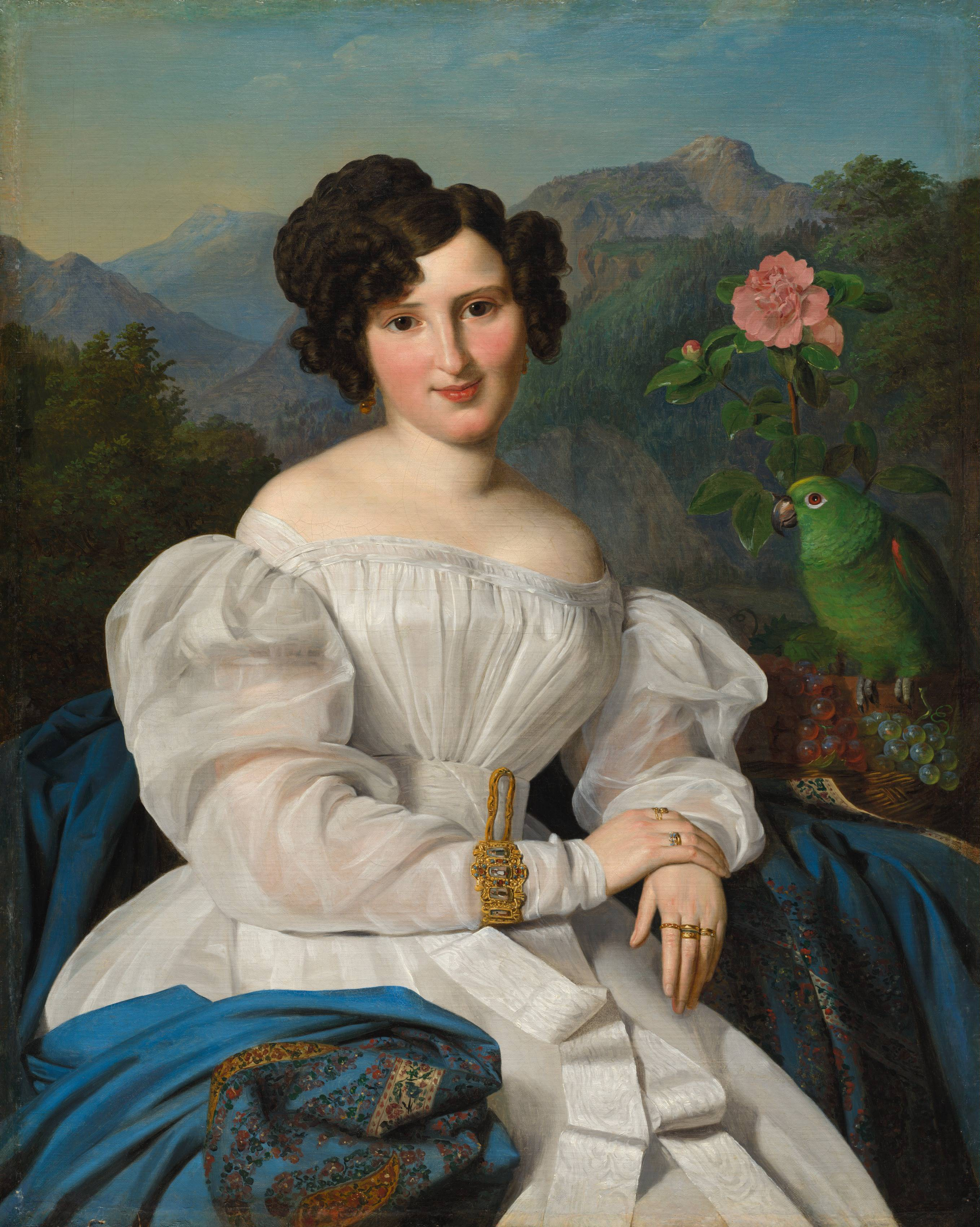
Countess Széchenyi by Ferdinand Georg Waldmüller, 1828

In 1836 at the age of 45, Széchenyi married Countess Crescencia von Seilern und Aspang in Buda. They had three children:

- Júlia Széchenyi, who died at the age of three months
- Béla Széchenyi, who traveled to Eastern countries several times
- Ödön Széchenyi, who died as a Turkish pasha

Béla Széchenyi became known for his wide travels and explorations in the East Indies, Japan, China, Java, Borneo, western Mongolia, and the frontiers of Tibet. In 1893, he published an account of his experiences, written in German.

== Political rivalry with Kossuth ==
His relations with Lajos Kossuth were not good: he always thought Kossuth was a political agitator who overplayed his popularity. Széchenyi, although in a minority, continued to counsel for caution in the Diet and other meetings. In March 1848, he accepted the portfolio of ways and communications "in the first responsible Magyar administration" under Lajos Batthyány, but he feared the disruption of revolution.

=== "Long debate" of reformers in the press (1841–1848) ===
In his 1841 pamphlet People of the East (Kelet Népe), Count Széchenyi responded to Kossuth's reform proposals. Széchenyi believed that economic, political and social reforms should proceed slowly and with care, to avoid the potentially disastrous prospect of violent interference from the Habsburg dynasty. Széchenyi was aware of the spread of Kossuth's ideas in Hungarian society, which he took to overlook the need for a good relationship with the Habsburg dynasty.

Kossuth, for his part, rejected the role of the aristocracy, and questioned established norms of social status. In contrast to Széchenyi, Kossuth believed that in the process of social reform it would be impossible to restrain civil society in a passive role. He warned against attempting to exclude wider social movements from political life, and supported democracy, rejecting the primacy of elites and the government. In 1885, he labeled Széchenyi a liberal elitist aristocrat, while Széchenyi considered Kossuth to be a democrat.

Széchenyi was an isolationist politician, while Kossuth saw strong relations and collaboration with international liberal and progressive movements as essential for the success of liberty.

Széchenyi based his economic policy on the laissez-faire principles practiced by the British Empire, while Kossuth supported protective tariffs due to the comparatively weak Hungarian industrial sector. While Kossuth envisioned the construction of a rapidly industrialized country, Széchenyi wanted to preserve the traditionally strong agricultural sector as the main characteristic of the economy.

== Retreat from politics ==
The Hungarian Revolution of 1848 developed in the direction of Hungary attempting to break away from Habsburg rule, an attempt eventually crushed with severe repression by the Austrian authorities – both of which were very much contrary to Széchenyi's way of thinking and his vision for Hungary's future. In early September 1848, Széchenyi's nervous state brought depression and a breakdown; his doctor ordered him to the private Asylum of Dr. Gustav Görgen in Oberdöbling. With his wife's care, he gradually recovered enough to resume writing but did not return to politics. He wrote the book Önismeret (Self awareness) about children, education and pedagogy. He also wrote Ein Blick (One Look), a study of the deep political problems of Hungary at the beginning of the 1850s.

== Death ==
Still suffering from depression, Széchenyi committed suicide by a gunshot to his head on 8 April 1860, at the age of 68. (8 April was the anniversary of the death of the Hungarian national hero Francis II Rákóczi, a century earlier). All Hungary mourned Széchenyi's death. The academy was in official mourning, along with the most prominent persons of the leading political and cultural associations (including counts József Eötvös, János Arany, and Károly Szász). His rival Kossuth said he was "the greatest of the Magyars".

Széchenyi was buried at his family’s estate in Nagycenk, with more than 50,000 people visiting his grave in the three days that followed his funeral. A portion of his skull that was impacted by the gunshot is displayed at the family mausoleum.

== Writings ==
- Hitel (Credit, 1830)
- Világ, (World/Light, 1831)
- Stádium (1833)
- Önismeret (Self awareness)
- Ein Blick (One Look)
- Most of his numerous writings on political and economic subjects were translated into German for wider appreciation in Europe.
- From 1884 to 1896, the Hungarian Academy published a nine-volume edition of his writings in Pest.

== Legacy and honors ==
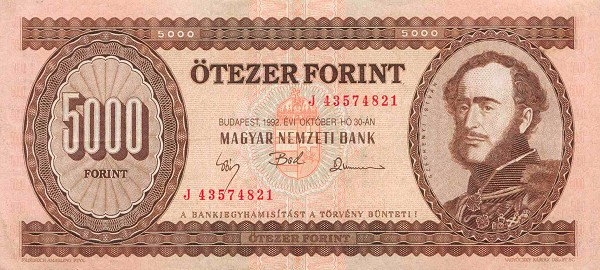
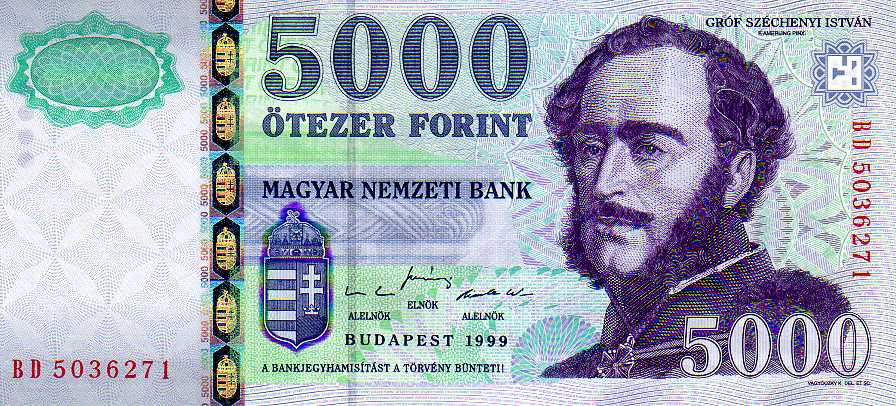
On the 5000 Hungarian forint banknote (upper: between 1990–1999, lower: 1999–2017)
- A statue of him was unveiled on 23 May 1880 in Budapest.
- Also in 1880, a statue commemorating him was unveiled in Sopron.
- In 1898, the chain bridge over the Danube was named Széchenyi Lánchíd "Széchenyi Chain Bridge" in his honour.
- In a survey by Median and Elemér Hankiss at the end of 2007, the Hungarian public ranked 1st "greatest statesman of all time " among Hungarian historical figures.
- In 2008, the István Széchenyi Chair in International Economics was privately endowed at Quinnipiac University in Hamden, Connecticut, United States. In collaboration with Mathias Corvinus Collegium and Sapientia Hungarian University of Transilvania, the Chair oversees and develops three major academic programs to strengthen relations with Central Eastern Europe, especially Hungary: the Hungarian American Business Leaders (HABL), the QU executive MBA Trip in Hungary, and the Foreign Lecture Series.
- Since 1990, Széchenyi's portrait has been featured on the 5000 Hungarian forint banknote, with a new design in 1999.
- In 2002, a Hungarian made-for-TV movie portrayed his life from 1820 to 1860; it is entitled A Hídember (The Bridgeman) (in Hungarian).
- An István Széchenyi Postage stamp was issued by Hungary on 1 July 1932 by honoring him in the Famous Hungarians series of stamps.
- Another stamp in his honor was issued by Hungary on 3 May 1966; it shows the Chain Bridge in the backdrop of his portrait. A stamp of the face of István Széchenyi superimposed on the island of the Danube was issued by Hungary on 8 April 2016.
- Asteroid 91024 Széchenyi, discovered by astronomers Krisztián Sárneczky and László Kiss at the Piszkéstető Station in 1998, was named in his memory. The official naming citation was published by the Minor Planet Center on 22 January 2008 (M.P.C. 61766).

Government offices
Preceded by office created	Minister of Public Works and Transport; 1848	Succeeded by László Csány
