= Odry =

- Town
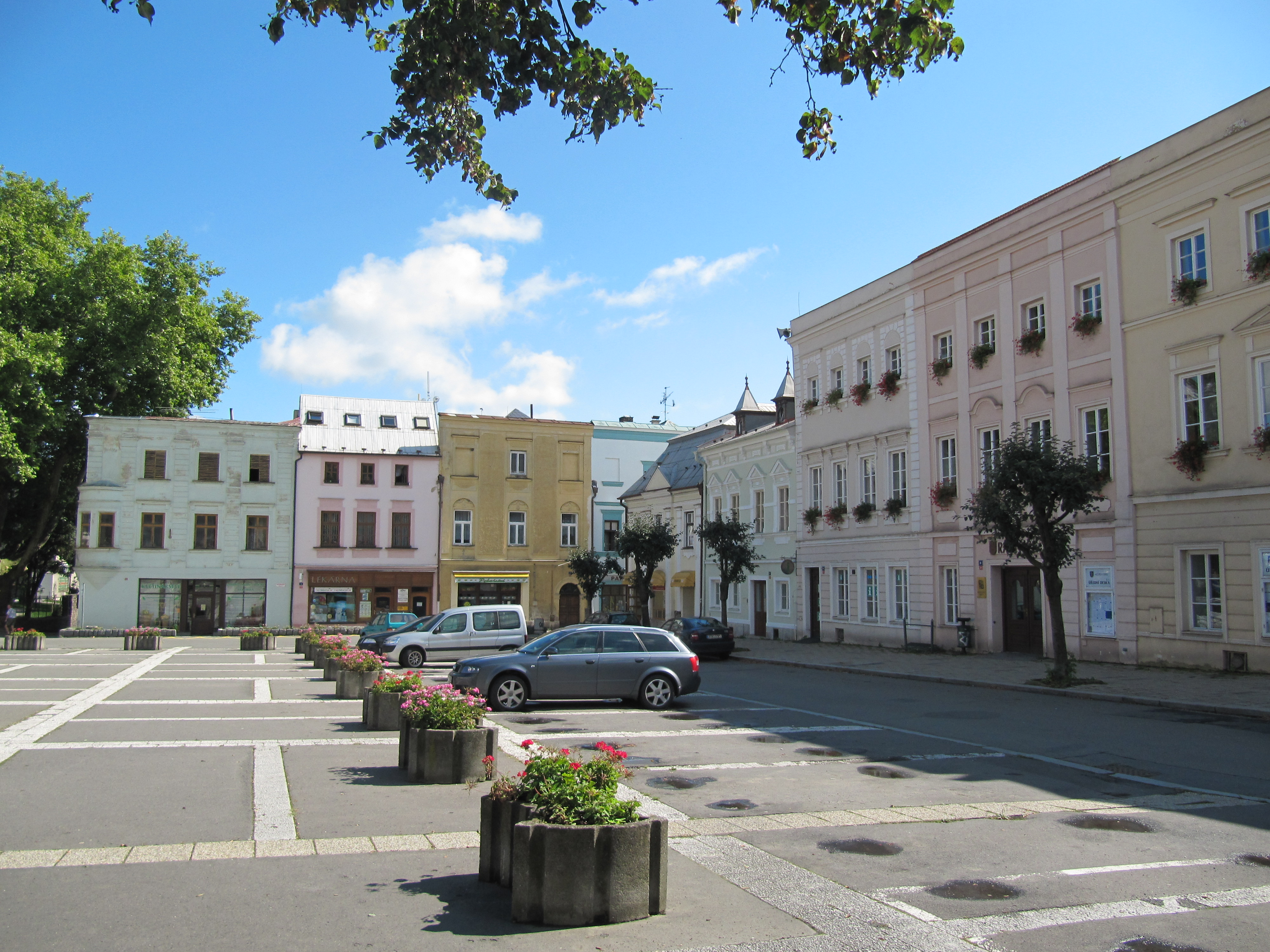
- The square Masarykovo náměstí

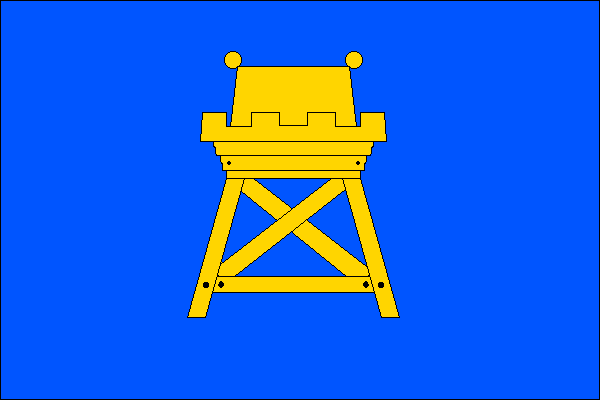
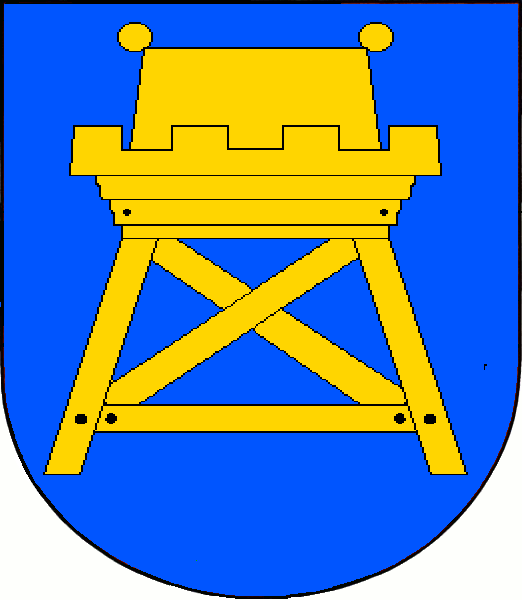
- Flag Coat of arms

- Location in the Czech Republic
- Coordinates: 49°39′45″N 17°49′51″E
- Country: Czech Republic
- Region: Moravian-Silesian
- District: Nový Jičín
- First mentioned: 1234

Government
  - Mayor: Libuše Králová

Area
  - Total: 74.05 km^{2} (28.59 sq mi)
- Elevation: 274 m (899 ft)

Population (2026-01-01)
  - Total: 7,336
  - Density: 99.07/km^{2} (256.6/sq mi)
- Time zone: UTC+1 (CET)
  - Summer (DST): UTC+2 (CEST)
- Postal codes: 742 35, 742 36
- Website: www.odry.cz

Odry (Czech pronunciation: [ˈodrɪ]; German: Odrau) is a town in Nový Jičín District in the Moravian-Silesian Region of the Czech Republic. It has about 7,300 inhabitants. The town is located on the Oder River in the Nízký Jeseník range.

The historic town centre is well preserved and is protected as an urban monument zone. The main landmark of Odry is the Church of Saint Bartholomew.

== Administrative division ==
Odry consists of nine municipal parts (in brackets population according to the 2021 census):

- Odry (5,209)
- Dobešov (211)
- Kamenka (155)
- Klokočůvek (150)
- Loučky (502)
- Pohoř (188)
- Tošovice (232)
- Veselí (153)
- Vítovka (209)

Kamenka and Klokočůvek form an exclave of the municipal territory.

== Etymology ==
The name Odry is derived from the river Oder.

== Geography ==
Odry is located about 14 kilometres (9 mi) northwest of Nový Jičín and 32 km (20 mi) southwest of Ostrava. It lies in the Nízký Jeseník range in the valley of the Oder River. The highest point is the hill Suchá at 578 m (1,896 ft) above sea level. A system of fishponds is situated in the southern part of the municipal territory.

== History ==
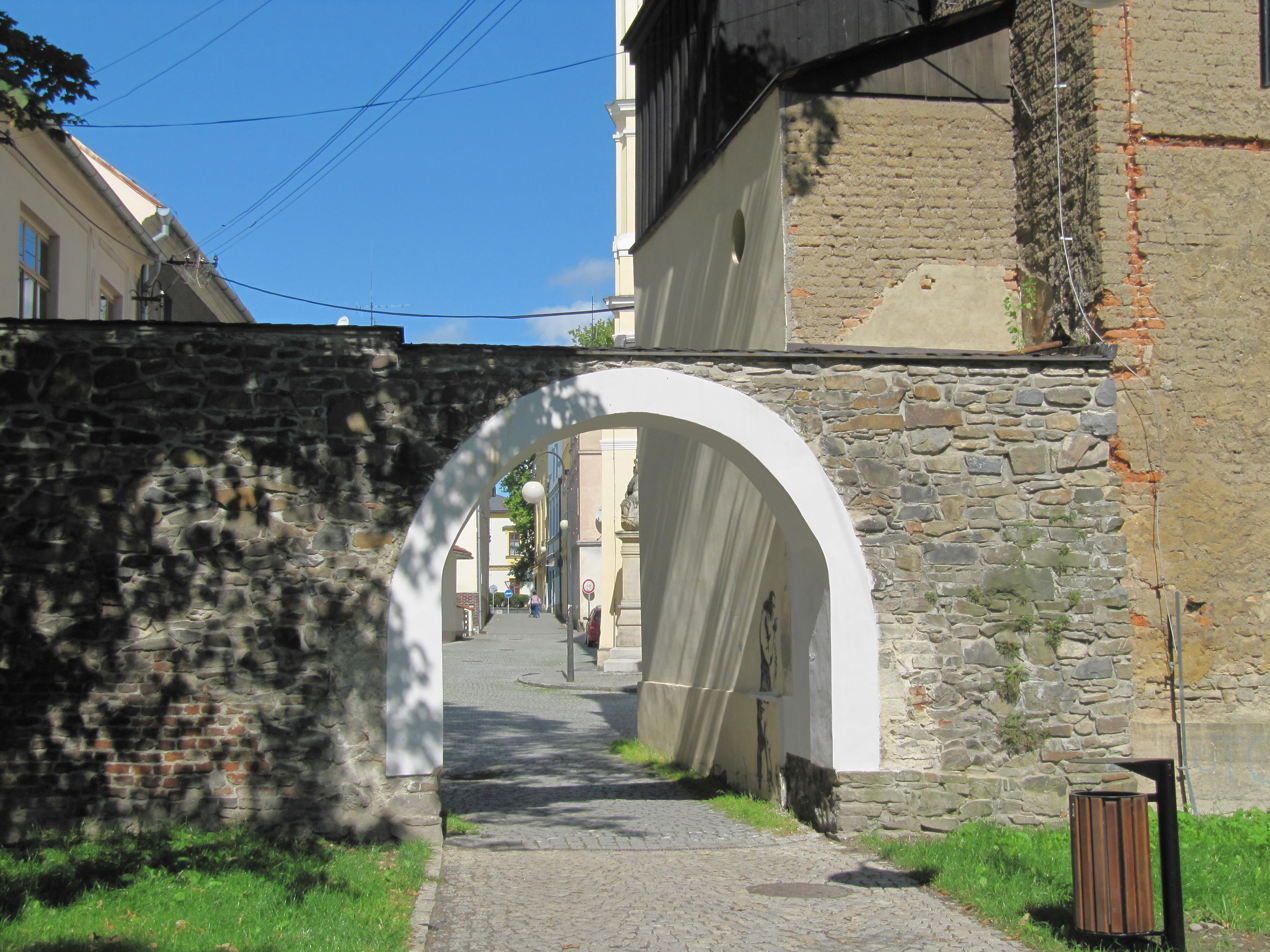
Remains of the town fortifications

A predecessor of Odry was a settlement known as Vyhnanov. The first written mention of Vyhnanov is from 1234. In the second half of the 13th century, a new fortified town was established on the site of Vyhnanov. In the 14th century, Odry became a local economic centre. During the Hussite Wars, Odry served as a military base of the Hussites. In 1481, the town became a part of the Duchy of Troppau and Silesia.

In the 18th century, lead and silver were mined in Odry and its surroundings. In 1774, a woolen goods factory was established here, and in the mid-19th century, drapery industry developed. In 1866, the first rubber factory in the country started operating here.

== Demographics ==
Historical population

Year	Pop.	±%
1869	7,558	—
1880	7,010	−7.3%
1890	7,343	+4.8%
1900	7,496	+2.1%
1910	7,625	+1.7%

Year	Pop.	±%
1921	6,644	−12.9%
1930	7,112	+7.0%
1950	5,893	−17.1%
1961	6,617	+12.3%
1970	6,769	+2.3%

Year	Pop.	±%
1980	7,311	+8.0%
1991	7,401	+1.2%
2001	7,444	+0.6%
2011	7,274	−2.3%
2021	7,009	−3.6%

Source: Censuses

== Transport ==
Odry is located on a railway line of local importance Suchdol nad Odrou–Budišov nad Budišovkou.

== Sights ==
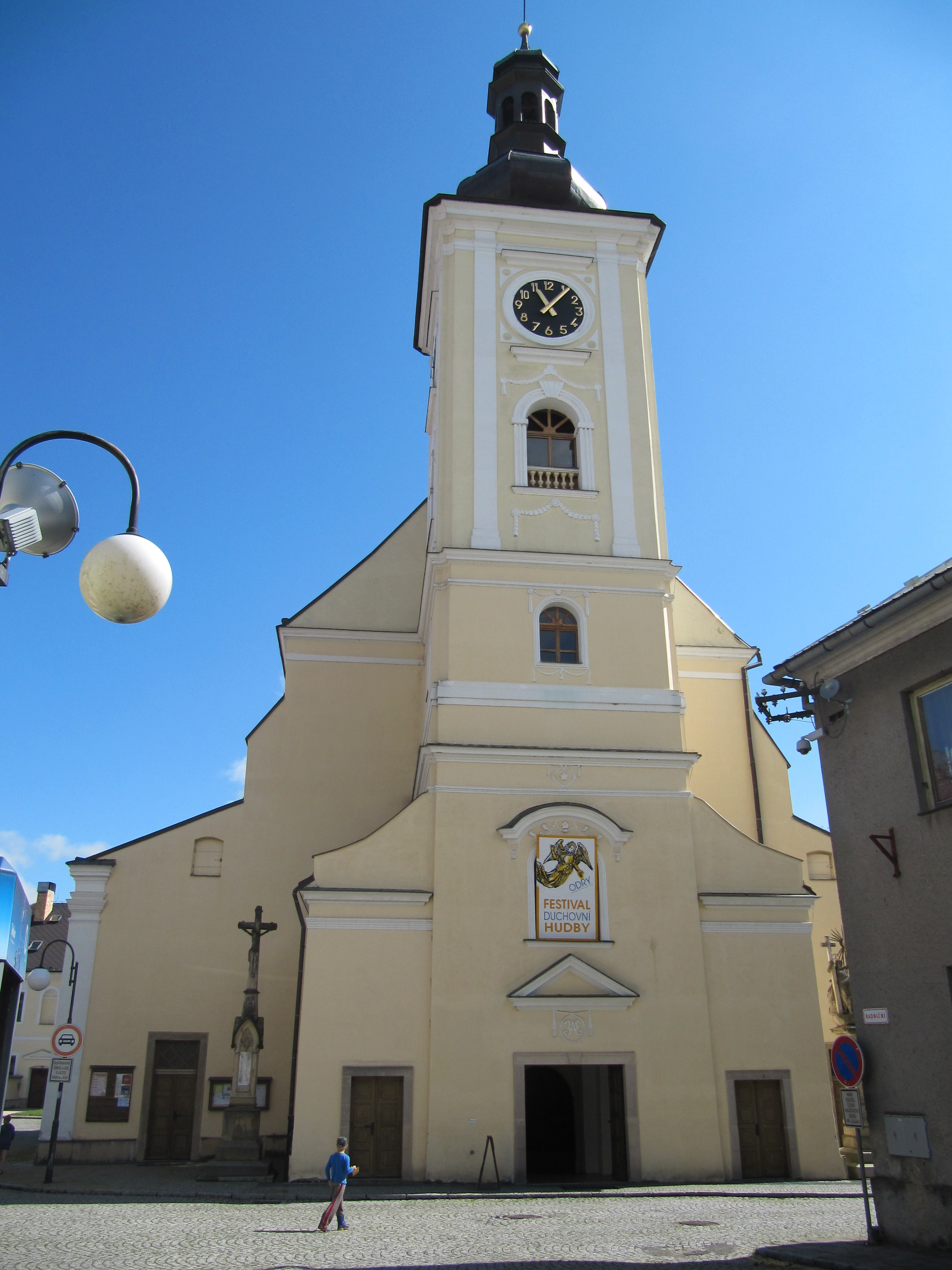
Church of Saint Bartholomew

The historic centre is formed by the square Masarykovo náměstí and its surroundings. The square is lined with Renaissance burgher houses and in the middle are the statue of the Assumption of the Virgin Mary from 1785 and a Neoclassical fountain from 1897. Remains of the town fortifications from the 15th century with a semi-circular bastion are preserved to this day.

The most important monument is the Church of Saint Bartholomew. The originally Gothic church was rebuilt in the Baroque style in 1691–1692. The bell in the church tower dates from 1374 and is the second oldest bell in Moravia. Notable is also the rectory, which was rebuilt into its current form in 1699.

== Notable people ==
- Gustav Kreitner (1847–1893), Austrian geographer, traveller and diplomat
- Leopold Münster (1920–1944), German Luftwaffe pilot
- Ferdinand Ulrich (1931–2020), German philosopher

== Twin towns – sister cities ==
Odry is twinned with:

- Kuźnia Raciborska, Poland
- Niefern-Öschelbronn, Germany
