= Leopold Münster =

German World War II fighter pilot

- Münster as a Feldwebel
- Born: 13 December 1920; Pohorsch (Pohoř), Czechoslovakia
- Died: 8 May 1944 (aged 23); Hildesheim, Nazi Germany
- Cause of death: Killed in action
- Burial place: Pohorsch
- Military career
- Allegiance: Nazi Germany
- Branch: Luftwaffe
- Service years: 1939–1944
- Rank: Leutnant (second lieutenant)
- Unit: JG 3
- Commands: 5./JG 3, II./JG 3
- Conflicts: See battles World War II: Operation Barbarossa; Siege of Malta; Battle of Stalingrad; Defense of the Reich †
- Awards: Knight's Cross of the Iron Cross with Oak Leaves

Leopold Münster (13 December 1920 – 8 May 1944) was a German Luftwaffe military aviator and fighter ace during World War II. He is credited with 95 aerial victories achieved in over 500 combat missions. This figure includes 70 aerial victories on the Eastern Front, and further 25 victories over the Western Allies, including eight four-engined bombers.

Born in Pohorsch (Pohoř), Münster grew up in the First Czechoslovak Republic. Following the German occupation of Czechoslovakia, he joined the Luftwaffe in January 1939. Following flight training, Münster was posted to Jagdgeschwader 3 (JG 3—3rd Fighter Wing) in March 1941. Flying with this wing, he claimed his first aerial victory on 6 July 1941 on the Eastern Front during Operation Barbarossa. Following his 51st aerial victory, Münster was awarded the Knight's Cross of the Iron Cross on 21 December 1942. In October 1943, he and his unit were transferred to the Western Front fighting in Defense of the Reich. He was then appointed Staffelkapitän (squadron leader) of the 5. Staffel (5th squadron) of JG 3. Münster was killed in a mid-air collision with a Consolidated B-24 Liberator bomber on 8 May 1944. Posthumously, he was awarded the Knight's Cross of the Iron Cross with Oak Leaves on 12 May 1944.

== Early life and career ==
Münster was born on 13 December 1920 in Pohorsch (Pohoř) in the district of Neutitschein (Nový Jičín) within the Sudetenland region of Czechoslovakia, present-day part of Odry in the Czech Republic. His father was a construction foreman and farmer, his mother died when he was three years old. In 1926, Münster attended the Volksschule, a combined primary and lower secondary school, in Hochheim. In 1931, he transferred to the Bürgerschule, a school preparing pupils for a vocational education. He graduated in 1935 and then learned the trade of a house painter and decorator as well as sign painter. In parallel, he attended the vocational school in Mährisch-Ostrau, present-day Ostrava. As a child, he was a member of the sudetendeutsche Jugendbewegung (Sudeten German youth movement).

Following the German occupation of Czechoslovakia in October 1938, Münster volunteered for military service and joined the Luftwaffe on 7 January 1939. Following his recruit training with Fliegerausbildungs-Regiment 43 (43rd Flight Training Regiment) at Ingolstadt, he was posted to the airfield staff at Leipheim on 1 April. After he had passed his flight aptitude test, he was transferred to flight school at Crailsheim on 1 June. There, he was trained as a pilot which he completed in June 1940. (Note: Flight training in the Luftwaffe progressed through the levels A1, A2 and B1, B2, referred to as A/B flight training. A training included theoretical and practical training in aerobatics, navigation, long-distance flights and dead-stick landings. The B courses included high-altitude flights, instrument flights, night landings and training to handle the aircraft in difficult situations. For pilots destined to fly multi-engine aircraft, the training was completed with the Luftwaffe Advanced Pilot's Certificate (Erweiterter Luftwaffen-Flugzeugführerschein), also known as the C-Certificate.) Münster was promoted to Gefreiter (Lance Corporal) on 1 October 1940. In July 1940, Münster was transferred to the advanced Flugzeugführerschule C (FFS C—advanced flight school) at Burg bei Magdeburg where he received further theoretical training. On 1 October, he was promoted to Unteroffizier (sergeant) and transferred to the 3. Staffel (3rd squadron) of Jagdfliegerschule 3, the fighter pilot school at Fürth.

== World War II ==
World War II in Europe had begun on Friday, 1 September 1939, when German forces invaded Poland. Münster completed his fighter pilot training in March 1941 and then flew some missions in Defense of the Reich from Fürth and Zerbst. On 18 March, he was posted to the 2. Staffel of Ergänzungsgruppe of Jagdgeschwader 3 (JG 3—3rd Fighter Wing). The Ergänzungsgruppe was a supplementary training group attached to JG 3 under the command of Major Alfred Müller with 2. (Schul—training) Staffel headed by Oberleutnant Erwin Neuerburg. On 1 June, Münster was transferred to the 4. Staffel of JG 3. This Staffel was commanded by Hauptmann Gordon Gollob and subordinated to II. Gruppe (2nd group) of JG 3 led by Hauptmann Lothar Keller.

=== Operation Barbarossa ===
Emblem of JG 3 "Udet"

In preparation for Operation Barbarossa, the German invasion of the Soviet Union, II. Gruppe headed east on 18 June. Following a stopover at Kraków, the unit was moved to Hostynne. At the start of the campaign, JG 3 under the command of Major (Major) Günther Lützow was subordinated to the V. Fliegerkorps (5th Air Corps), under the command of General der Flieger (General of the Aviators) Robert Ritter von Greim, itself part of Luftflotte 4 (4th Air Fleet), under the command of Generaloberst (Colonel General) Alexander Löhr. These air elements supported Generalfeldmarschall (Field Marshal) Gerd von Rundstedt's Army Group South, with the objective of capturing Ukraine and its capital Kiev. At 17:00 on 21 June 1941, the 5th Air Corps, based at Lipsko, briefed the various unit commanders of the upcoming attack. (Note: All times used in this section are Central European Time unless otherwise noted.) That evening, Gruppenkommandeur (group commander) of II. Gruppe Keller informed his subordinates of the attack.

The invasion of the Soviet Union began on 22 June 1941. II. Gruppe flew its first missions on the Eastern Front shortly before 04:00, flying low attacks against Soviet airfields in the vicinity of Lvov in Ukraine. At 06:30 the Gruppe fought its first aerial battles. In the beginning of July 1941, the front in the vicinity of the northern sector of Army Group South became increasingly fluid. This necessitated the relocation of II. Gruppe to Volodymyr-Volynskyi. The rapid advance of German ground forces required II. Gruppe to move to Lutsk on 5 July and then to Dubno that evening. The following day, II. Gruppe flew combat air patrols over Berdychiv and Zhytomyr. On one of these missions, Münster claimed his first aerial victory over a ZKB-19, referring to an Ilyushin DB-3 bomber. On 9 July, he was credited with the destruction of two further DB-3 bombers. Münster received the Iron Cross 2nd Class (Eisernes Kreuz 2. Klasse) on 24 July 1941 and the Iron Cross 1st Class (Eisernes Kreuz 1. Klasse) on 7 September 1941.

Following his ninth aerial victory claimed and 86 combat missions flown, Münster was transferred to the Stab (headquarters unit) of II. Gruppe. There, he increased his total of aerial victories claimed to twelve. Additionally he was credited with five ground victories and the destruction of a locomotive, increasing his number of combat missions flown to 124. On 31 October 1941, II. Gruppe flew its last combat mission over the northern Crimean combat zone and was ordered to retreat to Germany for a period of rest and refurbishment. On 1 December 1941, JG 3 was given the honorary name "Udet" following the suicide of World War I fighter pilot and Luftwaffe Generalleutnant Ernst Udet. Münster was awarded the Front Flying Clasp of the Luftwaffe in Gold (Frontflugspange in Gold) on 16 December 1941.

=== Mediterranean Theatre ===
At Wiesbaden-Erbenheim airfield, II. Gruppe was equipped with Messerschmitt Bf 109 F-4 trop as the unit was to be deployed in the Mediterranean Theatre. After almost two months of rest, II. Gruppe was ordered to transfer to Sicily in early January 1942. Münster claimed one aerial victory in this theatre of operations. On 22 February, II. Gruppe was ordered to an airfield at Santo Pietro, approximately 15 kilometers (9.3 miles) northwest of Comiso, Sicily. That day, Münster claimed a Hawker Hurricane shot down over Malta. II. Gruppe flew its last combat mission over Malta on 25 April 1942. On 27 April, II. Gruppe arrived at Plzeň where it was placed under the command of Hauptmann (Captain) Kurt Brändle.

=== Eastern Front ===
After three weeks of rest, II. Gruppe was moved to the southern sector of the Eastern Front and placed under control of VIII. Fliegerkorps (8th Air Corps) on the left wing of Army Group South. During this period, Münster was promoted to Feldwebel (platoon sergeant) on 1 April. Based at Chuhuiv, the Gruppe participated in the Second Battle of Kharkov, the Soviet attempt to retake the city. On 20 May, Münster claimed two aerial victories, a Mikoyan-Gurevich MiG-1 fighter and an Ilyushin Il-2 ground-attack aircraft. During this engagement, he was wounded in the upper leg resulting in the presentation of the Wound Badge in Black (Verwundetenabzeichen in Schwarz) on 26 May.

On 21 July, II. Gruppe moved to an airfield at Novy Cholan located south of Tatsinskaya. In the following days, the Gruppe fought in the Battle of Kalach, supporting the German crossing of the Don. On 24 July, Münster became an "ace-in-a-day" when he shot down five Il-2 ground-attack aircraft and a Hurricane fighter, taking his total to 30 aerial victories claimed. From 21 November 1942 to March 1943, Münster was first hospitalized in Troppau, present-day Opava, where he received surgery and then spent some time convalescing. During this period, he was awarded the Knight's Cross of the Iron Cross (Ritterkreuz des Eisernen Kreuzes) on 21 December 1942 and promoted to Leutnant (second lieutenant). At the time, he had flown 322 combat missions and had claimed 51 aerial victories.

=== Defense of the Reich ===
The increasing daytime attacks of the United States Army Air Forces (USAAF) Eighth Air Force against targets in western Europe forced the Luftwaffe to transfer more and more fighter units from the Eastern Front back to Germany in Defense of the Reich. On 3 August 1943, II. Gruppe's air elements arrived at Uetersen Airfield in northern Germany. Münster was appointed Staffelkapitän (squadron leader) of 5. Staffel of JG 3 on 20 October 1943. He succeeded Hauptmann Heinrich Sannemann who was transferred.

Münster claimed his first aerial victory over the USAAF on 13 November. That day, the Eighth Air Force targeted Bremen and Münster was credited with shooting down a Boeing B-17 Flying Fortress bomber. On 24 April 1944, Münster was temporarily put in command of II. Gruppe after its former commander Hauptmann Hermann Freiherr von Kap-herr was killed in action. Münster surrendered command to Hauptmann Gustav Frielinghaus at Gardelegen Airfield on 1 May. Since Frielinghaus was still convalescing from injuries sustained in December 1943, Frielinghaus led the Gruppe from the ground while Münster continued to lead in the air.

On 8 May, Münster was killed in a mid-air collision with a Consolidated B-24 Liberator bomber, possibly from the 445th Bombardment Group. His Messerschmitt Bf 109 G-6/U4 (Werknummer 441142—factory number) crashed near Wöllersheim, present-day part of Lamspringe, approximately 18 kilometers (11 miles) south-southeast of Hildesheim. Münster was replaced by Leutnant Hans Grünberg as commander of 5. Staffel. Münster was posthumously awarded the 471st Knight's Cross of the Iron Cross with Oak Leaves (Ritterkreuz des Eisernen Kreuzes mit Eichenlaub) on 12 May 1944. On 20 May, he was given a military funeral in his hometown Pohorsch.

== Summary of career ==
=== Aerial victory claims ===
According to US historian David T. Zabecki, Münster was credited with 95 aerial victories. Spick also lists Münster with 95 aerial victories claimed in an unknown number of combat missions. This figure includes 70 aerial victories on the Eastern Front, and further 25 victories over the Western Allies, including eight heavy bombers. According to Obermaier, Münster flew over 500 combat missions. Mathews and Foreman, authors of Luftwaffe Aces — Biographies and Victory Claims, researched the German Federal Archives and found records for 86 aerial victory claims, plus six further unconfirmed claims. This figure includes 72 aerial victories on the Eastern Front and 14 over the Western Allies, including 10 heavy bombers.

Victory claims were logged to a map-reference (PQ = Planquadrat), for example "PQ 39411". The Luftwaffe grid map (Jägermeldenetz) covered all of Europe, western Russia and North Africa and was composed of rectangles measuring 15 minutes of latitude by 30 minutes of longitude, an area of about 360 square miles (930 km^{2}). These sectors were then subdivided into 36 smaller units to give a location area 3 km × 4 km (1.9 mi × 2.5 mi) in size.

Chronicle of aerial victories
This and the ♠ (Ace of spades) indicates those aerial victories which made Münster an "ace-in-a-day", a term which designates a fighter pilot who has shot down five or more airplanes in a single day. This along with the * (asterisk) indicates an Herausschuss (separation shot)—a severely damaged heavy bomber forced to separate from his combat box which was counted as an aerial victory. This and the ? (question mark) indicates information discrepancies listed by Prien, Stemmer, Rodeike, Bock, Mathews and Foreman.
Claim	Date	Time	Type	Location	Claim	Date	Time	Type	Location
– 4. Staffel of Jagdgeschwader 3 "Udet" – Operation Barbarossa — 22 June – September 1941
1	6 July 1941	14:52	ZKB-19 (DB-3)		6	31 August 1941	13:03	V-11 (Il-2)	
2	9 July 1941	16:12	DB-3	northwest of Gudnow	7	1 September 1941	17:02	I-153	
3	9 July 1941	16:16	DB-3	northwest of Gudnow	8	6 September 1941	16:55	SB-3	10 km (6.2 mi) southwest of Koselschtsche
4	8 August 1941	06:35	Il-2		9	13 September 1941	17:24	V-11 (Il-2)	
5	26 August 1941	12:40	I-153						
– Stab II. Gruppe of Jagdgeschwader 3 "Udet" – Operation Barbarossa — October – 1 November 1941
10? (Note: This claim is not listed by Mathews and Foreman.)	17 October 1941	—	I-16		12?	23 October 1941	—	I-16	
11	23 October 1941	14:55	I-16	7 km (4.3 mi) southwest of Boj-Kosak					
– 4. Staffel of Jagdgeschwader 3 "Udet" – Mediterranean Theater — 7 January – 26 April 1942
13	22 February 1942	14:30	Hurricane	4 km (2.5 mi) northeast of Luqa					
– 4. Staffel of Jagdgeschwader 3 "Udet" – Eastern Front — 26 April 1942 – 3 February 1943
14	20 May 1942	07:57	MiG-1	west of Rubizhne	33	28 July 1942	09:47	Il-2	PQ 39411, Kalach; 5 km (3.1 mi) southeast of Kalach
15	20 May 1942	08:05	Il-2	Grasskoje	34	28 July 1942	10:05	Il-2	PQ 39821; 10 km (6.2 mi) west of Shutow
16	24 June 1942	14:15	Il-2		35	30 July 1942	07:17	MiG-1	PQ 39424; 15 km (9.3 mi) southwest of Pitomnik
17	24 June 1942	18:20	MiG-1		36	30 July 1942	13:07	MiG-1	PQ 392
18	26 June 1942	08:45	MiG-1		37	4 August 1942	15:45	Il-2	PQ 48131
19	30 June 1942	12:48	Yak-1		38	4 August 1942	15:55	Il-2	PQ 49644
20	30 June 1942	12:53? (Note: According to Mathews and Foreman claimed at 12:52.)	Yak-1		39	5 August 1942	04:37	LaGG-3	PQ 49732
21	5 July 1942	07:55	Il-2		40	6 August 1942	06:53	LaGG-3	PQ 39533; 15 km (9.3 mi) northeast of Kletskaya
22	5 July 1942	07:57	Il-2		41	7 August 1942	17:45	Pe-2	PQ 4955
23	23 July 1942	09:45	LaGG-3		42	7 August 1942	17:48	Pe-2	3 km (1.9 mi) east of Klischewskij
24	23 July 1942	15:05	LaGG-3	southwest of Kosalinskaja	43	9 August 1942	05:25	Il-2	PQ 39443; 15 km (9.3 mi) south-southeast of Kalach
25♠	24 July 1942	06:15	Il-2		44	18 August 1942	06:51	I-16	PQ 30242
26♠	24 July 1942	06:17	Hurricane		45	23 August 1942	08:45	LaGG-3	PQ 49144; 10 km (6.2 mi) northeast of Pitomnik
27♠	24 July 1942	13:22	Il-2		46	23 September 1942	07:09	MiG-1	PQ 57112
28♠	24 July 1942	13:24	Il-2		47	23 September 1942	07:12	MiG-1	PQ 47251
29♠	24 July 1942	13:34	Il-2		48	7 October 1942	15:57	LaGG-3	PQ 38741
30♠	24 July 1942	18:15	Il-2		49	7 October 1942	15:59	LaGG-3	PQ 38742
31	27 July 1942	07:10	Il-2	PQ 3942, south of Dubinskij	50	23 October 1942	13:19	Pe-2	PQ 38121; 15 km (9.3 mi) north-northeast of Kotelnikovo
32	28 July 1942	09:46	Il-2	PQ 39332; 10 km (6.2 mi) southwest of Kalach	51	31 October 1942	15:57	Il-2	PQ 18232
– 4. Staffel of Jagdgeschwader 3 "Udet" – Eastern Front — March – 3 August 1943
52	10 March 1943	10:07	I-16? (Note: According to Mathews and Foreman claimed as an Ilyushin Il-2.)	PQ 35 Ost 70763, east of Izium; 10 km (6.2 mi) southeast of Izium	65	8 May 1943	11:51	Il-2	PQ 34 Ost 75233, west of Krymskaya vicinity of Krymsk
53	18 March 1943	13:25	LaGG-3	PQ 35 Ost 60532, vicinity of Werchnjaja-Bishkin vicinity of Schepilinski	66	8 May 1943	12:04	LaGG-3	PQ 34 Ost 75291, Neberdshajewskaja; 15 km (9.3 mi) southwest of Krymsk
54	19 March 1943	10:16	Pe-2? (Note: According to Mathews and Foreman claimed as an Yakovlev Yak-7.)	PQ 35 Ost 60212, northeast of Roganj; 15 km (9.3 mi) north of Malinovka	67	8 May 1943	12:07	LaGG-3	PQ 34 Ost 75261, west of Krymskaya vicinity of Krymsk
55	21 March 1943	15:04	La-5	PQ 34 Ost 98512, west of Rostov; 10 km (6.2 mi) west of Rostov	68	8 May 1943	12:10	LaGG-3	PQ 34 Ost 75242, north of Bakanskij; 15 km (9.3 mi) east of Anapa
56	27 March 1943	11:08	I-180 (Yak-1)	PQ 34 Ost 98881, south of Rostov; 20 km (12 mi) south of Rostov	69	23 May 1943	06:51	La-5	PQ 35 Ost 61154, vicinity of Sawidowka; 10 km (6.2 mi) north of Krasnyi Lyman
57	27 March 1943	11:17	I-180?	PQ 34 Ost 98872, south of Azov; 15 km (9.3 mi) southeast of Azov	70	1 June 1943	05:04	LaGG-3	PQ 35 Ost 61773, 7 km (4.3 mi) southwest of Valuyki; 10 km (6.2 mi) southwest of Urazovo
58	20 April 1943	10:05	Boston	PQ 34 Ost 75454, south of Novorossiysk; Black Sea, 15 km (9.3 mi) southwest of Kabardinka	71	6 June 1943	17:15	La-5	PQ 35 Ost 60293, south of Pechenihy; 20 km (12 mi) east-southeast of Malinovka
59	20 April 1943	10:07	Il-2	PQ 34 Ost 75414, west of Novorossiysk; Black Sea, 15 km (9.3 mi) southwest of Kabardinka	72	6 June 1943	17:20	La-5	PQ 35 Ost 60412, vicinity of Skripai; 15 km (9.3 mi) south of Malinovka
60	20 April 1943	10:08	Il-2	PQ 34 Ost 75411, west of Novorossiysk; 10 km (6.2 mi) north of Kabardinka	73	9 June 1943	16:19	Yak-1	PQ 35 Ost 61134, Werchopneje; 10 km (6.2 mi) west of Prokhorovka
61	20 April 1943	10:09	Il-2	PQ 34 Ost 75424, Novorossiysk vicinity of Novorossiysk	74	9 June 1943	16:22	La-5	PQ 35 Ost 61133, Werchopneje; 10 km (6.2 mi) west of Prokhorovka
62	24 April 1943	05:38	I-16	PQ 34 Ost 85144, west of Abinskaya west of Abinsk	75	16 June 1943	17:02	La-5	PQ 35 Ost 60451, Woltshij Jar; 20 km (12 mi) south-southeast of Malinovka
63	28 April 1943	09:22	LaGG-3	PQ 34 Ost 85112, north of Mertschanskaja south of Cholmskaja	76? (Note: This claim is not listed in the 2008 book by Prien, Stemmer, Rodeike and Bock, nor is it listed by Mathews and Foreman. However, the claim is listed in the 2003 book by Prien and Stemmer as his 76th aerial victory.)	23 June 1943	17:25	unknown	
64	7 May 1943	16:27	I-16	PQ 34 Ost 86814, northwest of Krasnodar					
– 4. Staffel of Jagdgeschwader 3 "Udet" – Defense of the Reich — 1 September – 20 October 1943
77	4 October 1943	13:07	B-17	PQ 05 Ost S/OO/PN; Daun-Wittlich	79	10 October 1943	15:06	B-17	12 km (7.5 mi) northwest of Münster
78	9 October 1943	13:50	B-17	70 km (43 mi) north of Terschelling	80	10 October 1943	15:08	B-17	18 km (11 mi) west of Münster
– 5. Staffel of Jagdgeschwader 3 "Udet" – Defense of the Reich — 21 October – 31 December 1943
81	13 November 1943	13:38	B-17	PQ 05 Ost S/TC-5; 100 km (62 mi) west of IJmuiden	83	29 November 1943	14:30	P-38	PQ 05 Ost S/GN-6/5; Nijverdal-Raalte
82	29 November 1943	14:28	P-38	PQ 05 Ost S/FN-1/9; Giethoorn-Ommen	84? (Note: This claim is not listed in the 2008 book by Prien, Stemmer, Rodeike and Bock. However, the claim is listed in 2003 book by Prien and Stemmer as his 84th aerial victory. According to Mathews and Foreman this claim is unconfirmed.)	11 December 1943	—	B-17*	
– 5. Staffel of Jagdgeschwader 3 "Udet" – Defense of the Reich — 1 January – 8 May 1944
85? (Note: According to Mathews and Foreman this claim is unconfirmed, while this claim is not listed in the 2018 book by Prien, Stemmer and Bock)	20 February 1944	13:45~	B-24	Salzgitter-Goslar-Holzminden	91	4 March 1944	13:25	P-51	Brandenburg
86?	20 February 1944	13:45~	B-24	Salzgitter-Goslar-Holzminden	92	8 March 1944	13:37	B-17	10 km (6.2 mi) north of Burg
87?	20 February 1944	13:45~	B-24	Salzgitter-Goslar-Holzminden	93	11 April 1944	11:07	B-17	PQ 15 Ost S/HB-1 south of Braunschweig
88?	21 February 1944	15:05~	P-51		94	8 May 1944	10:15	B-17	Hildesheim west of Braunschweig
89	24 February 1944	13:34	B-24	PQ 15 Ost S/NA-8; Eschwege-Bad Neustadt	95	8 May 1944	—	B-24*	Hildesheim
90	4 March 1944	13:11	B-17	east of Stendal					

=== Awards ===
- Iron Cross (1939)
  - 2nd Class (24 July 1941)
  - 1st Class (7 September 1941)
- Front Flying Clasp of the Luftwaffe for Fighter Pilots in Gold (16 December 1941)
- Wound Badge in Black (26 May 1942)
- Honor Goblet of the Luftwaffe on 13 September 1942 as Feldwebel and pilot
- German Cross in Gold on 3 October 1942 as Feldwebel in the 4./Jagdgeschwader 3
- Knight's Cross of the Iron Cross with Oak Leaves
  - Knight's Cross on 21 December 1942 as Feldwebel and pilot in the II./Jagdgeschwader 3 "Udet"
  - 471st Oak Leaves on 12 May 1944 as Leutnant (war officer) and Staffelkapitän of the 4./Jagdgeschwader 3 "Udet" (Note: According to Scherzer as Staffelkapitän of the 5./Jagdgeschwader 3 "Udet".)
