= Lajos Lóczy =

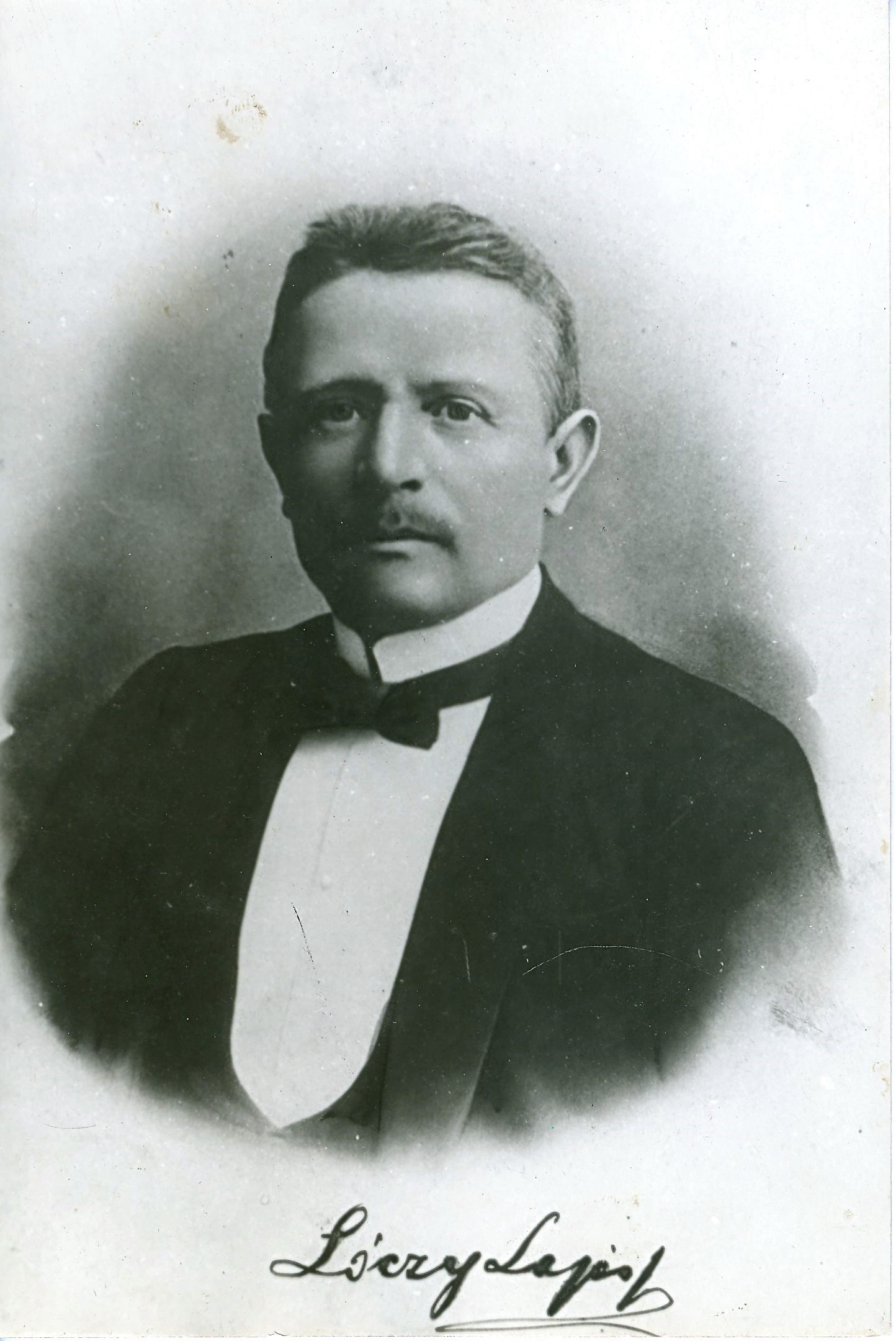
Lajos Lóczy

Lajos Lóczy Germanized as Ludwig von Lóczy (4 November 1849 – 13 May 1920) was a Hungarian geologist, paleontologist, and explorer. He was a professor of geology at the University of Budapest from 1886 and directed the Hungarian Geological Institute from 1908. His son Lajos Lóczy (1891-1980) also became a geologist.

== Biography ==
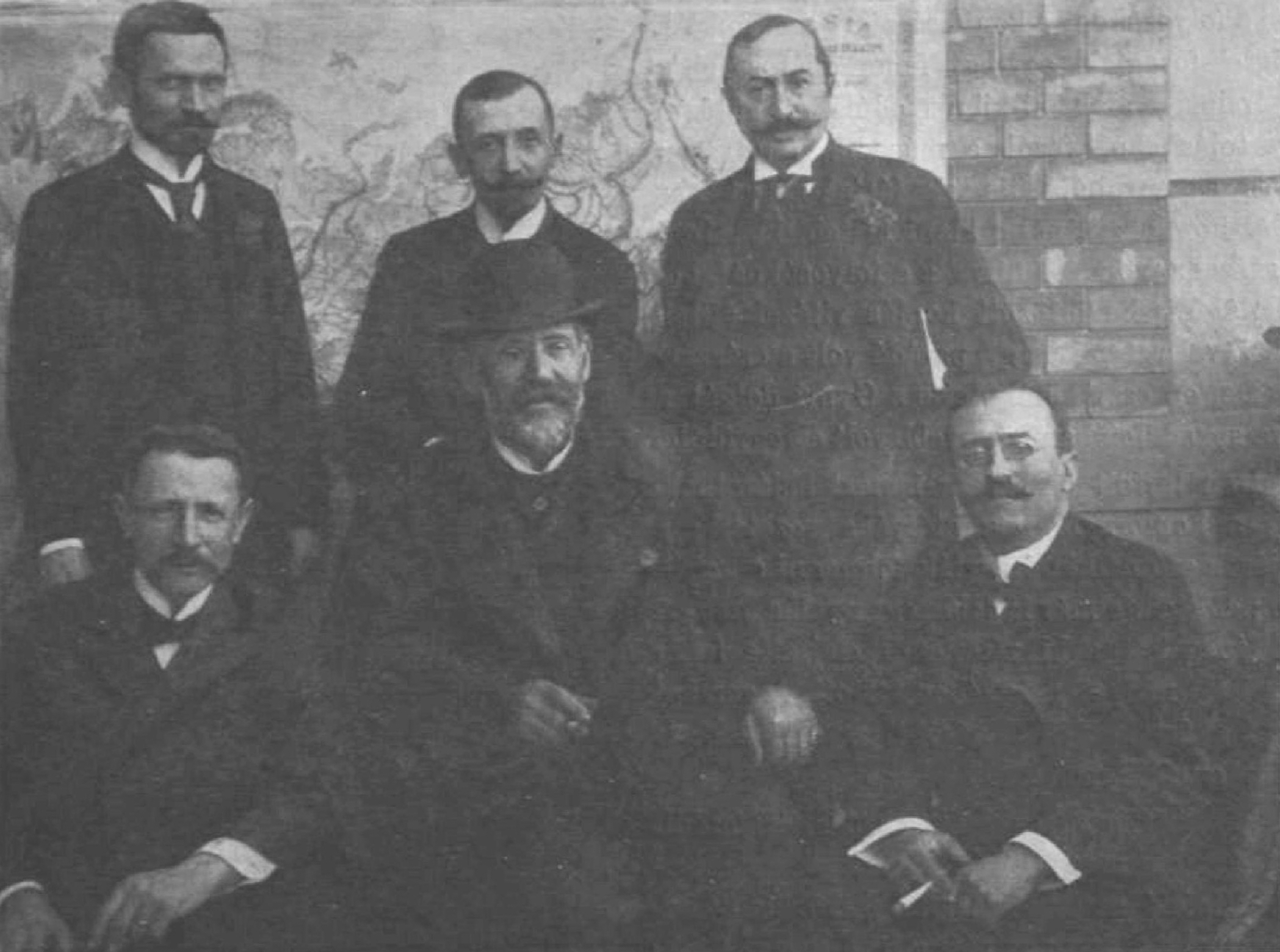
Lóczy (seated left) with Sven Hedin and others, 1903

Lóczy was born in Preßburg (Pozsony) to Sándor and Mária Kuhn. The family had noble origins in Gömör county. He graduated from a local school in Arad and went to Zurich polytechnic in 1870 receiving an engineering diploma. His teachers included Gustav Adolf, Kenn Gott, Arnold Escher von der Lindt and Albert Heim. He became a curator of minerals at the Hungarian national museum in 1874 and in 1877 he took part in an expedition to China led by Béla Széchenyi and published two volumes of the scientific results of the expedition in 1890 describing the Gobi desert and the Hwang Ho basin. He identified the thrust sheets and tectonic windows of the region also described fossils from the region. He later worked on the geology of Lake Balaton establishing a research institute on the lake along the lines of the Naples research station. He explored the Hegyes-Drócsa region in 1876-77. He became a professor at the University of Budapest in 1886 and director of the Hungarian Geological Institute from 1908 to 1919. Around 1893 he was involved in explorations for oil in Câmpina. In 1907 he explored for potash in Transylvania which led to a discovery of gas fields in Mezőség. His students included Teleki Pál, Jenő Cholnoky, Baron Ferenc Nopcsa, Dezső Laczkó, Hugó Böckh, and István Vitalís.

Lóczy received the gold medal of the Royal Geographical Society of which he was an honorary member. He was also awarded by the Berlin Geographical Society and the French Academy of Sciences. He died at Balatonfüred. A medal was instituted in his memory by the Hungarian Geographical Society.
