= Kázsmárk =

Coordinates: 48°17′N 20°59′E

- Village
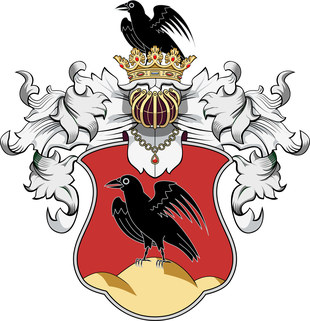
- Seal
- Interactive map of Kázsmárk
- Country: Hungary
- Regions: Northern Hungary
- County: Borsod-Abaúj-Zemplén County
- Time zone: UTC+1 (CET)
  - Summer (DST): UTC+2 (CEST)

Kázsmárk is a village in Borsod-Abaúj-Zemplén County in northeastern Hungary.

== Notable residents ==
- János Fogarasi (1801–1878), jurist and philologist
- Tamás Péchy (1828–1897), politician
