= Ferdinand Ulrich =

German philosopher and professor (1931–2020)

- Born: 23 February 1931; Odry, Czechoslovakia
- Died: 11 February 2020 (aged 88)

Philosophical work
- Era: Contemporary philosophy
- Region: Western philosophy
- School: Continental philosophy Phenomenology; Existentialism
- Main interests: History of Philosophy; Metaphysics; Ontology; Philosophical anthropology; Philosophy of dialogue; Faith and rationality; Philosophy of religion
- Notable ideas: Being as love

Ferdinand Ulrich (23 February 1931 – 11 February 2020) was a German Catholic philosopher and professor at the University of Regensburg from 1960 to 1996.

== Life ==
Ulrich studied philosophy, psychology, pedagogy, and fundamental theology at the Freising College and the Ludwig-Maximilians-Universität München. In 1956, he completed his doctorate in philosophy in Munich. In 1959, he completed his Habilitation in philosophy at the University of Salzburg. He worked as a private lecturer in 1960, and in 1961 as associate professor at the Pedagogical College of Regensburg, which would later be integrated into the University of Regensburg. In 1967, he was appointed ordinary Professor of Philosophy. Ulrich also taught at the University of Salzburg (from 1963) and at the Jesuit School of Philosophy in Pullach (later Munich). In 1996, he became professor emeritus. Ulrich died on February 11, 2020, at the age of 89 after a brief illness. Bishop Stefan Oster eulogized him on his social media account noting that Ulrich was similar to John the Baptist in that he "never wanted to point to anyone else than the one who is the light of the world."

== Work ==
The constitution and environment of the concrete man as human being-in-the-world always stands at the center of Ulrich's thinking and questioning. At the same time, however, this view of man always comes to Ulrich out of the depths of a philosophy of being which characterizes all his writing. In everything he considers, he is always and originally a metaphysician who perceives and unfolds the phenomenon of human existence in light of the "drama of the question of being.” This philosophy of being is particularly inspired by the spirit of Thomas Aquinas, who interprets being as the abundant act of all reality. Ulrich unfolds from this an enduring dialogue, especially with German idealism (above all Hegel) and Martin Heidegger, but also with Marx, Kierkegaard, Freud, and others, always in light of a metaphysics of being as love (or as gift). He thus understands himself as an explicitly Christian philosopher. From these assumptions, he succeeds in reconciling traditional metaphysics and modern transcendental philosophy on the one hand, but also reconciling these positions with dialogical philosophy on the other. Ulrich's thought circles in manifold variations around the ontological difference between non-subsistent being and subsisting beings. He sees the full form, and thus the actual interpretive horizon, of this difference in the personal difference of I and Thou. Ontology and anthropology, therefore, are integrally related to each other without being confused. With his radical understanding of being as love, Ulrich stands both in the tradition of those who would overcome metaphysics, especially metaphysics in the form of a static substance ontology, and in the tradition of those who would (for example, with Heidegger), bring their metaphysics back to its ground out of the profound experience of being in the philosophy of the great tradition. This philosophy of being as love, however, always has the salvation of human existence in view. For Ulrich, liberated thought is possible only in the place in which the man is freed for this personhood: in the place of the arrival of the liberator, in the realm of redeemed freedom or the “salvation of finitude,” which Ulrich sees as the personal embodiment of the Church.

=== Publications ===
Ulrich's thought is collected in a series from Johannes-Verlag Einsiedeln, currently five volumes, but growing. However, after 1980, Ulrich published hardly any new texts. The current series is composed for the most part of older manuscripts Ulrich has revised. The first volume, Ulrich's central work, is his Habilitation, Homo Abyssus: Das Wagnis der Seinsfrage (first published 1961). In the fifth volume of the new series, Gabe und Vergebung, Ulrich presents a “contribution to biblical ontology” in which, over 830 pages, he describes the parable of the prodigal son (Lk 15:11–32) as an onto-drama between God and man. Further publications include about 60 essays, and occasionally extensive treatises, for the most part published in foreign publications and collections. Some shorter books are Der Mensch als Anfang. Zur philosophischen Anthropologie der Kindheit (1970) and Atheismus und Menschwerdung (1966).

=== Reception ===
The speculative difficulty, idiosyncratic diction, and Christian foundations of Ulrich's philosophy have perhaps limited the scope of its reception. Certainly, though, there has been scattered and very remarkable engagement. Hans Urs von Balthasar, for example, carried out a deep engagement with Ulrich's work, and rendered the following verdict in a letter to Ulrich on the publication of Homo Abyssus: "It has one great advantage over all the other ontologies with which I am familiar: It stands in intimate contact with the mysteries of revelation, offers an access to them, and yet never abandons the strictly philosophical domain. In this sense, it overcomes the baneful dualism between philosophy and theology, and it does so perhaps more successfully than ever before.” In a more recent collected edition on the philosophy of religion, Ulrich was called "the most important religious philosopher of the century." Bishop Stefan Oster of Passau is a self-proclaimed student of Ulrich.

== Works ==
- I: Homo abyssus. Das Wagnis der Seinsfrage. 2nd ed. Einsiedeln, Switzerland: Johannes Verlag, 1998. ISBN 3-89411-284-0. (Zugleich Salzburg Dissertation 1958 u.d.T.: Versuch einer spekulativen Entfaltung des Menschenwesens in der Seinsteilhabe.)
- II: Leben in der Einheit von Leben und Tod. Einsiedeln, Switzerland: Johannes Verlag, 1999. ISBN 3-89411-358-8
- III: Erzählter Sinn. Ontologie der Selbstwerdung in der Bilderwelt des Märchens. 2nd ed. Einsiedeln, Switzerland: Johannes Verlag, 2002.ISBN 3-89411-362-6
- IV: Logo-tokos. Der Mensch und das Wort. Einsiedeln 2003. ISBN 3-89411-383-9
- V: Gabe und Vergebung. Ein Beitrag zur biblischen Ontologie. Einsiedeln, Switzerland: Johannes Verlag, 2006. ISBN 3-89411-392-8 (Review by Richard Niedermeier).
- Gegenwart der Freiheit. Einsiedeln, Switzerland: Johannes Verlag, 1974. ISBN 3-265-10154-1 (Sammlung Horizonte; N.F. 8), 1974.
- Der Mensch als Anfang: zur philosophischen Anthropologie der Kindheit. Einsiedeln, Switzerland: Johannes Verlag, 1970. (Kriterien 16).

== Works in English Translation ==
- Homo Abyssus: The Drama of the Question of Being. Translated by D.C. Schindler. Washington, D.C.: Humanum Academic, 2018. ISBN 978-1948195010.
