= Julius Wiesner =

Austrian botanist (1838–1916)

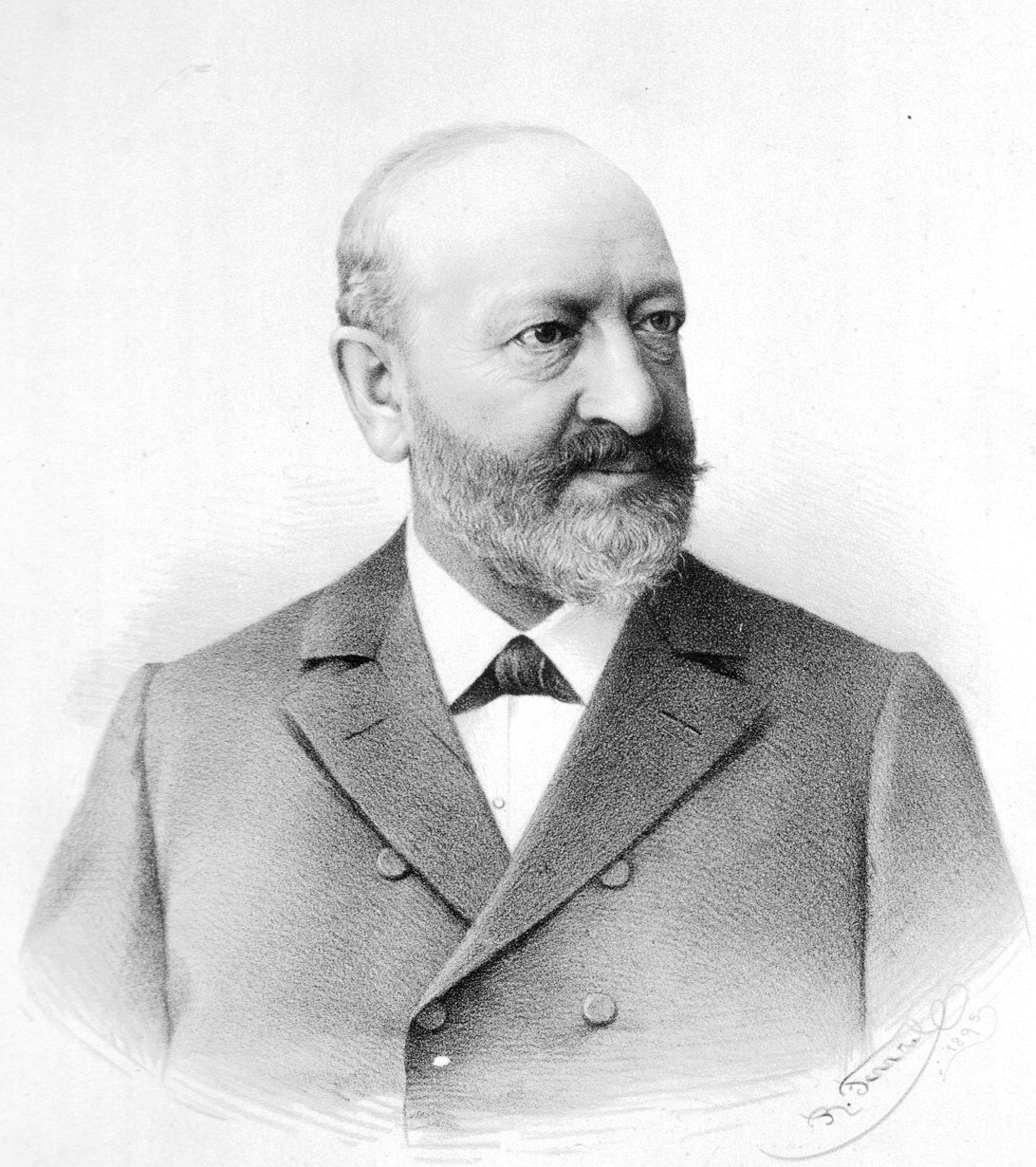
Julius Wiesner in 1895.

Julius Ritter von Wiesner (20 January 1838 – 9 October 1916) was a professor of botany at the University of Vienna, a pioneer of experimental botany and a specialist in the physiology and anatomy of plants. He was awarded hereditary knighthood in 1909.

== Early life ==
Wiesner was born in Moravia and grew up in Brno. His father Karl was the son of businessman and his mother was Rosa Deutsch. After school he went to university in Vienna and Jena where he did his doctoral research under Matthias J. Schleiden (1804–1881). His teachers included Eduard Fenzl (1808–1879) and Franz Unger (1800–1870) but he was also influenced by the physiologist Ernst Brücke (1819–1892). He qualified as a teacher in 1861.

== Career ==
In 1870 Wiesner became a professor at the forestry academy of Mariabrunn, and from 1873 to 1909, was a professor of plant anatomy and physiology at the University of Vienna, and at the same time (1866 to 1880) had a teaching position of technical commodity science at the Vienna University of Technology. At Vienna he founded the department of plant physiology (1873). During his career, he took part in scientific expeditions to Egypt, India, Java, Sumatra, North America and the Arctic. He served as rector of the University from 1898 to 1899.

Wiesner followed an experimental approach to plant physiology. His research included studies on phototropism in plants, on the formation of chlorophyll. and investigations involving the technological properties of plant raw materials.

Recognised as an accomplished botanist and author of German language books and papers — his 1881 work on the movement in plants was read and discussed by Charles Darwin — the genus Wiesneria commemorates his name. His son Friedrich Wiesner became a diplomat.

Wiesner died in 1916 and was buried in the Grinzinger Cemetery and marble memorial was erected at the University of Vienna in December 1927. This memorial was demolished in 1938 because of his Jewish origins.

== Selected works ==
- Die Entstehung des Chlorophylls in der Pflanze, 1877 – The formation of chlorophyll in plants.
- Die Heliotropischen Erscheinungen im Pflanzenreiche, 1878 – The heliotropic phenomena in the plant kingdom.
- Das Bewegungsvermögen der Pflanzen : eine kritische Studie über das gleichnamige Werk von Charles Darwin nebst neuen Untersuchungen, 1881 – The power of movement in plants, a critical study of the homonymous work of Charles Darwin, together with new studies.
- Elemente der Wissenschaftlichen Botanik, 1881-84 (two volumes) – Elements of scientific botany.
- Die Rohstoffe des Pflanzenreiches, 1900-03 (two volumes) – Raw materials of the plant kingdom.
