= Louis de Loczy =

- Born: June 5, 1891; Budapest, Austria-Hungary
- Died: June 9, 1980 (aged 89); Rio de Janeiro, Brazil
- Education: University of Zurich
- Known for: Plate tectonics, structural geology, petroleum geology
- Scientific career
- Fields: Geologist
- Workplaces: Geological Survey of Hungary, University of Budapest, University of Bahia

Louis de Loczy (June 5, 1891, in Budapest, Hungary – June 9, 1980, in Rio de Janeiro, Brazil) was a Hungarian geologist. He was the son of Lajos Lóczy, probably the most famous Hungarian geologist. Lajos de Loczy was the first western geologist to describe the structure, geomorphology and stratigraphy of mountain chains bordering the Tibetan Plateau that links the Kunlun Mountains with the north-south-oriented belt of mountains and gorges in central China.

== Early career ==
Inspired by his father's work, Louis de Loczy pursued eagerly his undergraduate course of geology in the University of Zurich, the famous E.T.H. (Eidgenossische Technische Hochschule) where he also got his Ph.D. in 1919. He studied further with the famous tectonicist Maurice Lugeon at the University of Lausanne. Loczy joined in 1920 the Geological Survey of Hungary. He was assigned the mission of geological mapping in parts of his country. From 1922 onwards he worked under contract with Royal Dutch Shell, when he carried out geological exploration in Sumatra, Java, Borneo, Timor and Celebes (presently Indonesia); and also in Ecuador, Peru, Romania, Yugoslavia, Polonia and Hungary. In 1926 he followed in his father's footsteps by becoming the chair of Geology at the University of Budapest.

On September 14, 1926 he married Madeleine Gomperz. They had a son, Lajos, born in 1929 in Budapest. de Loczy was Director of the Geological Institute of Hungary until 1933. During this time he devoted himself to education and training of Hungarian students of geology and with this team discovered the oil fields as well as the deposits of bauxite, iron and manganese ores, and coal. His group in the Institute under his direction helped to launch the projects of irrigation of the Hungarian plains and location of dam sites in the valley of Wagg, then part of Czechoslovakia.

== Post World War II ==
After World War II by the suggestion of Professor Martonne he executed geological exploration in the French Morocco for the Societé Chérifiennne des Petroles. He worked during 3 years for the Maden Tetkikvo Arama Enstitusu, at Ankara. During this time he did geological explorations in the Adama Basin and in the southeast of Anatolia and contributed significantly for the development of the oil field of Raman Dagh. While de Loczy was working abroad the Hungarian Communist revolution began and he was urged to return immediately to his country under the threat of confiscation of his estates, money assets and even his nationality. Since de Loczy was not formally warned about these threats, he continued his work abroad. However, the threats soon became a reality.

Even after these losses, de Loczy carried on with his research in numerous parts of the world. From 1950 to 1951 as a consultant to the Institute of Soil Research of the Ministry of Coordination of Greece, Loczy carried out geological mapping and oil exploration in West Tratia, Epyrus. About this time he gave an advanced course in geological sciences for the Hellenic geologists. He was a delegate of the Institute of Soil Research of Greece in the 1951 Petroleum World Congress. By the end of 1951 he was hired by the Government of Paraguay to execute geological work in Asunción aimed at solving hydrogeological problems in that country.

== Career in Brazil ==
Also in 1951, the Conselho Nacional de Petroleo do Brasil (CNP) hired him to start an exploration geological program in the Paraná Basin. With the creation of PETROBRÁS, the Brazilian State Petroleum Company, he became a consultant geologist and in 1954 he took charge of the geological exploration program in the states of Santa Catarina and Paraná. In 1957 he was invited to teach historical geology in the Geological Course of Petrobrás in a covenant with the University of Bahia (UFBa). In 1958 he proceeded with the geological exploration study in the Paraná Basin and starts a similar one in the large Amazon Basin. In the end of 1958 his contract with PETROBRÁS ends and he soon gets a position for 1959 with the National Iranian Oil Company. He was able to combine this function with the one of professor of Advanced Geology with emphasis in petroleum exploration at the University of Tehran. In the meantime, the Brazilian Commission of Nuclear Research and the School of Geology of the University of Rio de Janeiro succeeded in attracting him to come to Brazil to teach Structural Geology and Tectonics in the cited institutions.

de Loczy became a naturalized Brazilian and established his residence in Rio de Janeiro. As a professor of the School of Geology he used his university holidays for field work, always taking with him students and collaborators. In the School of Geology hundreds of students passed through his lectures both in classes and the field. He was an active member of the American Association of Petroleum Geologists, USA; Academy of Sciences of Saint Estevan of Budapest; Finnish Geographic Society, Helsinki; Geologische Vereinigung of Stuttgart; Brazilian Geological Society, and Brazilian Society of Paleontology. He was a full member of the Academia Brasileira de Ciências to which he was elected and took oath on May 14, 1968. He participated actively with papers and talks in the geological congresses of Madrid(1926), London, England(1948), Mexico City(1956), India (1964) and in nearly all the Brazilian geological congresses.

His numerous publications deal with structural geology, tectonics and petroleum geology practically on every country he worked. He had an outstanding interest in the building processes of mountain chains particularly the Himalayas, the Alps and the North and South America cordilleras. During the sixties he published most of his synthesis on the geological evolution on the Brazilian Paleozoic sedimentary basins. He also made a major contribution to the first Tectonic Map of South America. He was one of the first geologists to introduce and publish on Plate Tectonics in Brazil and thus caused many polemics during debates with the geosynclinal theory-oriented geologists. In November 1974, de Loczy retired and was honored with a silver plate inscribed with words of gratitude by the faculty, former students and young students in the Institute of Geosciences of UFRJ (which succeeded the former School of Geology). During 1973 and 1974 he was an invited visiting professor to some universities particularly to the Universidade de Brasilia (Unb), during which he created new friends and scientific ties with the faculty of this university. His last work was the preparation of a book he was working on for many years in co-authorship with Professor Eduardo A. Ladeira and published in 1976 Geologia Estrutural e Introdução à Geotectônica (Structural Geology and Introduction to Geotectonics).

== Selected publications ==
- Loczy, L., 1969. "Tectonismo transversal na América do Sul e suas Relações Genéticas com as Zonas de Fratura das Cadeias Meio-Oceânicas." Na. Acad. Bras. Ciênc., v. 42, 185-205.
- Louis de Loczy 1970, "Role of transcurrent faulting in South American tectonic framework; Evidence for separation of South American and African continents before Ordovician time." American Associagion of Petroleum Geologists Bulletin. November; v. 54; no. 11; p. 2111-2119.
- Loczy, L., 1971. "Gondwana Problems in the Light of Recent Paleontologic and Tectonic Recognitions." Anais da Academia Brasileira de Ciências, v. 43, suplemento, 363-386.
- Loczy, L., 1973. "Some problems of the tectonic framework of the Guiana Shield with special regard for the Roraima Formation." Geologische Rundschau, Band. 62, Heft 2, p. 318-342.
- Loczy, L., 1974. "Possibilidades de petróleo e mineralização na Amazônica." Mineração e Metalurgia, n.º 354, Ano XXXVII, p. 6-13.
