= István Széchenyi Chair in International Economics =

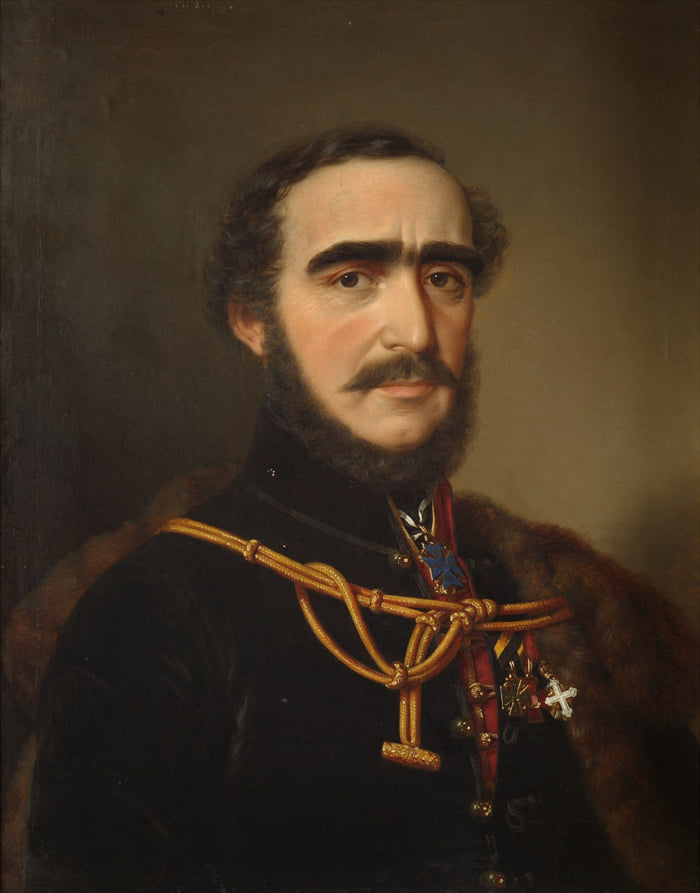
István Széchenyi

The Széchenyi Chair in International Economics is a permanent, endowed position at Quinnipiac University. The mission of the Chair is to oversee, manage and develop the University's relations with Central Eastern Europe, especially Hungary. The main programs overseen by the Széchenyi Chair are the Hungarian American Business Leaders Program (HABL), the QU executive MBA Trip in Hungary, the Hungarians Beyond the Border Scholarship, and the Foreign Lecture Series (as they relate to Central Europe). The position was established in September 2008 by an anonymously donated endowment. The first person appointed to this position is Prof. Christopher Ball, Associate Professor of Economics at Quinnipiac University School of Business.

== Hungarian American Business Leaders Program (HABL) ==
The objective of the Hungarian American Business Leaders (HABL) program is to provide prospective Hungarian students with the opportunity to get exposure to American business practices by means of pursuing MBA studies at Quinnipiac University. The scholarship is a cooperation between the Mathias Corvinus Collegium, Sapientia Hungarian University of Transilvania and Quinnipiac University.

The study-abroad program entails two years of business studies completed with quality internships and a full working year at an American corporation. An executive mentoring program provides Hungarian students the opportunity to discuss career development along with looking for internship and work opportunities. The mentor group is composed of Hungary's leading executives, who guide the students and the program to ensure that students apply their acquired knowledge in a Hungarian market context after they return to their homeland.

== Foreign Lecture Series ==
The above program is designed to provide Quinnipiac's students and faculty with the opportunity to meet with international experts. Speakers pay bi-annual visits to the university campus and hold lectures to the university community in current issues of interest. The list of speakers so far include international political science expert Dr. Alfred Resich, former American ambassador and university professor Dr. Géza Jeszenszky, history professor and foreign policy expert Dr. Tamás Magyarics, management professor Dr. Gyula Bakacsi, former Magyar Nemzeti Bank president Dr. Péter Ákos Bod and E.On Hungária chairman Konrad Kreuzer.

== QU MBA Executive trip to Budapest, Hungary ==
The goal of the QU MBA Executive Trip is to get American business students acquainted with the Hungarian business sphere with the help of high-end executive company visits. The list of companies visited annually so far includes Díjbeszedő Holding Zrt, GE Hungary, LightTech Lamp Technology Ltd., [https://web.archive.org/web/20100628182927/http://www.molgroup.hu/en/ MOL Nyrt., Morgan Stanley Hungary, OTP Bank Zrt and Zwack Unicum Zrt.. Students also get the chance to visit the Hungarian Parliament along with other famous city sites and attend an annual networking event as well.
