= Ödön Széchenyi =

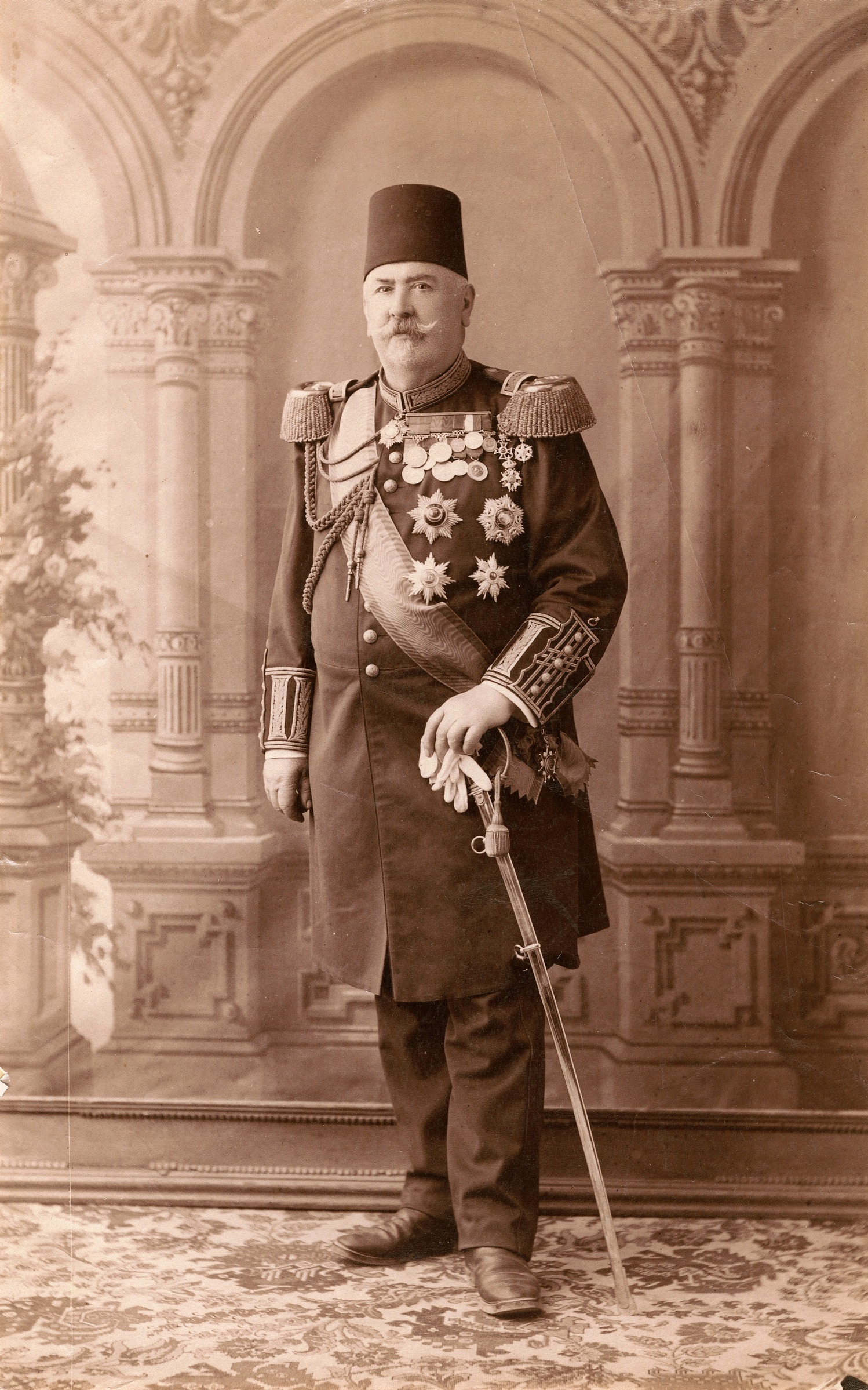
- Photograph by Jean Pascal Sébah and Pollicarpe Joiallier, c. 1900
- Born: 1839; Pozsony, Kingdom of Hungary, Austrian Empire
- Died: 1922 (aged 82–83); Constantinople, Ottoman Empire (modern-day Istanbul, Turkey)
- Burial place: Feriköy Protestant Cemetery, Şişli, Istanbul
- Occupations: Count, Pasha, Firefighter

Ödön Széchenyi (1839 – 1922) was an Imperial Ottoman pasha. He was the son of István Széchenyi and was in charge of the State Fire Brigade in Hungary and the Ottoman Empire.

== Early life ==
Ödön was a member of the noble Széchenyi family in Sárvár-Felsővidék. His father was Count István Széchenyi and his mother was Countess Crescencia von Seilern und Aspang. He was baptized in the parish of St. Martin in Pressburg (Pozsony, today's Bratislava): his godparents were Count Béla Széchenyi and Count Mária Zichy. Ödön moved to Pest at 21, where he worked in different branches of transportation. At this time he obtained a qualification to be a ship officer. He traveled to London for the World's Fair in 1862, where he came into contact with organized firefighting.

== Working in firefighting ==
After the world exhibition, Széchenyi tried to bring firefighting to Hungary. After finding sponsors in Hungary in 1863, he founded the Budapest Voluntary Fire Brigade Association. In 1869, he recruited the National Gymnastics Association to able to begin training with the fire truck he purchased in London. Count Ödön Széchenyi became the first president of the Hungarian National Fire Brigade Association, which was established in the early 1870s. Although Széchenyi was in favor of the introduction of a volunteer fire brigade and worked hard to organize a volunteer fire brigade, from the very beginning of his movement he believed that a firefighter and a mechanic should be paid and a team of six should be hired to clean the machines. The count realized that the voluntary fire brigade alone would not be able to provide fire service properly and impeccably, and as early as 1869 he recommended the establishment of a professional city fire brigade. He took his ideas to the General Assembly and was allowed to begin the organization. Thus, the volunteer and the professional fire brigade both began their service a few days apart. After the 1st of February 1, 1870 the two fire brigades - the volunteer and the professional one - jointly performed the difficult task of firefighting under the headquarters of Count Ödön Széchenyi, who lead the brigades.

== Work in the Ottoman Empire ==
When Ödön visited Constantinople in June 1870, there had just been a devastating fire. The fire burned down the buildings of the English Embassy, the Italian Theater, the American and Portuguese Consulates, the French Baths, the German House of Love, the Armenian Catholic and Roman Catholic Archdiocese buildings. This created pressure to form a fire brigade. As Széchenyi was there, he offered to help set up professional and voluntary fire brigades based on his Hungarian model. Practically nothing happened until 1873 when there were more devastating fires. In 1873, there were many complaints to the Turkish authorities that nothing had happened despite the promises. At the beginning of 1874, the foreign embassies were very strongly advocating the establishment of a fire brigade, and decided their candidate was Széchenyi, whose name was known throughout Europe by that time. The sultan was also under enormous pressure from the Russian ambassador, but he wanted to take Russian fire officers to Constantinople. The Russian ambassador brought in firefighters and gave a large-scale demonstration. Széchenyi also sent for firefighters, who showed their own preparedness a few days after the Russian demonstration. Seeing the precise and customary practice of the disciplined military team, the sultan instructed Széchenyi to set up the Turkish fire brigade in his organization, following the Hungarian model. How worked hard to form a team and equip the fire brigade. He had a fire brigade and a training ground built. The work, which had lasted for years, was so protracted that the Count eventually moved to Constantinople. He built the funicular in the Istanbul-Galata district, which runs there in an underground tunnel. In the meantime, he visited home several times and taught his children in Hungarian. He planned to move home, but did not have the opportunity and the way. The Turkish-Greek War, then the First World War and Trianon wore it, but found joy in the fire department. Even in his old age, he went out to the fires, directing the vaccination. He was esteemed by the alternating Turkish sultans, he received several honors and ranks, he was said to be the first Christian to receive the title of pasha without having to leave his faith and convert to the Muslim faith. Pasha Ödon was one of the highest-ranking generals.

== Children and family ==
Ödön married for the first time in Esztergom on January 10, 1864, when he married Mária Teréz Adelhaid “Irma” Almay (* Lipótváros, Pest, September 19, 1844 - † Vienna, February 19, 1891). 1812–1879). They had two children: Andor Széchenyi and Széchenyi.

His marriage began to deteriorate, eventually Count Ödön Széchenyi moved to the Ottoman Empire and his wife and children to Vienna. After the death of his first wife, he married Miss Christopulos Eulália, in Constantinople. They had four children before their marriage, who were legitimized by it: Olga Széchenyi, Ilona Széchenyi, Gusztáv Ferenc Anastáz Széchenyi Géza, and Bálint Széchenyi Emil Richard Péter.
