= János Fogarasi =

Hungarian jurist and philologist

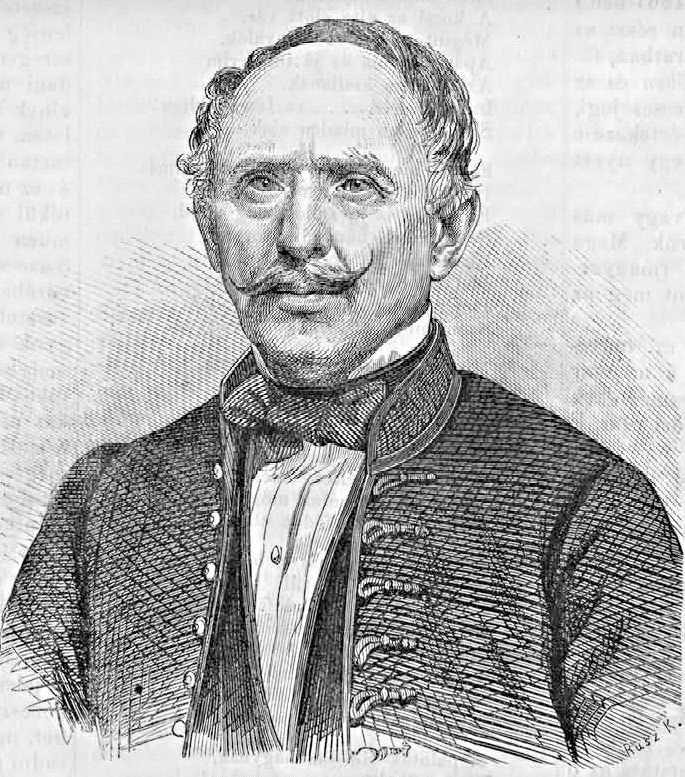
János Fogarasi

János Fogarasi (1801 – 1878) was a Hungarian jurist and philologist, born at Kázsmárk, Borsod-Abaúj-Zemplén County in northeastern Hungary.

In 1829, he was admitted to the bar, in 1848 became Councilor in the Hungarian Finance Ministry, and subsequently President of the Council of Commerce and a judge of the Supreme Court. He wrote on Hungarian jurisprudence and finance (The Hungarian Law of Trade and Exchange, 1840; The Hungarian Bank, 1848), but is best known for the great Dictionary of the Hungarian Language (six volumes, 1861–1874), prepared under the auspices of the Hungarian Academy of Sciences (from 1861 to 1866 in collaboration with Gergely Czuczor). This work is very inclusive and continues to be regarded as standard, despite the fact that it often is at variance with the principles of modern philology.
