= Béla Hadik =

Hungarian-American politician (1905–1971)

- Born: January 31, 1905; Budapest, Austria-Hungary
- Died: February 16, 1971 (aged 66); Camden, South Carolina, U.S.
- Education: Agricultural University of Magyarovar
- Spouse: Countess Alice Széchenyi (m. 1931)
- Children: 2
- Parent(s): Count János Hadik; Countess Alexandra Zichy
- Relatives: Endre Hadik-Barkóczy (uncle); Miksa Hadik (uncle)

Count Béla Hadik von Futak (January 31, 1905 – February 16, 1971) was a Hungarian politician who immigrated to the United States in 1946.

== Early life ==
Hadik was born on January 31, 1905, in Budapest, Hungary. He was the youngest of four children born to Count János Hadik (1863–1933), who was briefly the Prime Minister of the Kingdom of Hungary in October 1918 under Charles IV and his wife, Countess Alexandra Zichy (1873–1949). Among his siblings was Countess Amalia Andrea Johanna Alexandra (who married Louis, Prince of Hohenlohe-Langenburg), Countess Margaret Johanna Maria Gabriella Rafaella Eva Alexandra (who married Count Viktor Wengersky, Baron of Ungerschütz) and Count Anthony Mary Martin Max (who married Edit Gschwindt de Győr).

His paternal grandparents were Count Béla Hadik, a Rear Admiral and Privy Councillor, and Countess Ilona Barkóczy, only daughter and heir of Count János Barkóczy. Among his extended family was uncles Endre Hadik-Barkóczy (Speaker of the House of Magnates) and Miksa Hadik (the Austro-Hungarian Ambassador to Mexico and Sweden). Through his father, he was a great-great-grandson of András Hadik de Futak, famous for capturing the Prussian capital Berlin during the Seven Years' War. His uncle, Count Alexander Hadik, was rumored to have been engaged to Alice Claypoole Vanderbilt, the widow of Cornelius Vanderbilt II (his eventual wife's maternal grandparents), in 1908, but the marriage never happened.

He graduated from the Agricultural University of Magyarovar.

== Career ==
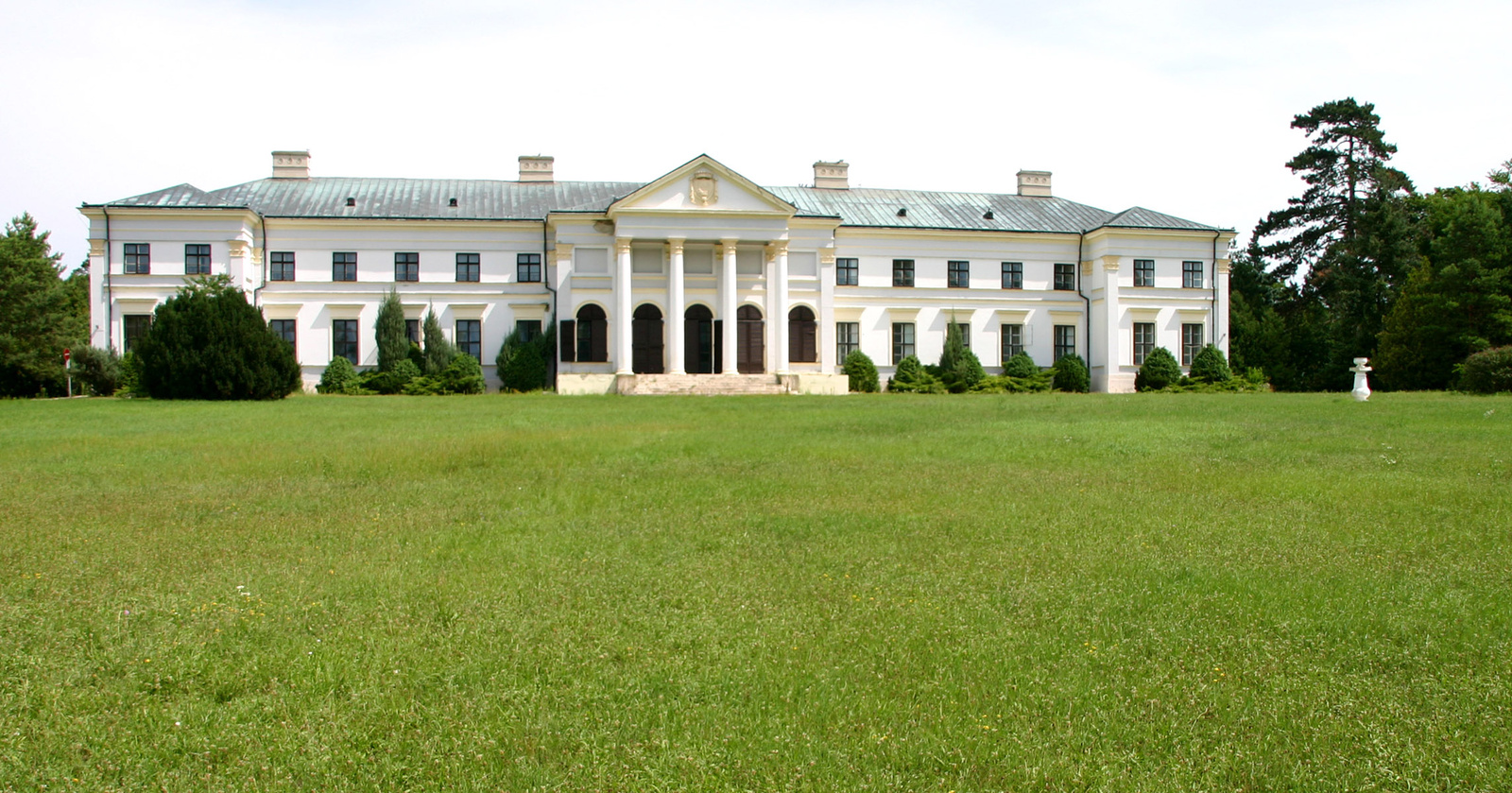
The 1821 Zichy–Hadik Palace in Seregélyes, Fejér.

He was a member of the upper chamber of the Diet of Hungary, the House of Magnates, in prewar Hungary and during World War II, served as a lieutenant of Hungarian cavalry. He was made a Knight of the Order of the Golden Fleece of the House of Habsburg.

After his marriage, he took over management of the family estate and palace in Seregélyes.

In 1945, Hadik and his family left Hungary and in 1946, they moved to the United States and lived in Chester, New Hampshire, where they bought a house from his wife's cousin Bill Vanderbilt. In Chester, he founded the Futaki Kennels and bred Vizsla pointers. Hadik ran dogs in national and regional field trials, and bred and trained several champions, including Futaki Darocz.

== Personal life ==
On April 18, 1931, Hadik married Countess Alice Széchényi (1911–1974). She was the daughter of Count László Széchenyi, the former Hungarian Minister to the U.S., and his American born-wife, Countess Gladys Vanderbilt Széchenyi (daughter of Alice Claypoole Gwynne and Cornelius Vanderbilt II), who visited Hungary almost every summer with their five daughters. The wedding took place at St. Matthew's Church in Washington, D.C. and was officiated by the Most Rev. Pietro Fumasoni Biondi, the Apostolic Delegate to the United States (who later became a Cardinal in 1933), followed by a reception at the Hungarian Legation. As a wedding gift to Alice, his mother sent a "diamond necklace with earrings to match, which had been the gift of the Empress, Queen Maria Theresa, to an ancestor of the bride and bridegroom." A few weeks after their wedding, his wife was stricken with appendicitis, but recovered. Alice's younger sister later married, and divorced, Christopher Finch-Hatton, 15th Earl of Winchilsea in 1935. In 1946, he gave away Alice's youngest sister at her wedding to Alexander zu Eltz. Together, they were the parents of:

- Count László Hadik (1932–1973), who married Countess Vita Stachwitz in 1956. He died in a plane crash in 1973.
- Count János Béla Hadik (1933–2004), who married Edith Genevieve Gaillet in 1962. He later married Kirsten Scheuer.

In New Hampshire, his wife was instrumental the founding of, the now defunct, White Pines College. In 1965, she assisted with planning the fourth annual ball of the Grand Council of the Hungarian Boy Scouts Association.

After a long illness, Hadik died on February 16, 1971, in Camden, South Carolina. He was buried at Seregélyes in Hungary. His wife died three years later in Lisbon.

=== Legacy ===
In 2017, Szapáry and Széchényi family descendants donated several family artifacts to the Hungarian National Museum, including a wedding photo from 1931 of Count Béla Hadik, his bride, Alice Széchényi, and her father, Count László Széchényi.
