= Dionys Széchényi =

Austro-Hungarian diplomat (1866–1934)

Dionys Széchenyi

Austro-Hungarian Ambassador to Denmark
- In office 1908–1917
- Preceded by: Iván von Rubido-Zichy (as Charge d'Affaires)
- Succeeded by: Otto von Franz (as Charge d'Affaires)

Personal details
- Born: Dénes Széchenyi de Sárvár-felsővidék; 1 December 1866 Pest, Kingdom of Hungary, Austrian Empire
- Died: 26 January 1934 (aged 67) Stockholm, Sweden
- Spouse: Emilie de Caraman et Chimay (m. 1896; died 1934)
- Children: 4
- Parent(s): Imre Széchényi; Alexandra Sztáray

Count Dénes "Dionys" Széchenyi de Sárvár-felsővidék (1 December 1866 – 26 January 1934), was an Austro Hungarian soldier and diplomat.

== Early life ==
Széchenyi was born on 1 December 1866 in Pest, Kingdom of Hungary. Born into a prominent Hungarian noble family, he was the eldest son of Count Imre Széchenyi de Sárvár-felsővidék (1825–1898), the former Austrian Minister at the Court of Berlin and his wife, Countess Alexandra Sztáray de Sztára et Nagy-Mihály (1843–1914). The Széchényi family were one of the oldest and wealthiest in the Austro-Hungarian Empire. His younger brothers were Count Peter Széchenyi (who married Maria Ilona Esterházy de Galántha), Count István Széchenyi, and Count László Széchenyi (who married American heiress Gladys Vanderbilt).

His paternal grandparents were Count Ludwig "Lajos" Maria Aloys Széchenyi (eldest son of Count Ferenc Széchényi) and, his second wife, Austrian Countess Francisca (née von Wurmbrand-Stuppach) Széchenyi. His maternal grandparents were Count Ferdinánd Sztáray de Sztára et Nagy-Mihály, and Matilda Klobusiczky.

== Career ==
Széchényi and his three brothers were all Reserve Lieutenants in the Imperial and Royal Hussars as well as Chamberlains at the Court. His father owned thousands of acres divided into scores of farms and forest preserves on which the Széchenyis grew wheat, Turkish pepper, tobacco, hemp, and grapes. In 1898, upon the death of his father, he became the head of the Széchényi family.

Like his father, he became a diplomat. After serving in Paris, and as Secretary to the Legation in Dresden and Munich, he was appointed the Austro-Hungarian Ambassador to Denmark in 1908 succeeded Christoph von Wydenbruck, who left in 1907. The interim head of mission was Charge d'Affaires Iván von Rubido-Zichy. He served until 1917, until he was called back on account of his Entente sympathies. After he left Copenhagen, he returned to his estates in Hungary where the Hungarian Republic was established in 1918 by pacifist Count Mihály Károlyi following the end of World War I and the breakup of the Austro-Hungarian Empire. Széchényi, however, was forced to flee fourteen months later after the establishment of the Hungarian Soviet Republic, a Soviet socialist republic run by the Red Guards under the command of Mátyás Rákosi who nationalized all private property.

== Personal life ==
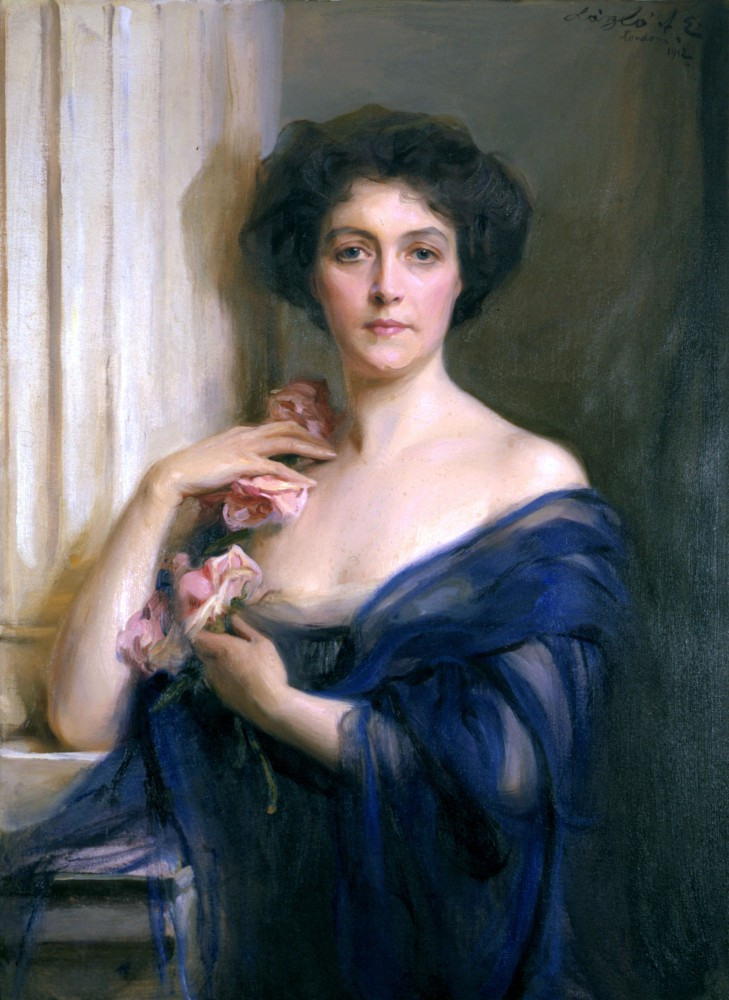
Portrait of his wife, Countess Dénes Széchényi, by Philip de László, 1912

In 1896, Széchényi married Countess Emilie de Caraman et Chimay (1871–1944), a daughter of Louise de Graffenried-Villars and Eugène Auguste de Riquet, Prince de Caraman-Chimay (son of Joseph de Riquet de Caraman, 17th Prince de Chimay and Émilie Pellapra). Her sister, Hélène, was married to John Francis Charles, 7th Count de Salis-Soglio. Together, they were the parents of:

- Count Janos Széchenyi (1897–1969), who married Countess Julianna Széchenyi, a daughter of Count Andor Pál Széchényi (eldest son of Count Gyula Széchényi).
- Countess Alexandra Széchenyi (1899–1977), who studied at a horticultural college in England and made improvements to the Sopronhorpács Park at the baroque Széchenyi Castle.
- Countess Louise-Denise Széchenyi (1901–1995), who married János Esterházy de Galántha, a son of Mária Sandor Esterházy de Galántha and Agnese Borghese-Aldobrandini.
- Count Ferdinand Széchenyi (1909–1996)

The prominent Anglo-Hungarian portrait painter, Philip de László, made two portraits of his wife, both in 1912.

Széchényi died in Stockholm, Sweden on 26 January 1934.
