= Hadik =

Hadik is a surname.

Notable people from the noble Hungarian Hadik de Futak family include:

- András Hadik (1710–1790), Austrian field marshal
- Endre Hadik (1862–1931), Hungarian politician
- János Hadik (1863–1933), Hungarian politician
- Karl Joseph Hadik (1756–1800), Austrian general
- Miksa Hadik (1868–1921), Austro-Hungarian diplomat
