= László Széchenyi =

Austro-Hungarian military officer (1879–1938)

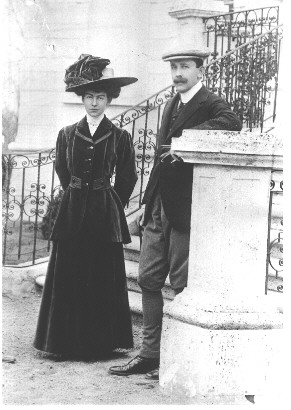
- Countess and Count László Széchenyi, c. 1908.

Hungarian Minister to the United Kingdom
- In office 1933–1935
- Monarch: Miklós Horthy
- Prime Minister: Ramsay MacDonald
- Preceded by: Baron Iván Rubido-Zichy
- Succeeded by: Szilárd Masirevich

1st Hungarian Minister to the United States
- In office 1922–1933
- Monarch: Miklós Horthy
- President: Warren G. Harding
- Preceded by: Inaugural holder
- Succeeded by: John Pelenyi

Personal details
- Born: Count László Jenő Mária Henrik Simon Széchenyi de Sárvár-felsővidék; 18 February 1879 Horpács, Austria-Hungary (now Hungary)
- Died: 5 July 1938 (aged 59) Budapest, Hungary
- Spouse: Gladys Vanderbilt (m. 1908)
- Relations: Dionys Széchényi (brother)
- Children: 5, including Alice Széchenyi
- Occupation: Military officer, diplomat, Imperial Chamberlain, venture capitalist

Count László Széchenyi de Sárvár-Felsővidék (18 February 1879 – 5 July 1938) was an Austro Hungarian military officer, Imperial Chamberlain, diplomat and venture capitalist. His great-uncle was Count István Széchenyi. László Széchenyi married Gladys Vanderbilt, the youngest daughter of Alice Claypoole Gwynne and Cornelius Vanderbilt II.

== Early life ==
The Count was born Széchenyi László Jenő Mária Henrik Simon on February 18, 1879 in Horpács, then a part of Austria-Hungary, a dual monarchy established in 1867. He was a son of Count Imre Széchenyi de Sárvár-felsővidék, the former Austrian Minister at the Court of Berlin and his wife, Countess Alexandra Sztaray-Szirmay et Nagy-Mihály (1843–1914). The Széchényi family were one of the oldest and wealthiest in the Austro-Hungarian Empire. He was also the great grandson of Ferenc Széchényi

He was the youngest of four brothers, including: Count Dionys, who was the Austro-Hungarian Ambassador in Denmark (he married Comtesse Marie de Caraman et Chimay), Peter Széchenyi, and István Széchenyi. All of the brothers were Reserve Lieutenants in the Imperial Hussars as well as Chamberlains at the Court.

His father owned thousands of acres divided into scores of farms and forest preserves on which the Széchenyis grew wheat, Turkish pepper, tobacco, hemp, and grapes.

== Career ==
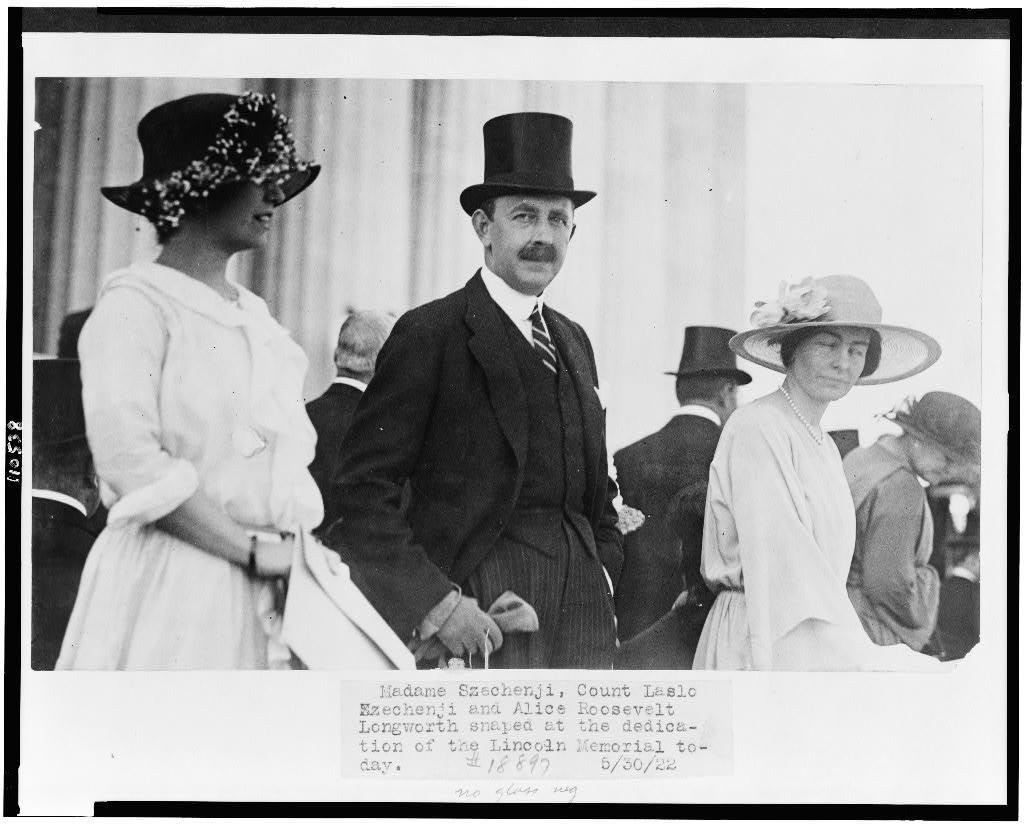
His wife, Count Széchenyi, and Alice Roosevelt Longworth at the dedication of the Lincoln Memorial, 1922.

Széchenyi was the inventor of the submarine wireless telegraphy, for sending and receiving sound-wave vibrations underwater. The machine was successfully tested with then U.S. Secretary of the Navy George von Lengerke Meyer, in Newport, Rhode Island. Széchenyi, along with David C. Watts, formed the Submarine Wireless Company to produce it.

By 1908, Széchenyi was the most prominent member of his family, which was quite numerous. He possessed two great estates in Hungary, Oermezo Castle (in Strážske, Slovakia), which is about three hundred years old and 4,000 acres, in the County of Zemplen, and Lagoshara Pusbla, a Summer place of about 4,300 acres, in the County of Somogy. Széchenyi also owned a one-story, ten room house at 14 Eotvoss-street in Budapest.

Shortly before the War, Széchenyi tried to become a financial leader in Hungary but failed. He is said to have lost $4,000,000 which is supposed to have come largely from his wife. He was a member of the 'Magnates Group' which speculated in mines, railroads and other enterprises. They failed to calculate the impact of the World War, and suffered a complete smash as a result of the fall in value of their shares.

=== Diplomatic career ===
The Kingdom of Hungary and the United States signed a treaty establishing friendly relations on August 29, 1921. On January 11, 1922, Széchenyi presented his credentials as Hungary's first Minister to the United States. He served in that role until March 31, 1933. He was transferred to the same post at the Court of Saint James's in England in 1933.

== Personal life ==
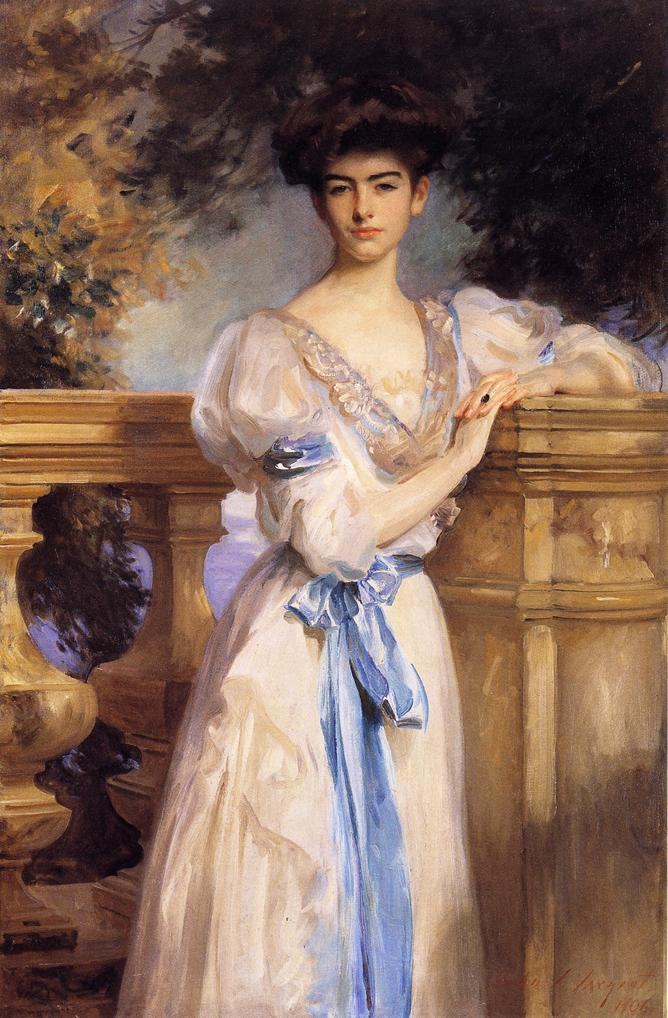
Portrait of his wife, Gladys Vanderbilt, two years before their marriage, by John Singer Sargent, 1906.

Széchenyi was twenty-eight years old when he met Gladys Vanderbilt (1886–1965), the seventh and youngest child of Alice Claypoole Gwynne and Cornelius Vanderbilt II, the president and chairman of the New York Central Railroad. Gladys grew up in the family home on Fifth Avenue in New York City, and their summer "cottage," The Breakers in Newport, Rhode Island. They married on January 27, 1908, at her family home in New York City, after their meeting in Berlin near her twenty-first birthday in 1907. Their early married life was spent in Hungary raising their five children. Together, Széchenyi and Vanderbilt were the parents of five daughters:

- Countess Cornelia "Gilia" Széchényi (1908–1958), who married Eugene Bowie Roberts (1898–1983), an heir of the Roberts family of Bowie, Maryland, a Colonial family of Maryland.
- Countess Alice "Ai" Széchényi (1911–1974), who married Hungarian Count Béla Hadik (1905–1971), a son of Count János Hadik, who was briefly the Prime Minister of the Kingdom of Hungary.
- Countess Gladys Széchényi (1913–1978), who married the English Christopher Finch-Hatton, 15th Earl of Winchilsea (1911–1950). They divorced in 1945, and in 1954, she married American banker Arthur Talbot Peterson (1905–1962).
- Countess Sylvia Anita Gabriel Denise Irene Marie "Syvie" Széchényi (1918–1998), who married Hungarian Count Antal Szapáry von Muraszombath Széchysziget und Szapar (1905–1972).
- Countess Ferdinandine "Bubby" Széchényi (1923–2016), who married the Austrian Count Alexander von und zu Eltz genannt Faust von Stromberg (1911–1977).

CoSzéchenyi died in Budapest on 5 July 1938. His widow died on 29 January 1965 in Washington, D.C.

=== Descendants ===
Through his daughter Gladys, he was a grandfather of Christopher Denys Stormont Finch-Hatton, 16th Earl of Winchilsea (1936–1999), who is known for his work promoting of the interests of the displaced Sahrawi people.
