= Imre Széchényi =

Hungarian nobleman, politician (1825–1898)

Count Imre Széchényi
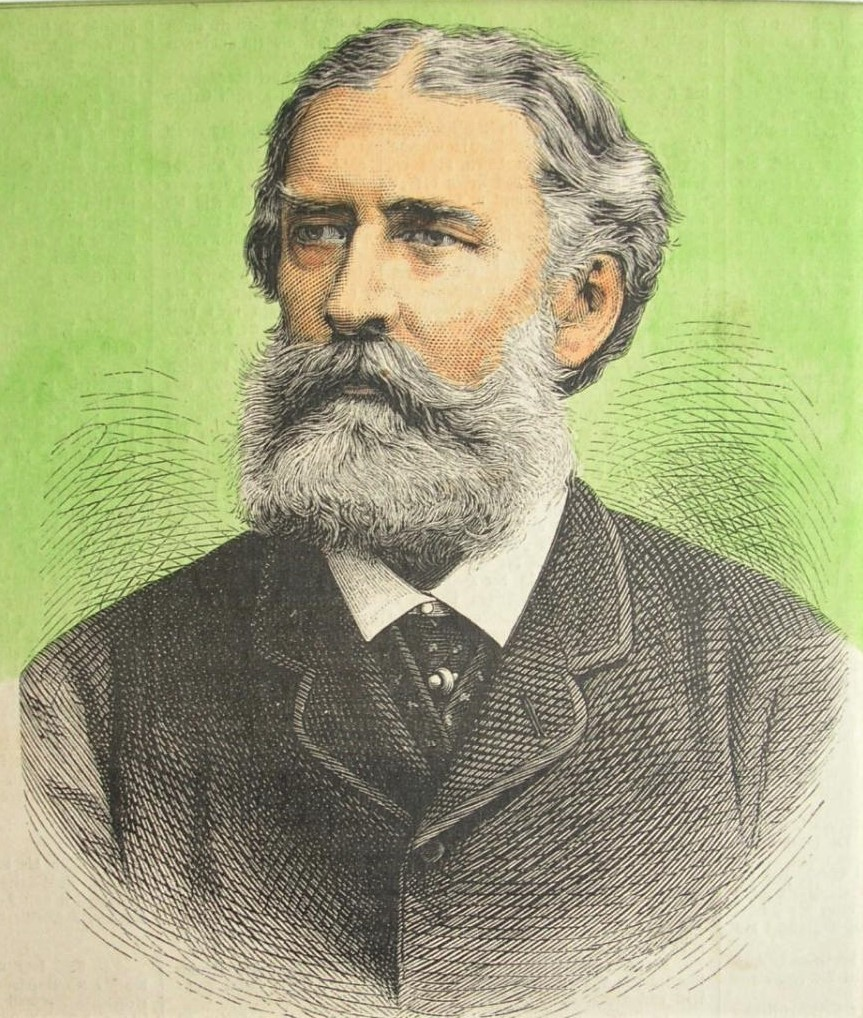
- Count Széchényi in 1878

Austro-Hungarian Ambassador to the German Empire
- In office 27 December 1878 – 10 October 1892
- Chancellor: Otto von Bismarck
- Preceded by: Alajos Károlyi
- Succeeded by: Ladislaus von Szögyény-Marich

Austro-Hungarian Ambassador to the Kingdom of the Two Sicilies
- In office 31 March 1860 – 19 July 1864
- Preceded by: Anton Stephan von Martini
- Succeeded by: Dissolution of the embassy

Personal details
- Born: Emmerich Széchényi von Sárvár und Felsővidék; 15 February 1825 Vienna, Austrian Empire
- Died: 11 March 1898 (aged 73) Budapest, Austria-Hungary
- Spouse: Countess Maria Alexandra von Sztáray-Szirmay (m. 1865; died 1898)
- Relations: Ferenc Széchényi (grandfather); István Széchenyi (uncle); Alice Széchenyi (granddaughter)
- Children: 4, including László
- Parent(s): Count Lajos Széchényi; Countess Francisca von Wurmbrand-Stuppach

Count Emmerich "Imre" Széchényi of Sárvár-Felsővidék (15 February 1825 – 11 March 1898), was a Hungarian nobleman and landowner, and Austro-Hungarian diplomat and politician. He was Austrian ambassador in Berlin during the government of Bismarck. He signed for the Austrian emperor Bismarck's Alliance of the Three Emperors 1873, and represented Austria at the Berlin Conference on the Congo 1884.

== Early life ==
Széchényi was born on 15 February 1825 in Vienna into a prominent Hungarian noble family. He was the son of Count Ludwig "Lajos" Maria Aloys Széchenyi (1781–1855) and, his second wife, Austrian Countess Francisca (née von Wurmbrand-Stuppach) Széchenyi (1797–1873). The Széchényi family were one of the oldest and wealthiest in the Austro-Hungarian Empire.

His maternal grandparents were Count Heinrich von Wurmbrand-Stuppach and Baroness Josefa von Ledebur-Wicheln. His father was the eldest son of Countess Julia Festetics de Tolna and Count Ferenc Széchényi, founder of the Hungarian National Library (today named the National Széchényi Library) and the National Museum in Budapest.

His paternal uncle was Count István Széchenyi, the Hungarian Minister of Public Works and Transport who is widely considered to be one of the greatest statesmen in Hungarian history.

Széchényi received a private education and studied from 1838 to 1843 at the Imperial and Royal Law Academy in Pressburg (now Bratislava).

== Career ==
With the help of his father's connections, he entered the diplomatic service of the Austrian Empire in 1844, serving until 1848 as an Imperial Attaché at the Austrian Embassy to the Holy See in Rome from 1848 to 1860. He was then Legation Secretary, with the rank of Chargé d'Affaires, at the Swedish Court in Stockholm from 1848 to 1850. From 1850 to 1852, he served at the German Bundestag in Frankfurt am Main, then at the Belgian Court in Brussels from 1852 to 1854. He served as the Russian Court in St. Petersburg from 1854 to 1860. While in Stockholm and St. Petersburg, Széchényi also temporarily served as head of mission and while in Frankfurt and St. Petersburg, he often met with Otto von Bismarck.

Under Foreign Minister Bernhard von Rechberg, Széchényi was appointed Imperial Ambassador and Minister Plenipotentiary at the Royal Sicilian Court in Naples in March 1860. The Kingdom of the Two Sicilies was already in the process of dissolution at that time. Széchényi followed King Francis II first to the fortress of Gaeta, then into exile in Rome; in 1864 he was recalled and placed into temporary retirement.

As a member of the Old Conservative Party, he became a member of the Hungarian Reichstag in 1865, and from 1869 a member of the House of Magnates (the upper chamber of the Diet of Hungary). Under Foreign Minister Gyula Andrássy, he was again called to the diplomatic service of the dual monarchy, which had been reconstituted by the Compromise in 1867, and in 1878 was appointed Imperial and Royal Ambassador to the German Empire. He held this post until 10 October 1892, when he retired to his estates in Horpács, Hungary.

=== Composer ===
In his private life, Széchényi was also a cultivated amateur composer of Lieder and dance music, a friend of Franz Liszt, Johann Strauss II, Émile Waldteufel etc. A collection of Széchényi's songs by Katharina Ruckgaber (soprano), Jochen Kupfer (baritone), Peter Thalheimer (csakan), and Helmut Deutsch (piano) was released on Audimax in 2017. A collection of his polkas and mazurkas for orchestra, played by the Budapest Symphony Orchestra conducted by Valéria Csányi, was released on Naxos in 2017.

== Personal life ==
In 1865, he married Countess Maria Alexandra von Sztáray-Szirmay (1843–1914), a daughter of Count Ferdinánd Sztáray de Sztára et Nagymihály and Matilda Klobusiczky. Together, they were the parents of four sons:

- Count Dionys Széchenyi (1866–1934), the Austro-Hungarian Minister to France and Denmark; he married Countess Emilie de Caraman et Chimay, a daughter of Eugène Auguste de Riquet, Prince de Caraman-Chimay (son of Joseph de Riquet de Caraman, 17th Prince de Chimay). Her sister, Hélène, was married to John Francis Charles, 7th Count de Salis-Soglio.
- Count Peter Széchenyi (1870–1924), who married Maria Ilona Esterházy de Galántha, a daughter of Moric Esterházy de Galántha and Pauline von Stockau, in 1904. Her sister, Mária Franziska, married Count Paul Pálffy ab Erdöd and Prince Béla Odescalchi.
- Count István Széchenyi (1873–1963)
- Count László Széchenyi (1879–1938), the Hungarian Minister to the United States and United Kingdom who married American heiress Gladys Vanderbilt, the youngest child of Alice Claypoole Gwynne and Cornelius Vanderbilt II, president of the New York Central Railroad, in 1908.

Count Széchényi died in Budapest on 11 March 1898.

== Honors ==
- 1852: Chamberlain
- 1867: Privy Council
- 1882: Grand Cross of the Austrian Order of Leopold
- 1889: Order of the Black Eagle
- 1889: Grand Cross of the Imperial and Royal Order of Saint Stephen
- 1892: Knight of the Order of the Golden Fleece

Diplomatic posts
Preceded by Anton Stephan von Martini	Austro-Hungarian Ambassador to the Kingdom of the Two Sicilies; 1860–1864	Succeeded by None (dissolution of the embassy)
Preceded by Alajos Károlyi	Austro-Hungarian Ambassador to the German Empire; 1878–1892	Succeeded by Ladislaus von Szögyény-Marich
