= Alice Széchenyi =

Hungarian heiress (1911–1974)

- Born: 27 July 1911; Remetevasgyár, Austria-Hungary
- Died: 25 February 1974 (aged 62); Lisbon, Portugal
- Other name: Ai
- Occupations: Heiress; socialite; horticulturalist; educational founder
- Organization: White Pines College
- Spouse: Count Béla Hadik (m. 1931; died 1971)
- Children: 2
- Parents: Count László Széchenyi; Gladys Vanderbilt
- Relatives: Count Imre Széchényi (paternal grandfather); Cornelius Vanderbilt II (maternal grandfather); Alice Claypoole Vanderbilt (maternal grandmother)
- Family: Széchenyi; Vanderbilt

Countess Alice Széchenyi (27 July 1911 – 25 February 1974), nicknamed "Ai," was a Hungarian-American heiress. She was descended from Hungarian counts and the American Vanderbilt family.

== Early life and education ==
Széchenyi was born in 1911 at Remetevasgyár, Hungary (today Remetské Hámre, Slovakia, on the Slovak-Hungarian border). She was the daughter and second child of Count László Széchenyi, the former Hungarian Minister to the U.S., and his American born-wife, Countess Gladys Vanderbilt Széchenyi. She had four sisters, including Gladys, Sylvia and Nandine. She was photographed with her sisters as a socialite for publications such as Vogue and Harper's Bazaar.

Her paternal grandparents were Count Imre Széchenyi de Sárvár-felsővidék, the former Austrian Minister at the Court of Berlin and his wife, Countess Alexandra Sztaray-Szirmay et Nagy-Mihály. Her maternal grandparents were Cornelius Vanderbilt II and Alice Claypoole Vanderbilt.

Széchenyi was educated at St. Wills Convent in Ascot, Berkshire, England.

== Personal life ==
Széchenyi married Count Béla Hadik on April 18, 1931. The wedding took place at St. Matthew's Church in Washington, D.C. and was officiated by the Most Rev. Pietro Fumasoni Biondi, the Apostolic Delegate to the United States (who later became a Cardinal in 1933), followed by a reception at the Hungarian Legation. As a wedding gift to Alice, his mother sent a "diamond necklace with earrings to match, which had been the gift of the Empress, Queen Maria Theresa, to an ancestor of the bride and bridegroom."

They had two children:

- Count László Hadik (1932–1973), who married Countess Vita Stachwitz in 1956. He died in a plane crash during the summer of 1973.
- Count János Béla Hadik (1933–2004), who married Edith Genevieve Gaillet in 1962.

== Later life and death ==
Széchenyi and her family lived in Hungary until 1946, then moved to the United States and lived in Chester, New Hampshire, where they bought a house from a Vanderbilt cousin. She was instrumental the founding of the now defunct White Pines College in New Hampshire. She also loaned family artwork to the Preservation Society of Newport County.

Széchenyi's husband died in 1971. Széchenyi died in 1974, after suffering a stroke, in Lisbon, Portugal. She was buried in the Hadik family tomb at Seregélyes Castle, Fejér, Hungary.
