= Remetské Hámre =

Remetské Hámre Remetevasgyár
- Municipality
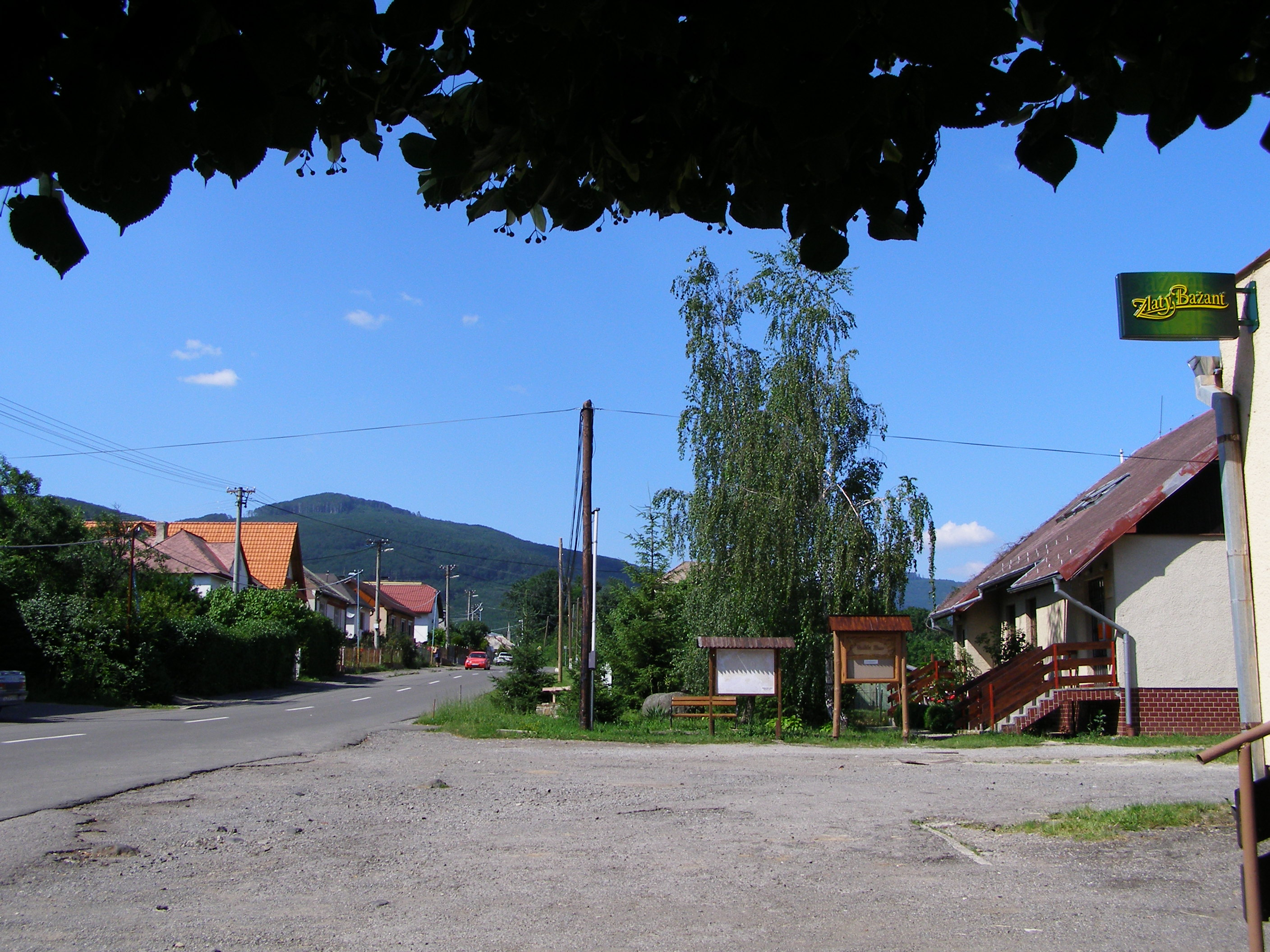

- Flag

- Location of Remetské Hámre in the Košice Region Location of Remetské Hámre in Slovakia
- Coordinates: 48.85°N 22.18°E
- Country: Slovakia
- Region: Košice Region
- District: Sobrance District
- First mentioned: 1828

Area
  - Total: 24.61 km^{2} (9.50 sq mi)
- Elevation: 288 m (945 ft)

Population (2025)
  - Total: 537
- Time zone: UTC+1 (CET)
  - Summer (DST): UTC+2 (CEST)
- Postal code: 724 1
- Area code: +421 56
- Vehicle registration plate (until 2022): SO
- Website: www.remetskehamre.sk

Remetské Hámre (Hungarian: Remetevasgyár) is a village and municipality in the Sobrance District in the Košice Region of east Slovakia.

== History ==
In historical records, the village was first mentioned in 1828 making it the newest village in the Sobrance district.

== Geography ==
The municipality lies at an altitude of 288 metres (945 ft) and covers an area of 24.61 km^{2} (9.50 sq mi) (2025).

== Population ==
Population statistic (10 years)
Year	1995	2005	2015	2025
Count	699	656	585	537
Difference		−6.15%	−10.82%	−8.20%

Population statistic
Year	2024	2025
Count	542	537
Difference		−0.92%

It has a population of 537 people (31 December 2025).

=== Ethnicity ===
Census 2021 (1+ %)
Ethnicity	Number	Fraction
Slovak	506	91.83%
Not found out	42	7.62%
Total	551	

In year 2021 was 551 people by ethnicity 506 as Slovak, 42 as Not found out, 3 as Czech, 3 as Rusyn, 2 as English, 1 as Polish and 1 as Hungarian.

Note on population: The difference values of population numbers in the table "Population statistic" and in the sections "Ethnicity" & "Religion" is caused by the use of various statistical methods.

=== Religion ===
Census 2021 (1+ %)
Religion	Number	Fraction
Roman Catholic Church	364	66.06%
Greek Catholic Church	87	15.79%
None	45	8.17%
Not found out	40	7.26%
Eastern Orthodox Church	9	1.63%
Total	551	

In year 2021 was 551 people by religion 364 from Roman Catholic Church, 87 from Greek Catholic Church, 45 from None, 40 from Not found out, 9 from Eastern Orthodox Church, 3 from Evangelical Church, 2 from Other and 1 from Jewish community.

== Facilities ==
The village has a public library, a swimming pool and a football pitch.

== Notable people ==
- Alice Széchenyi (1911–1974), Hungarian-American heiress
