= Széchenyi family =

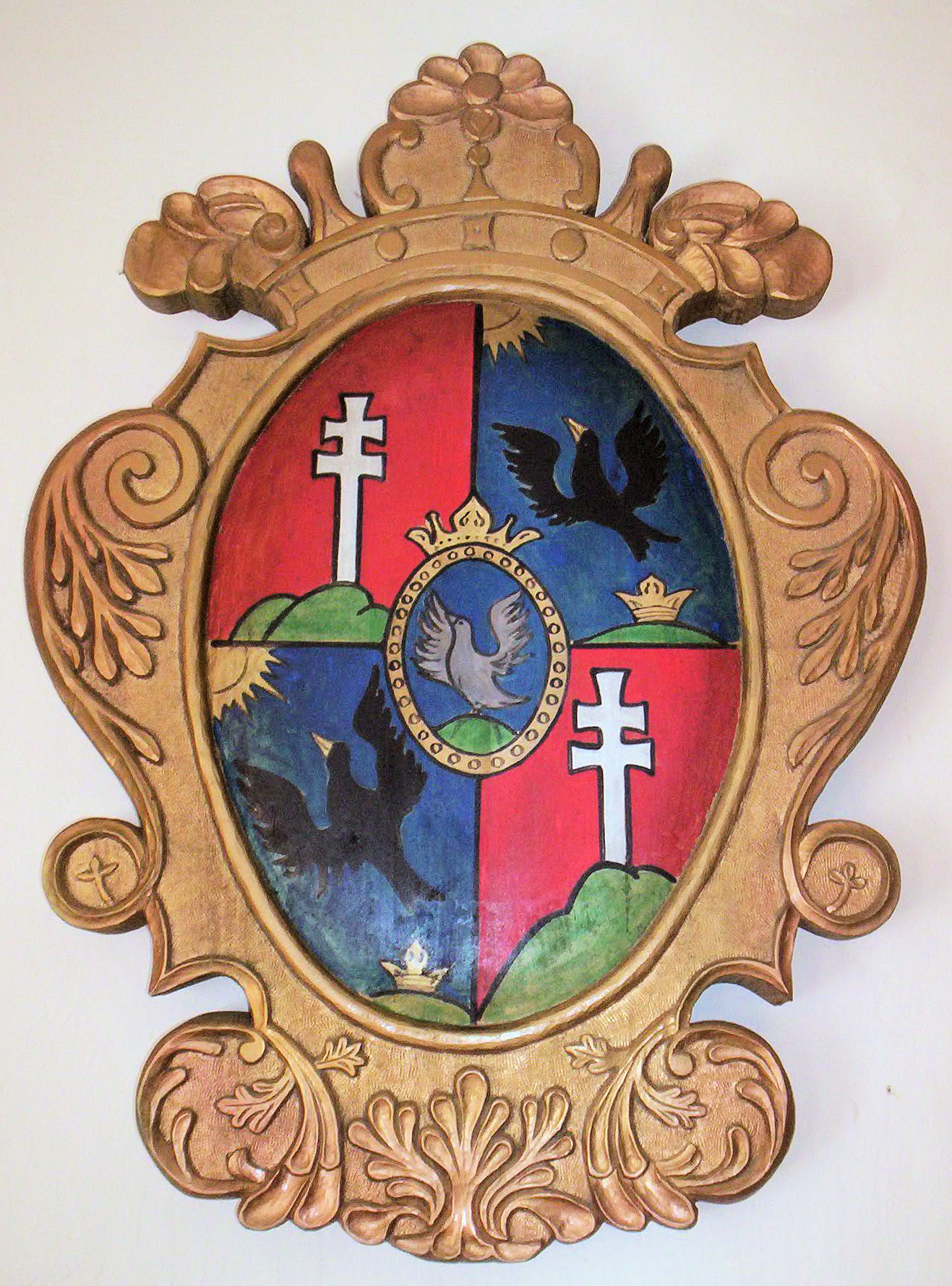
Coat of arms of Counts Széchényi

The House of Széchenyi or Széchényi (Hungarian pronunciation: [ˈseːt͡ʃeːɲi]) is the name of a wealthy Hungarian noble family which produced many politicians, landowners, and influential figures within Austro-Hungarian Empire.

== History ==
The family first appeared in the documents at the beginning of the 16th century and derived its name from the town of Szécsény. First prominent member and founder of family wealth was György Széchenyi (1603–1695), who served as Archbishop of Esztergom. The family received the title of Imperial Count in 1697 by Emperor Leopold I. In 1777 Count Ferenc Széchényi purchased the lands of Sárvár and Felvidék and from then on the family members bore the name Count Széchényi de Sárvár-Felsővidék. The elder, non-comital, branch of the family bore the name Széchényi-Szabó but became extinct in the first half of the 20th century.

== Notable members ==
- Ferenc Széchényi (1754–1820), founder of the Hungarian National Library and National Museum in Budapest
- István Széchenyi (1791–1860), Hungarian politician, political theorist, and writer
- Imre Széchényi (1825–1898), Hungarian diplomat
- Béla Széchenyi (1837–1918), Hungarian explorer
- Pál Széchenyi (1838–1901), the Minister of Agriculture, Industry and Trade of Hungary
- Ödön Széchenyi (1839–1922), an Imperial Ottoman pasha
- Andor Széchenyi (1865–1907), Hungarian nobleman and explorer
- Dionys Széchényi (1866–1934), Austro-Hungarian diplomat
- László Széchenyi (1879–1938), Austro-Hungarian military officer, Imperial Chamberlain, diplomat and venture capitalist
- Gladys Vanderbilt Széchenyi (1886–1965), American heiress from the prominent American Vanderbilt family, and the wife of a Hungarian count, László Széchenyi
- Zsigmond Széchenyi (1898–1967), Hungarian hunter and writer
- Alice Széchenyi (1911–1974), daughter of László Széchenyi and Gladys Vanderbilt Széchenyi
- Beatrix Széchenyi de Sárvár-Felsővidék (1930–2021), Hungarian-German socialite and consort of the Schönburg family
