= Sámuel Jósika =

Hungarian politician

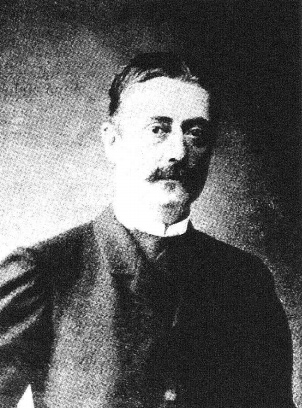

Minister besides the King of Hungary
- In office 18 January 1895 – 20 January 1898
- Preceded by: Géza Fejérváry
- Succeeded by: Dezső Bánffy

Speaker of the House of Magnates
- In office 21 September 1912 – 19 June 1917
- Preceded by: Albin Csáky
- Succeeded by: Endre Hadik-Barkóczy

Personal details
- Born: 23 August 1848 Salzburg, Austrian Empire
- Died: 4 June 1923 (aged 74) Cluj, Kingdom of Romania
- Party: Liberal Party
- Profession: politician

Baron Sámuel (Samu) Jósika de Branyicska (23 August 1848 – 4 June 1923) was a Hungarian politician, who served as Minister besides the King between 1895 and 1898. After the Treaty of Trianon he was the leader of the Hungarian minority's main party (Országos Magyar Párt) in Transylvania after it became part of the Kingdom of Romania.

Political offices
Preceded by Géza Fejérváry	Minister besides the King; 1895–1898	Succeeded by Dezső Bánffy
Preceded by Albin Csáky	Speaker of the House of Magnates; 1912–1917	Succeeded by Endre Hadik-Barkóczy
