= János Hadik =

Hungarian Prime Minister and landowner (1863–1933)

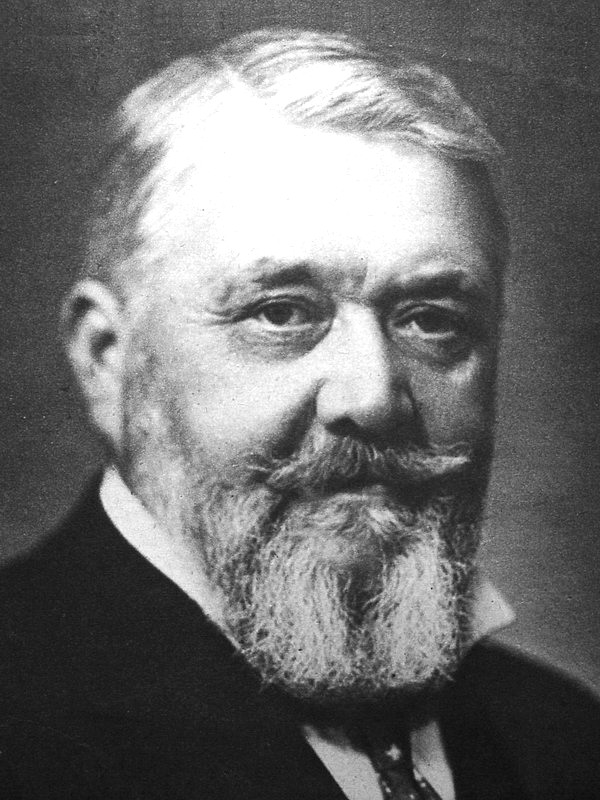
- Hadik in 1931

Prime Minister of the Kingdom of Hungary
- In office 30 October 1918 – 31 October 1918
- Monarch: Charles IV
- Preceded by: Sándor Wekerle
- Succeeded by: Mihály Károlyi

Personal details
- Born: 23 November 1863 Pálócz, Kingdom of Hungary, Austrian Empire (now Pavlovce nad Uhom, Slovakia)
- Died: 10 December 1933 (aged 70) Budapest, Hungary
- Party: Liberal (from 1901)
- Spouse: Alexandra Zichy de Zics et Vásonkeői (m. 1893)
- Children: 4, including Antal Béla Mary Paul

Military service
- Allegiance: Austria-Hungary
- Branch/service: Austro-Hungarian Army
- Years of service: 1884–1893
- Rank: First lieutenant
- Unit: 10th Hussars

Count János Hadik de Futak (23 November 1863 – 10 December 1933) was a Hungarian landowner and politician who served for 17 hours as Prime Minister of Hungary, beginning on 30 October 1918. His tenure coincided with a period of political instability in Hungary immediately after World War I, during which several successive governments ruled the country. He was forced to resign at the outbreak of the Aster Revolution on 31 October 1918, serving the shortest tenure of any Hungarian Prime Minister.

== Early life ==
János Hadik was born on 23 November 1863 in Pálócz, Ung County to Count Béla Hadik Mátyás Antal (1822–1885) and Countess Barkóczy Ilona (1833–1887) as their second child, the first being Endre Hadik-Barkóczy and the third Miksa Hadik. He was a great-grandson of András Hadik de Futak.

== Military career ==
After completion of his secondary school studies in Kassa, he graduated from the Theresian Military Academy in Wiener Neustadt, and then in 1884 he entered the joint Austro-Hungarian Army as a Hussar cavalry lieutenant in the 10th Hussars in Bácska. However, in 1893, while first lieutenant in rank, he placed himself off duty.

== Political career ==
In 1894, Hadik was elected to the upper chamber of the Diet of Hungary, the House of Magnates, and he acted in the direction of separating the church and the state affairs from each other.

Hadik, who joined the Liberal Party in 1901, took his place in Diet as the representative of this party. In the second government of Sándor Wekerle during 1906 to 1910, founded by the coalition government as a state representative, Hadik was Secretary of State in the Interior Ministry and was a senior advisor to the Minister of the Interior, Count Gyula Andrássy. Hadik was the closest working companion to Gyula Andrássy.

Hadik played an important part in drawing up a bill proposing universal male suffrage that, however, was defeated. Having withdrawn from politics for a while after the end of this post, Hadik was appointed Minister of State in August 1917, in a process that continued during the World War I. He served as minister without portfolio, with responsibility for food production and distribution, in the third Wekerle government.

=== Prime Minister of the Kingdom of Hungary ===
After the resignation of the Sándor Wekerle Cabinet on 23 October 1918, which had opposed reforms proposed by Austrian politicians to try to save the Austro-Hungarian Empire, Archduke Joseph, representing Emperor Karl in Hungary, appointed Hadik as prime minister instead of Mihály Károlyi, contrary to expectations, under the influence of Andrássy. After the announcement of the new Prime Minister, Hadik, who had to leave Prime Minister's office due to the conflicts in Budapest and the influence of the Aster Revolution since October 28, fled abroad. Following these events, the Austrian Archduke Joseph August, with the powers of the king, announced that he had appointed Károlyi as prime minister on October 31, 1918.

Hadik returned to Hungary later, working in the fields of economy and politics.

== Personal life ==
On 2 October 1893 in Seregélyes he married Alexandra Zichy de Zics et Vásonkeői (1873–1949), from whom four children were born:

- Amalia Andrea Johanna Alexandra (1894–1967), who married Prince Louis von Hohenlohe-Langenburg.
- Margaret Johanna Maria Gabriella Rafaella Eva Alexandra (1899–1978), who married Wengersky Viktor von Count, Baron of Ungerschütz
- Anthony Mary Martin Max (1902–1935), who married Edit Gschwindt de Győr
- Antal Béla Mary Paul (1905–1971), who married Sárvár-Felsővidéki Countess Széchenyi Alice, daughter of Countess Gladys Vanderbilt Széchenyi and Count László Széchenyi.

== Death ==
On 10 December 1933, Hadik died in Budapest.

There are living descendants of the youngest son of Hadik, Antal Béla Mary Paul. Most of them live in the United States.

== See also ==
- Revolutions and interventions in Hungary (1918–20)

Political offices
Preceded by Sándor Wekerle	Prime Minister of Hungary; 1918	Succeeded by Mihály Károlyi
Party political offices
Preceded by Kálmán Széll	Chairman of the Constitution Party; 1913–1918	Succeeded by party abolished
