= Cornelius Vanderbilt II House =

Demolished mansion in Manhattan, New York

Coordinates: 40°45′47.92″N 73°58′26.75″W

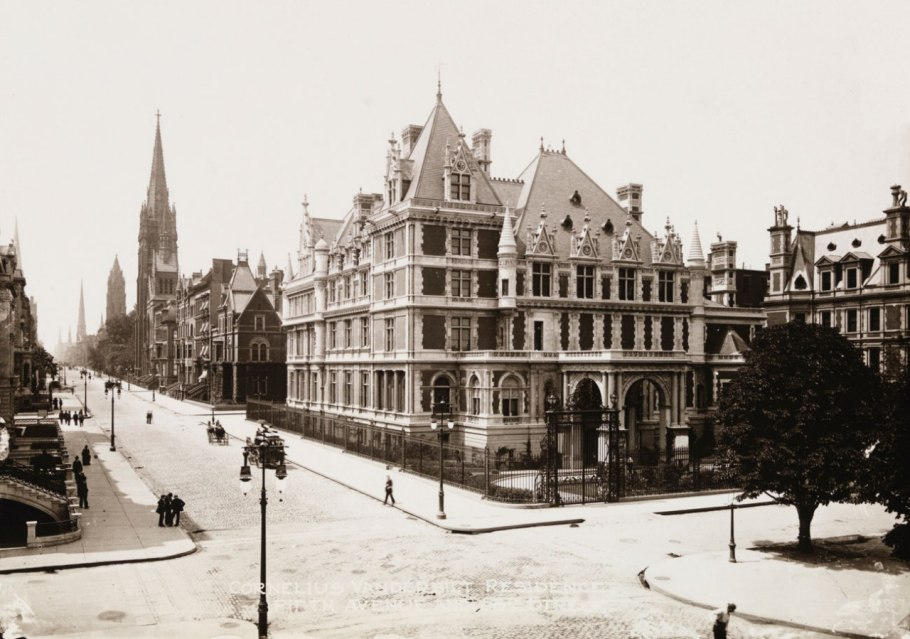
- Looking south down Fifth Avenue in 1908, with the mansion's front entrance on West 58th Street

General information
- Location: 1 West 57th Street, Manhattan, New York City, United States
- Opened: 1883
- Demolished: 1926

Design and construction
- Main contractor: David H. King, Jr.

The Cornelius Vanderbilt II House was a large mansion built in 1883 at 1 West 57th Street in Manhattan, New York City. It occupied the frontage along the west side of Fifth Avenue from 57th to 58th Street at Grand Army Plaza. The home was sold in 1926 and demolished to make way for the Bergdorf Goodman Building.

== Design and history ==
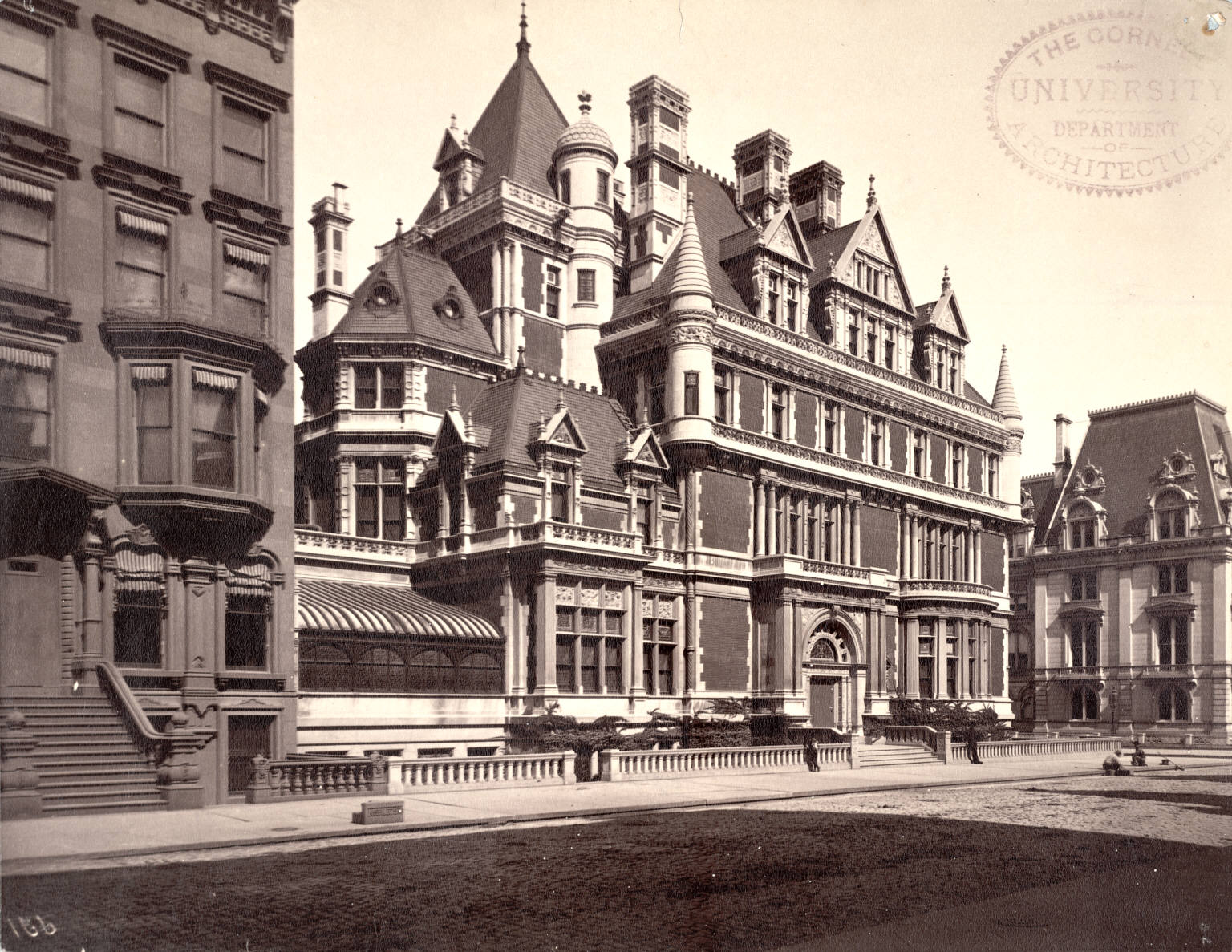
Rear facade of the mansion on West 57th Street

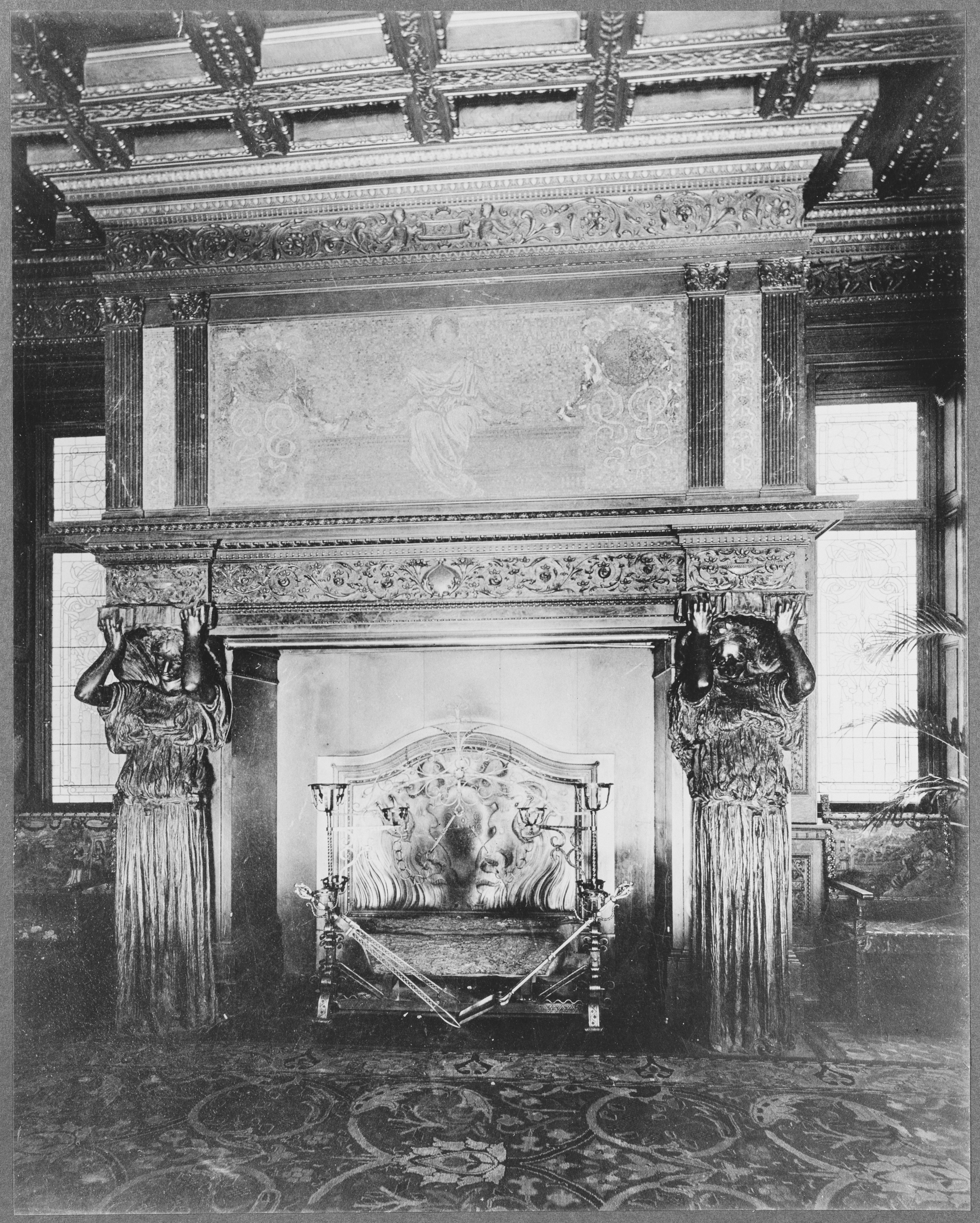
A mantelpiece designed by Augustus Saint-Gaudens

The Châteauesque mansion, occupying the northwest corner of Fifth Avenue and West 57th Street, was constructed in 1883 for Cornelius Vanderbilt II, the eldest grandson of Commodore Cornelius Vanderbilt, founder of the family fortune. The ground level contained a drawing room, a dining room (which doubled as the art gallery), and a reception room. The second floor housed a salon, a music room, and a conservatory; the family bedrooms were on the remaining floors.

Cornelius, feeling that others were trying to outdo his house, bought all of the property on the Fifth Avenue block. He then hired George B. Post and Richard Morris Hunt to construct a much larger mansion, filling the entire block front. The interiors were done by the French design firm of Jules Allard and Sons, with many pieces in the house being imported from Europe.

The house was six stories tall, not including the basement, and also had a stable and a private garden next door. The first floor featured a five-story Caen stone entrance hall leading to the library, a small salon, a grand salon, a watercolor room, a two-story ballroom, and a two-story dining room that doubled as an art gallery. Also on the first floor were a two-story Moorish-inspired smoking room, a den, an office, a breakfast room, and a pantry. On the second floor were Mrs. Vanderbilt's bedroom, boudoir, bath, closet, and dressing room. Mr. Vanderbilt's bedroom was also on the second floor, as well as his bathroom, dressing room, closet, and private study.

The mansion was, and remains, the largest private residence ever built in New York City. Thirteen years after moving into his new home (he also lived at The Breakers, a 125,000 square feet (11,600 m^{2}) summer "cottage" in Newport, Rhode Island), Cornelius suffered a stroke after which he used a wheelchair for the remaining three years of his life. In his will, he left his wife Alice Claypoole Vanderbilt a $7,000,000 trust fund and the use of 1 West 57th Street and The Breakers.

After Cornelius died, Alice never remarried and continued to live in the mansion and in Newport. However, the house was never opened again to friends, and the only functions that are known to have happened there were the funerals of her two sons. Subsequently, it was just Alice and the 37 servants needed to run the mansion. As with the rest of the residences on Fifth Avenue, the mansion at 1 West 57th Street began to be encroached on by commercial skyscrapers, but Alice remained.

=== Sale and demolition ===
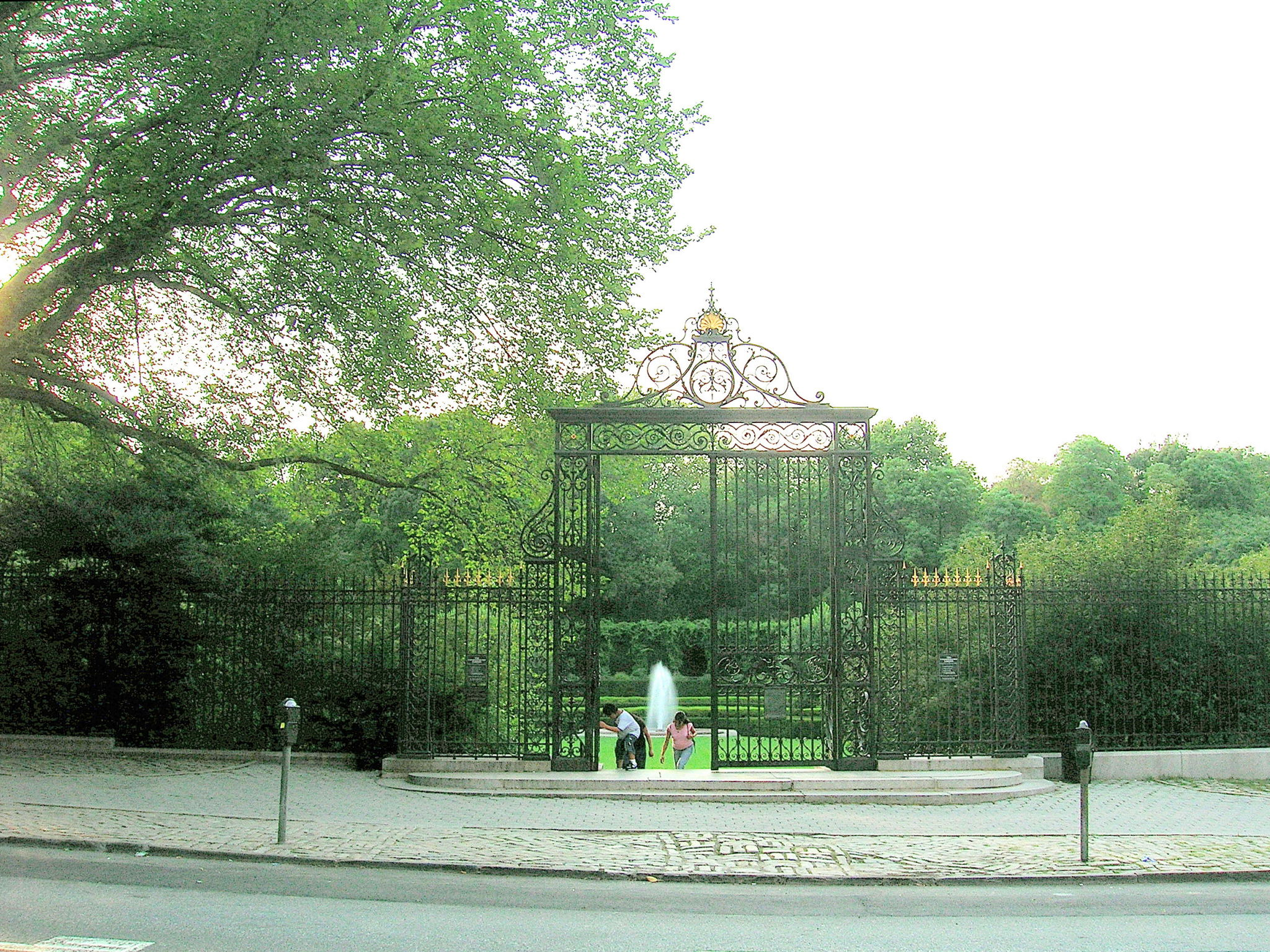
Former front gate of the mansion, now at the 105 Street entrance to Central Park

The trust fund that Cornelius had left his wife produced a yearly income of $250,000, which was just enough to maintain both houses. Alice held on as long as she could, but she was forced to sell it in 1926. She had no hope for the house's preservation because she knew that developers, Braisted Realty Corporation (led by real estate developer Frederick Brown), had paid a hefty $7,000,000 for the land, and not for the house that stood on it.

A week before the wrecking ball was scheduled to demolish the 43-year-old home, Mrs. Vanderbilt arranged to have it opened to the public for fifty cents admission, which would be donated to charity. Before selling it, she donated as many elements from the interiors as she could, including the baronial Augustus Saint-Gaudens-designed fireplace and the Moorish ceiling piece from the smoking room. She also donated the 10-foot-tall metal front entryway gates.

Once the mansion was demolished, it was replaced by the Bergdorf Goodman Building. After selling the home for $7,000,000, she bought the George J. Gould House for $800,000.

== See also ==
- List of Gilded Age mansions
- Vanderbilt houses
