= List of ambassadors of Austria to Denmark =

Ambassadors of Austria to Denmark

Ambassador of the Republic of Austria to the Kingdom of Denmark
- Coat of arms of Austria
- Incumbent; Alice Irvin since 2021
- Ministry of Foreign Affairs; Embassy of Austria, Copenhagen
- Style: Her Excellency
- Website: Austrian Embassy, Copenhagen

The Ambassador of the Republic of Austria to the Kingdom of Denmark is the Republic of Austria's foremost diplomatic representative in the Kingdom of Denmark. As head of Austria's diplomatic mission there, the ambassador is the official representative of the president and government of Austria to the Prime Minister and the government of Denmark. The position has the rank and status of an Ambassador Extraordinary and Minister Plenipotentiary and the embassy is located in the district of Østerbro in Copenhagen.

== Heads of Mission ==
=== Habsburg Ambassadors (until 1804) ===
1691: Establishment of diplomatic relations

...

- 1713–1720: Ignaz Schmid
- 1720–1734: Johann von Harding (Charge d'Affaires)
- 1734–1737: Johann Joseph von Khevenhüller-Metsch
- 1737–1750: Johann von Harding (Charge d'Affaires)
- 1750–1756: Franz Xaver Wolfgang von Orsini-Rosenberg
- 1756–1756: Philipp von Lauterburg (Charge d'Affaires)
- 1756–1763: Carl Johann von Dietrichstein-Proskau-Leslie
- 1763–1764: Anton Binder von Krieglstein (Charge d'Affaires)
- 1764–1765: Franz Joseph von Wurmbrand-Stuppach
- 1765–1766: Alois von Locella (1733–1800) (Charge d'Affaires)
- 1766–1769: Philipp Welsperg von Primör und Raitenau
- 1770–1774: Johann von Mercier (Charge d'Affaires)
- 1774–1775: Franz Leopold von Metzburg (Charge d'Affaires)
- 1775–1777: Johann Ludwig von Cobenzl
- 1777–1779: Ludwig d’Yves
- 1779–1782: Johann Friedrich von Kageneck
- 1782–1785: Leonhard von Collenbach
- 1785–1786: Josef von Preindl (Charge d'Affaires)
- 1786–1787: Heinrich von Schlick
- 1787–1789: Maximilian von Mertz (Charge d'Affaires)
- 1789–1795: Josef Ludwig Nepomuk von Breuner-Enkevoirth
- 1795–1801: Carl Wilhelm von Ludolf
- 1801–1804: Aloys von Kaunitz-Rietberg

=== Austrian Ambassadors ===
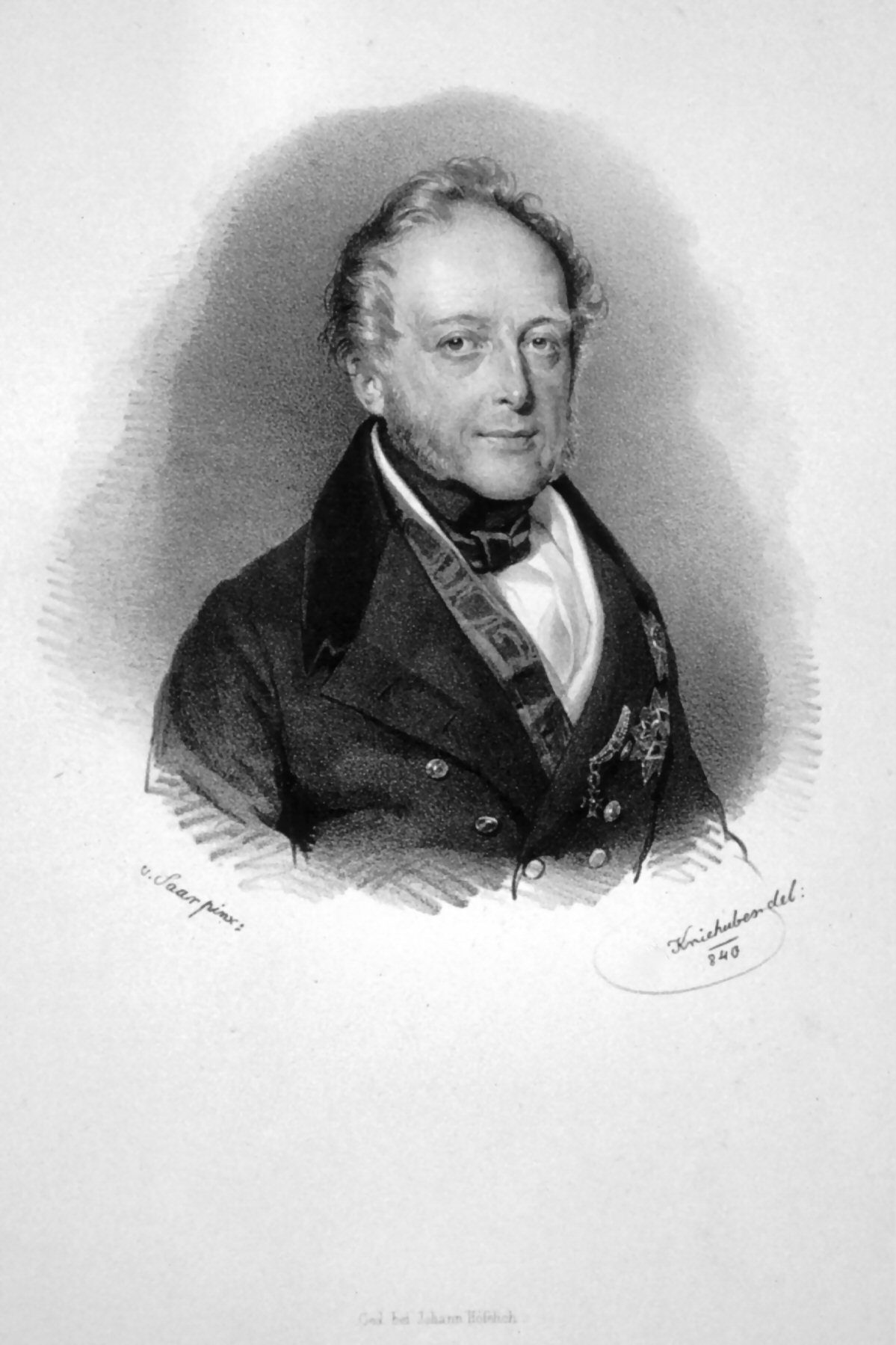
Rudolf von Lützow (1840)

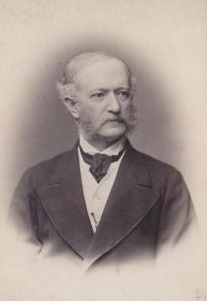
Heinrich von Haymerle (1878)

- 1804–1808: Karl Hemricourt
- 1808–1810: Friedrich Binder von Krieglstein (Charge d'Affaires)
- 1810–1812: Franz Binder von Krieglstein
- 1812–1815: Rudolf von Lützow
- 1815–1825: August Ernst von Steigentesch
- 1825–1829: Franz de Paula von Colloredo-Wallsee
- 1829–1846: Eduard George Wilhelm von Langenau (Charge d'Affaires)
- 1846–1851: Maximilian von Vrints zu Falkenstein
- 1851–1856: Eduard von Hartig
- 1856–1858: Karl von Jäger (Charge d'Affaires)
- 1858–1859: Alajos Károlyi
- 1859–1860: Karl von Jäger (Charge d'Affaires)
- 1860–1864: Adolph von Brenner-Felsach

1864: Interruption of relations due to the Danish November Constitution

- 1864–1866: Heinrich Karl von Haymerle (Charge d'Affaires)
- 1866–1866: Felix von Wimpffen
- 1866–1866: Karl von und zu Franckenstein (Charge d'Affaires)

=== Austro-Hungarian Ambassadors ===
- 1866–1869: Ludwig von Paar
- 1869–1872: Karl von Eder
- 1872–1873: Ludwig von Paar
- 1873–1874: Emanuel von Salzberg (Charge d'Affaires)
- 1874–1879: Gustav Kálnoky von Kőröspatak
- 1880–1888: Karl von und zu Franckenstein
- 1888–1888: Maximilian von Gagern (Charge d'Affaires)
- 1888–1889: Konstantin von Trauttenberg
- 1889–1907: Christoph von Wydenbruck
- 1907–1908: Iván von Rubido-Zichy (Charge d'Affaires)
- 1908–1917: Dionys Széchényi
- 1917–1918: Otto von Franz (Charge d'Affaires)
- 1918: vacant from 19 July to 11 November

=== Austrian Ambassadors (since 1919) ===
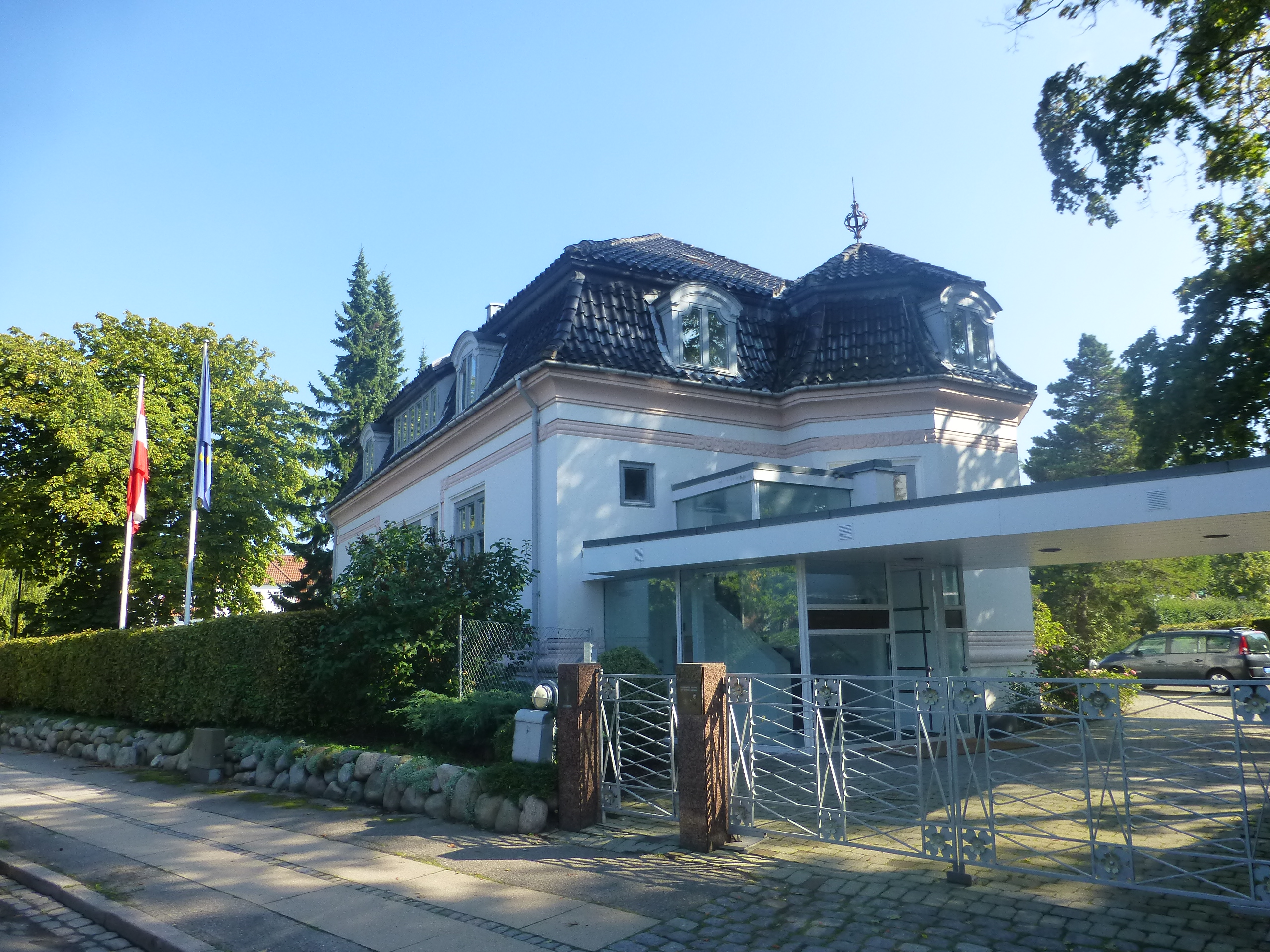
Embassy of Austria, in the Østerbro district of Copenhagen (2013)

...

- 1961–1962: Karl Herbert Schober

...

- 1975–1980: Hedwig Wolfram
- 1980–1981: Erich Pichler

...

- 1989–c. 1993: Gerhard Gmoser
- c. 1992–c. 199?: Franz Wunderbaldinger (co-accredited in Lithuania 1992–1994)

...

- c. 200?–2003: Helmut Wessely
- 2003–2008: Erich Buttenhauser
- 2008–2009: Erwin Kubesch
- 2009–2013: Daniel Krumholz
- 2013–: Ernst-Peter Brezovszky
- 2017–2021: Maria Rotheiser-Scotti
- 2021–present: Alice Irvin

== See also ==
- Foreign relations of Austria
- Foreign relations of Denmark
