= Sopronhorpács =

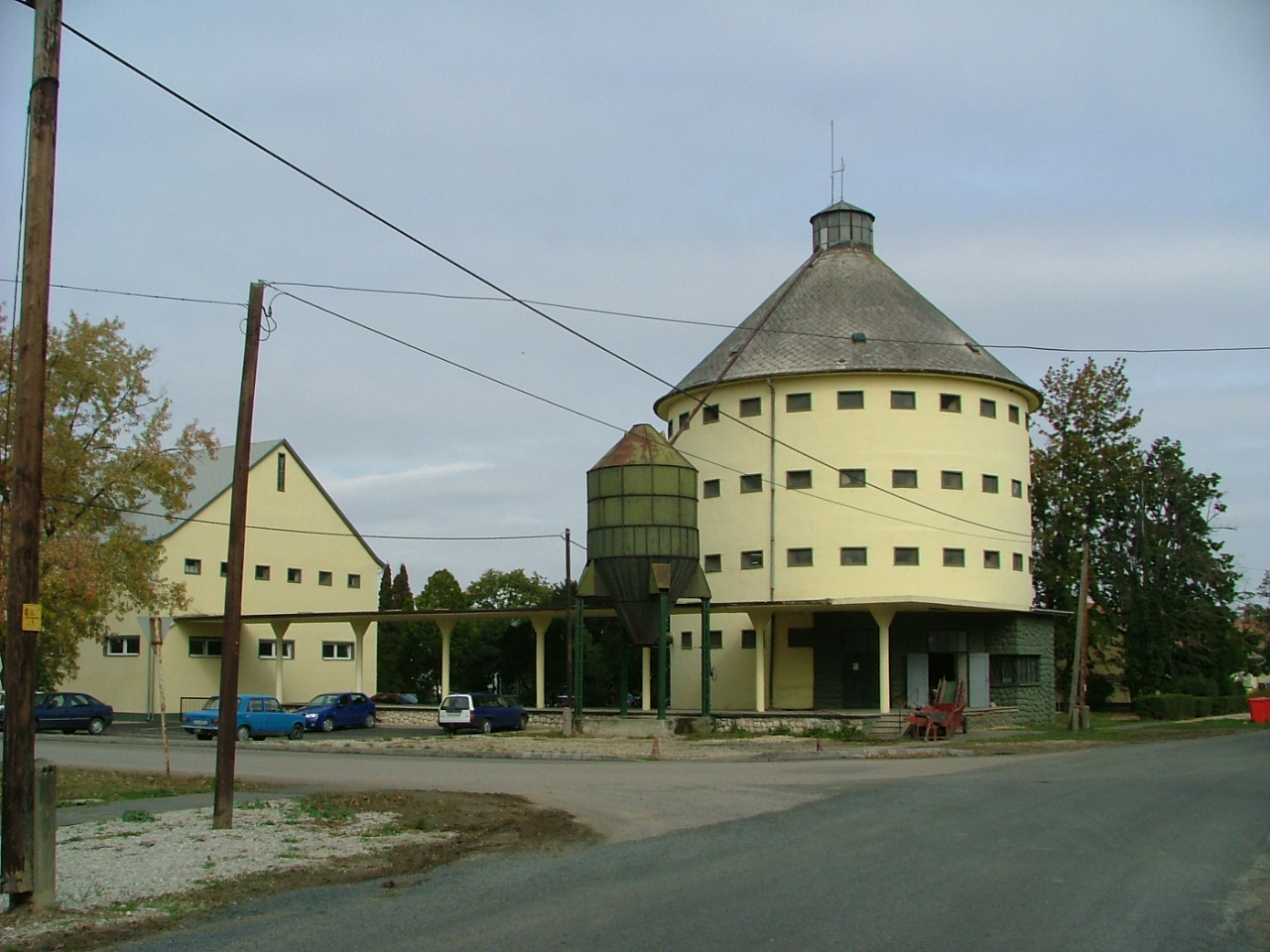

- Flag Coat of arms

- Location of Sopronhorpács in Hungary
- Coordinates: 47.48351°N 16.73821°E
- Country: Hungary
- Region: Western Transdanubia
- County: Győr-Moson-Sopron
- Subregion: Sopron–Fertődi
- Rank: Village

Government
  - Mayor: Talabér Jenő

Area
  - Total: 20.69 km^{2} (7.99 sq mi)

Population (1 January 2008)
  - Total: 842
  - Density: 40.7/km^{2} (105/sq mi)
- Time zone: UTC+1 (CET)
  - Summer (DST): UTC+2 (CEST)
- Postal code: 9463
- Area code: +36 99
- KSH code: 29090
- Website: www.sopronhorpacs.hu

Sopronhorpács is a village in Győr-Moson-Sopron County in Hungary.

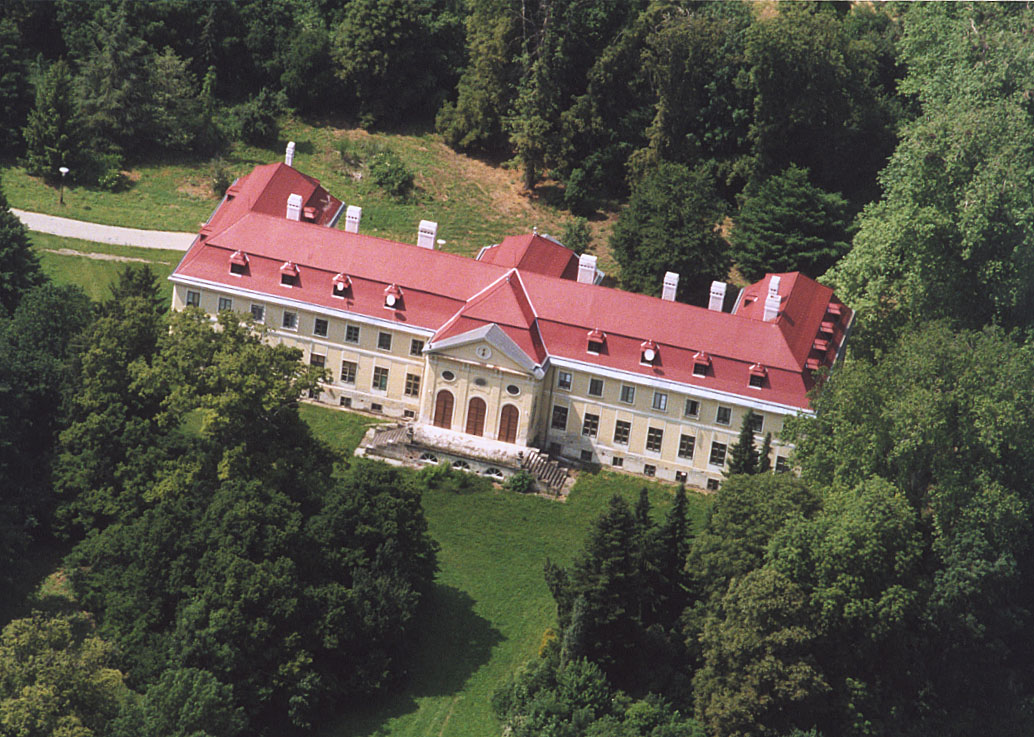
Széchenyi Castle

== Sightseeing ==
=== Parochial church ===
The parochial church of the village was built in the 12th century in Romanesque style. Its western doorway was built around 1230 together with the southern nave. The baroque towers were built in the 18th century.

=== Széchenyi castle ===
The castle was built by the widow of Zsigmond Széchenyi between 1771 and 1774. It was rebuilt by Count Ferenc Széchényi, who also extended it with a library. It was later renewed in baroque style. In this castle the Hungarian composer Ferenc Liszt pianist played sometimes.
