= Endre Hadik-Barkóczy =

Hungarian politician

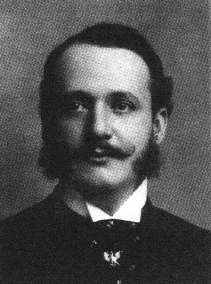

Speaker of the House of Magnates
- In office 19 June 1917 – 22 June 1918
- Preceded by: Sámuel Jósika
- Succeeded by: Gyula Wlassics

Personal details
- Born: 1 November 1862; Pálóc, Kingdom of Hungary, Austrian Empire (now Pavlovce nad Uhom, Slovakia)
- Died: 4 March 1931 (aged 68); Budapest, Hungary
- Profession: politician

Count Endre Hadik-Barkóczy de Futak et Szala (1 November 1862 – 4 March 1931) was a Hungarian politician, who served as Speaker of the House of Magnates between 1917 and 1918.

== Biography ==
He was born as Count Endre Hadik de Futak into a Roman Catholic noble family (with the title of Count since 1763) in Pálóc (today: Pavlovce nad Uhom, Slovakia), Ung County, Kingdom of Hungary on 1 November 1862. His parents were Count Béla Hadik de Futak, a Rear Admiral and Privy Councillor, and Countess Ilona Barkóczy de Szala, only daughter and heir of Count János Barkóczy. His brothers were János, Minister of Food, Prime Minister of Hungary for a short time in 1918; Sándor, a Member of Parliament; Miksa, an ambassador and Béla, who served as Lord Lieutenant (Count; comes) of Zemplén County.

He studied in Kassa (today: Kosice, Slovakia) and his economic study at the University of Hohenheim. He added his mother's name and title to his last name with the permission of Emperor-King Francis Joseph I on 17 July 1887 after the death of Ilona Barkóczy. He also owned the Barkóczy family property ("entail"). He married Countess Klára Zichy de Zich et Vásonkeő on 8 January 1895. They had two children, Eleonóra and Endre the Younger.

Hadik-Barkóczy became a heritage member of the House of Magnates in 1888. He was a member of the Committee of Evaluation from 1890 to 1892. He was admitted as a Knight of Honour and Devotion of the Sovereign Military Order of Malta in 1891.

He was elected as a Member of the House of Representatives for Görgő (today: Spišský Hrhov, Slovakia) in 1892. He was a representative of the governing Liberal Party. He held his seat until 1896. He became MP again in 1901 for Nagymihály (today: Michalovce, Slovakia). He was awarded Privy Councillor by the King in 1903. After the infamous and scandalous "handkerchief vote" on 18 November 1904, when the ruling party voted for more stringent Standing Orders of the Parliament by MP Gábor Daniel illegally to the breaking of obstruction, he left the Liberal Party and joined Gyula Andrássy the Younger's "dissident group" which later formed as National Constitution Party. He was a candidate in the 1905 parliamentary elections but did not gain a seat. From that time he continued his political career in the House of Magnates. He was appointed Speaker of the Upper House in 1917, replacing Sámuel Jósika. He resigned on 22 June 1918. He was a member of the upper house for a short time in 1927.

Political offices
Preceded by Sámuel Jósika	Speaker of the House of Magnates; 1917–1918	Succeeded by Gyula Wlassics
