= Miksa Hadik =

Hungarian diplomat

Austro-Hungarian Ambassador to Mexico
- In office 21 March 1909 – 30 June 1911
- Preceded by: Karl Freiherr von Giskra
- Succeeded by: Franz Freiherr Riedl von Riedenau

Personal details
- Born: 1868
- Died: 1921 (aged 52–53)
- Profession: diplomat

Count Miksa Hadik de Futak (German: Maximilian Graf Hadik von Futak) (1868–1921) was a Hungarian diplomat, who served as Austro-Hungarian minister to Mexico from 1909 to 1911 and to Sweden from 1912 to 1918, until end of the First World War.

== Family ==
His parents were Count Béla Hadik de Futak, a Rear Admiral and Privy Councillor, and Countess Ilona Barkóczy de Szala, only daughter and heir of Count János Barkóczy. His brothers were Endre, Speaker of the House of Magnates; János, Minister of Food, Prime Minister of Hungary for a short time in 1918; Sándor, a Member of Parliament and Béla, who served as Lord Lieutenant (Count; comes) of Zemplén County.

Diplomatic posts
Preceded by Karl Freiherr von Giskra	Austro-Hungarian Ambassador to Mexico; 1909–1911	Succeeded by Franz Freiherr Riedl von Riedenau
Preceded by Konstantin Dumba	Austro-Hungarian Ambassador to Sweden; 1912–1918	Succeeded by office abolished
