= Cornelius Vanderbilt II =

American businessman (1843–1899)

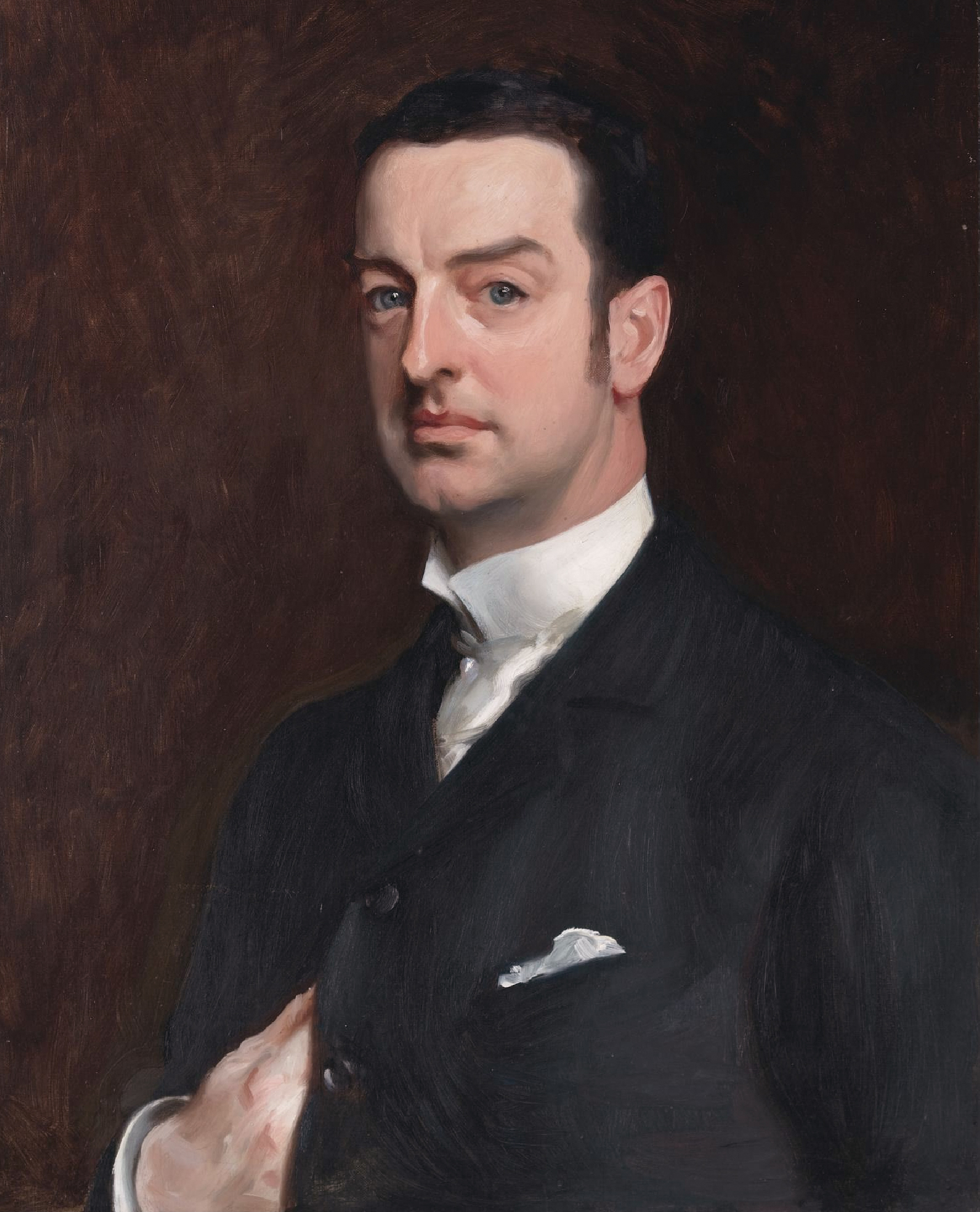
- Portrait of Vanderbilt by John Singer Sargent
- Born: November 27, 1843; Staten Island, New York, U.S.
- Died: September 12, 1899 (aged 55); New York City, U.S.
- Resting place: Vanderbilt Family Mausoleum, Staten Island, New York, U.S.
- Employer: New York Central Railroad
- Political party: Republican
- Spouse: Alice Claypoole Vanderbilt (m. 1867)
- Children: Alice Gwynne Vanderbilt; William Henry Vanderbilt II; Cornelius Vanderbilt III; Gertrude Vanderbilt; Alfred Gwynne Vanderbilt; Reginald Claypoole Vanderbilt; Gladys Moore Vanderbilt
- Parent(s): William Henry Vanderbilt; Maria Louisa Kissam
- Relatives: See Vanderbilt family

Cornelius "Corneil" Vanderbilt II (November 27, 1843 – September 12, 1899) was an American businessman, chairman and president of railroad lines. A socialite and philanthropist, he was a member of the prominent United States Vanderbilt family.

== Noted forebears ==
He was the favorite grandson of Commodore Cornelius Vanderbilt, who bequeathed him $5 million, and the eldest son of William Henry "Billy" Vanderbilt (who bequeathed him about $70 million) and Maria Louisa Kissam. In his turn, he succeeded them as the chairman and the president of the New York Central and related railroad lines in 1885.

== Early life ==
Cornelius Vanderbilt II was born on November 27, 1843, on Staten Island, New York to William Henry Vanderbilt (1821–1885) and Maria Louisa Kissam. He was educated at Columbia College.

== Career ==
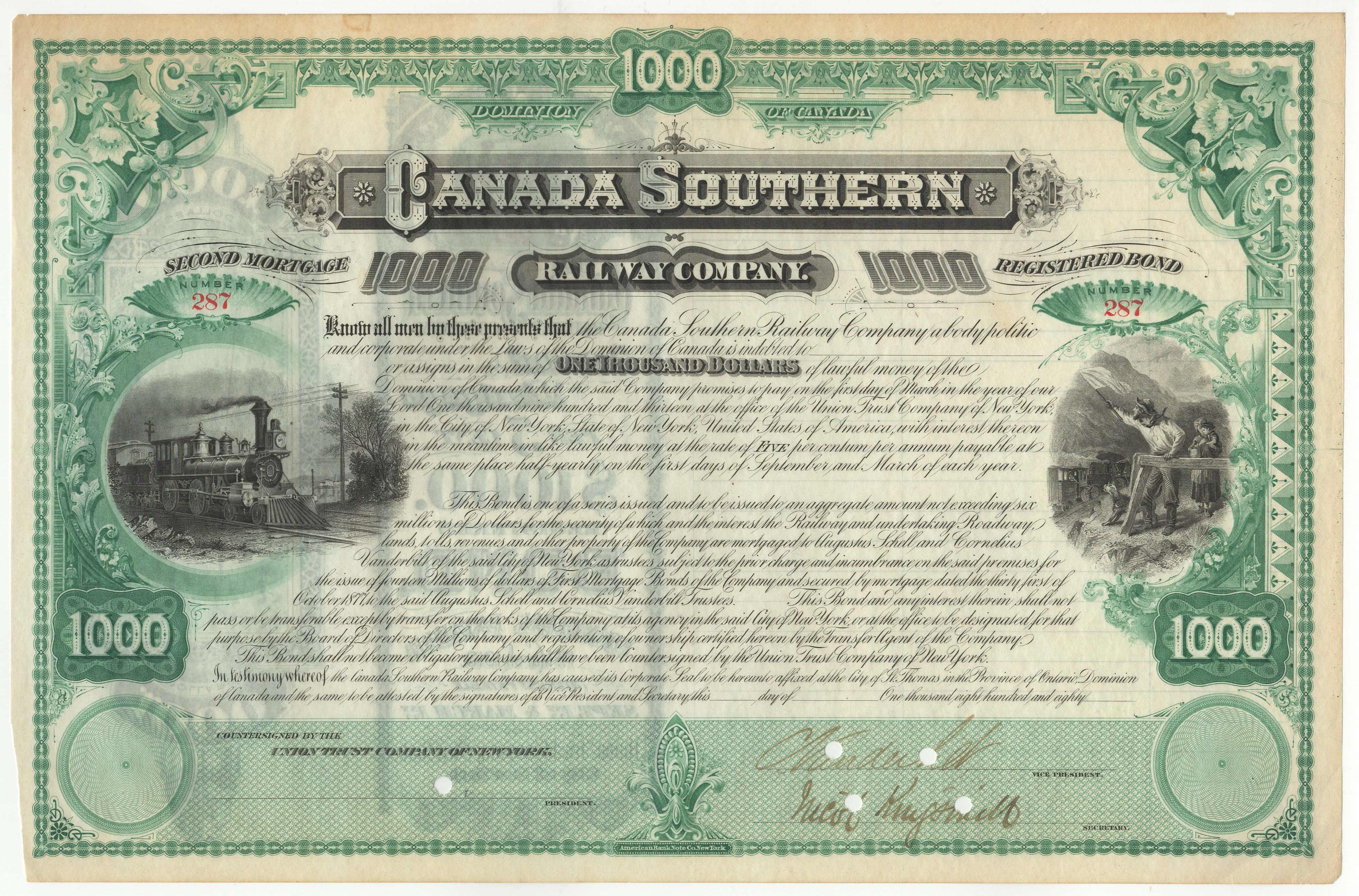
Unissued bond of the Canada Southern Railway Company, signed by vice-president Cornelius Vanderbilt II

Vanderbilt established a reputation for a strong work ethic while clerking at the Shoe and Leather Bank in New York City. This endeared him to his grandfather, the 'Commodore,' who was a strong believer in personal industry.

Vanderbilt was active in numerous organizations, including the Saint Nicholas Society of the City of New York, YMCA, Red Cross, Salvation Army, Trinity Church, St. Bartholomew's Church, Sunday Breakfast Association, and the Newport Country Club.

== Personal life and death ==
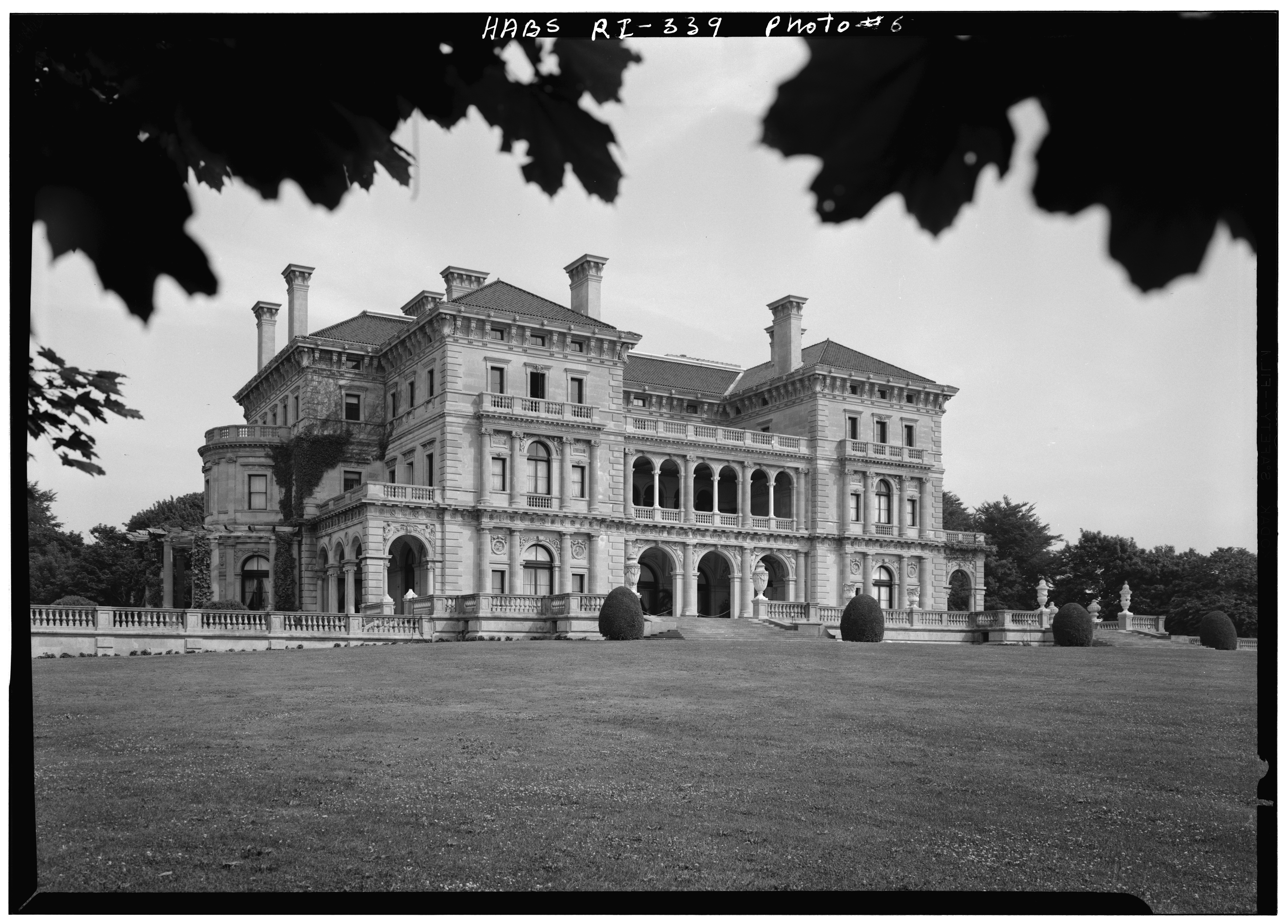
Vanderbilt's Newport cottage, The Breakers, built in 1893 by Richard Morris Hunt

On February 4, 1867, he married Alice Claypoole Gwynne (1845–1934), daughter of Abraham Evan Gwynne and Rachel Moore Flagg. The two met at St. Bartholomew's Episcopal Church where both taught Sunday school.

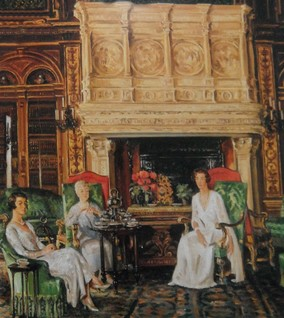
Mrs. Cornelius Vanderbilt II and her daughters, Gladys and Gertrude, having tea in the library at the Breakers, Newport, Rhode Island. William Bruce Ellis Ranken, 1932

Together, they had seven children:

- Alice Gwynne Vanderbilt (1869–1874), who died of a childhood illness at the age of five.
- William Henry Vanderbilt II (1870–1892), who died of typhoid fever while attending Yale University.
- Cornelius "Neily" Vanderbilt III (1873–1942), whom his father disinherited for marrying Grace Graham Wilson (1870–1953) without his approval.
- Gertrude Vanderbilt (1875–1942), who married Harry Payne Whitney (1872–1930)
- Alfred Gwynne Vanderbilt (1877–1915), who died aboard the RMS Lusitania, and who married Ellen French, and after their divorce, Margaret Emerson (1884–1960).
- Reginald Claypoole Vanderbilt (1880–1925), who first married society debutante Cathleen Neilson, and later Gloria Morgan.
- Gladys Moore Vanderbilt (1886–1965), who married Count László Széchenyi (1879–1938).

A stroke in 1896 compelled him to reduce his active business involvement. He died of a cerebral hemorrhage shortly after 6 a.m. on September 12, 1899, at his home on West Fifty-seventh Street in Manhattan, New York City.

Upon his death, family leadership passed to his first brother, William Kissam Vanderbilt.

=== Estate ===
Vanderbilt's philanthropy had been such that he did not increase the wealth that had been left to him. His estate at the time of his death was appraised at $72,999,867, $20 million of which was real estate. In 2025 dollars, $73 million is equivalent to $2.83 billion.

In the weeks following Cornelius Vanderbilt II's death, the terms of his will sparked a minor controversy within New York society when it was revealed that Vanderbilt's eldest surviving son, Cornelius Vanderbilt III, was to receive a substantially smaller share of his estate compared to his siblings. In his place Vanderbilt's second surviving son, Alfred Gwynne Vanderbilt, was named as the principal beneficiary, inheriting over half of the fortune as well as the Gold Congressional Medallion awarded to his grandfather, 'Commodore' Cornelius Vanderbilt I, by the United States Congress—an heirloom which had come to symbolise headship of the Vanderbilt family. The final version of the will bore the date 18 June 1896, the same day originally intended for the wedding of Cornelius Vanderbilt III to Grace Wilson despite his parents' disapproval of the union.

Under the terms of the Will, the bulk of Vanderbilt's estate was divided amongst his widow and children:

- His widow, Alice Claypoole Vanderbilt received an income of $250,000 annually for her life from a $7,000,000 Trust Fund, which she had the power to bequeath amongst their descendants under her Will in whatever proportions she saw fit. Alice also received $2,000,000 outright, the Family's Box at the Metropolitan Opera, a life interest in their Newport Estate The Breakers, and a life interest in their Manhattan Townhouse Cornelius Vanderbilt II House at 1 West 57th Street, Manhattan. The Will also gave Alice the power to leave their Newport and Manhattan homes to any of their children.
- $20,000,000 was placed in a trust fund to be shared equally between his four younger children Gertrude Vanderbilt Whitney, Alfred Gwynne Vanderbilt I, Reginald Claypoole Vanderbilt, Gladys Vanderbilt Széchenyi.
- The $5,000,000 Trust Fund which Vanderbilt had been bequeathed by his father William Henry Vanderbilt I (which had increased in value to $6,420,000 when Cornelius Vanderbilt II died) was split between Vanderbilt's five surviving children. Cornelius Vanderbilt III received $500,000, with the remaining amount split between Alfred, Gertrude, Reginald and Gladys, who each received approximately $1,480,000 from this Trust.
- $1,000,000 was placed in a Trust Fund, with the income payable to Vanderbilt's eldest surviving son Cornelius Vanderbilt III
- Vanderbilt bequeathed an additional $1,000,000 lump sum to his daughter Gertrude;
- The residuary estate, estimated to be valued at $28,000,000 to $35,000,000, was bequeathed to Vanderbilt's second-eldest surviving son Alfred Gwynne Vanderbilt I. In the weeks following Vanderbilt's death it became publicly known that Alfred had gifted his elder brother Cornelius Vanderbilt III $6,000,000 from his own inheritance to provide Cornelius Vanderbilt III with a share of their father's estate which was similar to the value bequeathed to their other siblings.

Vanderbilt's Will also provided for a specific bequest of $100,000 to his younger brother Frederick William Vanderbilt, whilst bequests to various other relatives, friends, and servants amounted to $565,000 collectively. Various churches and charitable organisations collectively received charitable bequests totaling $1,020,000.

=== Real estate ===
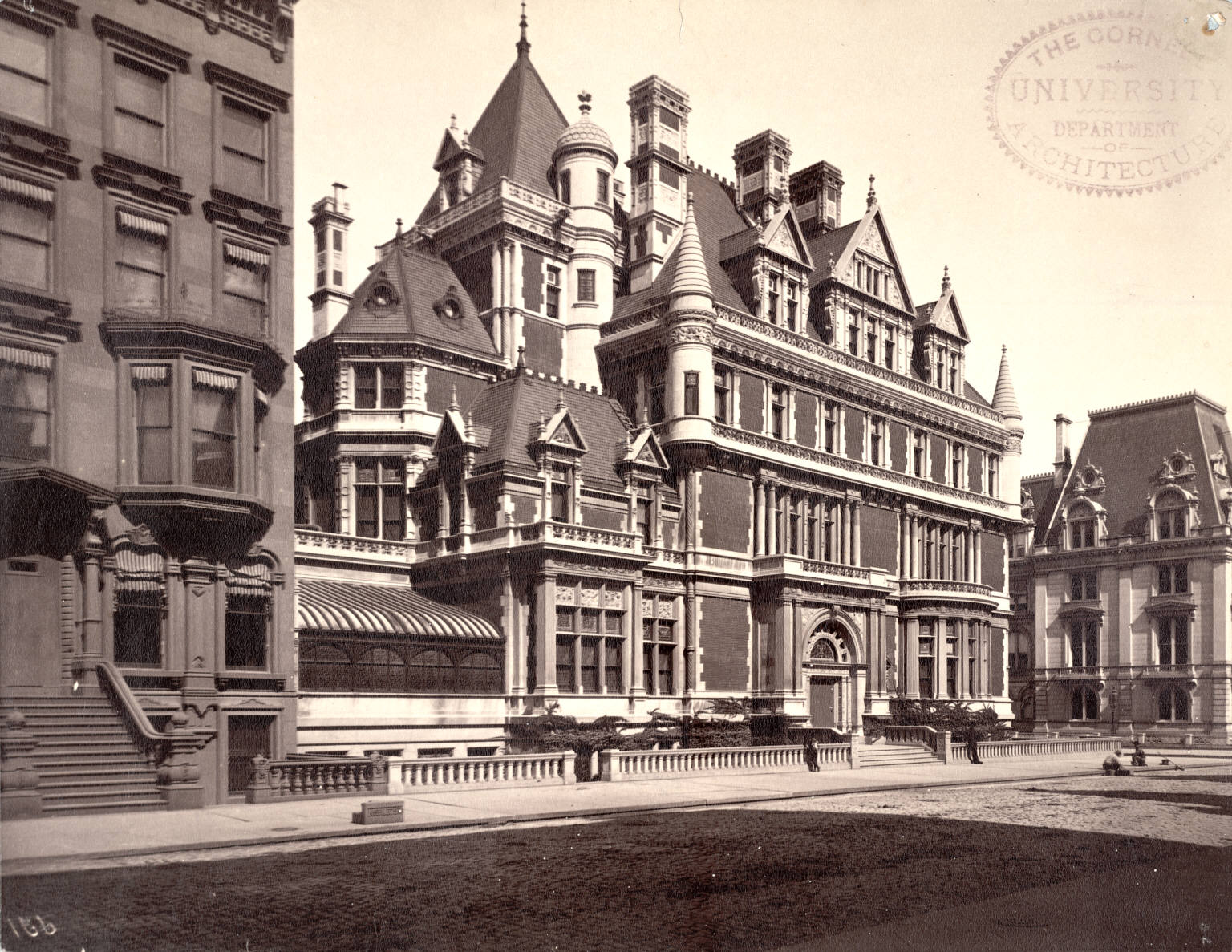
The rear facade of the Cornelius Vanderbilt II House on West 57th Street, New York

The Fifth Avenue mansions that Cornelius Vanderbilt II, his brothers, and his sons lived in have been demolished, including Cornelius Vanderbilt II House.

His 70-room summer residence, The Breakers in Newport, Rhode Island, still stands as a memory of his lifestyle. It is today operated as a historic house museum.

=== Descendants ===
Through his son, Reginald, he was the grandfather of Gloria Laura Vanderbilt, the socialite and fashion designer, and the great-grandfather of news anchor Anderson Hays Cooper.

Through his son, Alfred, he was the grandfather of William Henry Vanderbilt III, Alfred Gwynne Vanderbilt Jr., and George Washington Vanderbilt III.

Through his daughter, Gladys, he was the grandfather of Hungarian-American heiress Alice Széchenyi.

The 1864 Congressional Gold Medal which had been awarded to Cornelius' grandfather, which Cornelius Vanderbilt II in turn bequeathed to his second son Alfred Gwynne Vanderbilt, later passed to Alfred's oldest son William Henry Vanderbilt III in 1915, and then to his only son William Henry Vanderbilt IV in 1981. William H. Vanderbilt IV donated the medal and several other family heirlooms to Vanderbilt University in 2022.

== See also ==
- The Breakers
- Vanderbilt Family
