= Chester College of New England =

Former college in New Hampshire, U.S.

Coordinates: 42°57′34″N 71°15′35″W

- Type: Private liberal arts college
- Active: 1965 (as White Pines College)–2012
- Location: Chester, New Hampshire, U.S.

Chester College of New England was a bachelor's degree-granting college that provided a foundation in the liberal arts and the fine arts, complemented by majors in the professional arts. It opened in 1965 as White Pines College and closed at the end of the 2011–12 academic year for financial reasons. The campus was sold in 2015 and now operates as Busche Academy, a private coeducational boarding and day school.

Located in Chester, New Hampshire, the college offered degree programs in creative writing, professional writing, photography and media arts, graphic design, computer science, fine arts, communication arts and interdisciplinary arts. Chester College also offered minor programs in creative writing, illustration, photojournalism, and writing. The college featured a student-to-faculty ratio of 10:1, artist-in-residence programs, and a program of guest lectures, exhibitions, art and photography exhibits, internships, and relationships with professional associations.

In April 2012, the college disclosed an operating deficit. Despite fundraising efforts, in May 2012, the college's board of trustees announced that they had voted to close the college.

== History ==
The college was founded in 1965 as White Pines College by Faith Preston, Ed.D. The first class was admitted in 1967.

The name of the school was changed in 2002, under Dr. William Nevious, third president of the college. Around this time, the college expanded from a 2-year program to a 4-year college with an emphasis on the arts. Nevious was credited with growth and transformation of the college during his presidency. "Dr. Nevious took this college, which was literally on its death bed, and revived it," said Fred Kocher, a member of the college's board of trustees.

On June 30, 2007, Nevious stepped down as the college's president after six years. Former Manchester mayor Robert Baines was named interim president. Baines served as president of the college until he and the board of trustees decided to close the school in 2012. Prior to the closure of the school the faculty and staff of the college arranged a vote of no confidence against Baines. Baines remained as president until the official closing.

New England College and the New Hampshire Institute of Art (NHIA) each offered to accept Chester students as transfers after the college's closure. Over 80% of the students chose to transfer to NHIA, as did several faculty members.

The campus was sold in 2015 and now operates as Busche Academy, a private coeducational boarding and day school which offers a college preparatory, multicultural education to students in grades 6–12 and postgraduates. The school also hosts summer programs for elementary and middle school students from around the world.

== Visiting Artists and Writers Series ==
The college's Visiting Artists and Writers Series welcomed artists and authors to lecture, sit in on classes, and host readings and gallery exhibits. Notable authors included Steve Almond, Nicholson Baker, Mary Gaitskill, Jennifer Haigh, Sharon Olds, George Saunders, and Michelle Tea. Notable visual artists included Henry Horenstein and Pipo Nguyen-duy.
