= Gladys Vanderbilt Széchenyi =

American socialite (1886–1965)

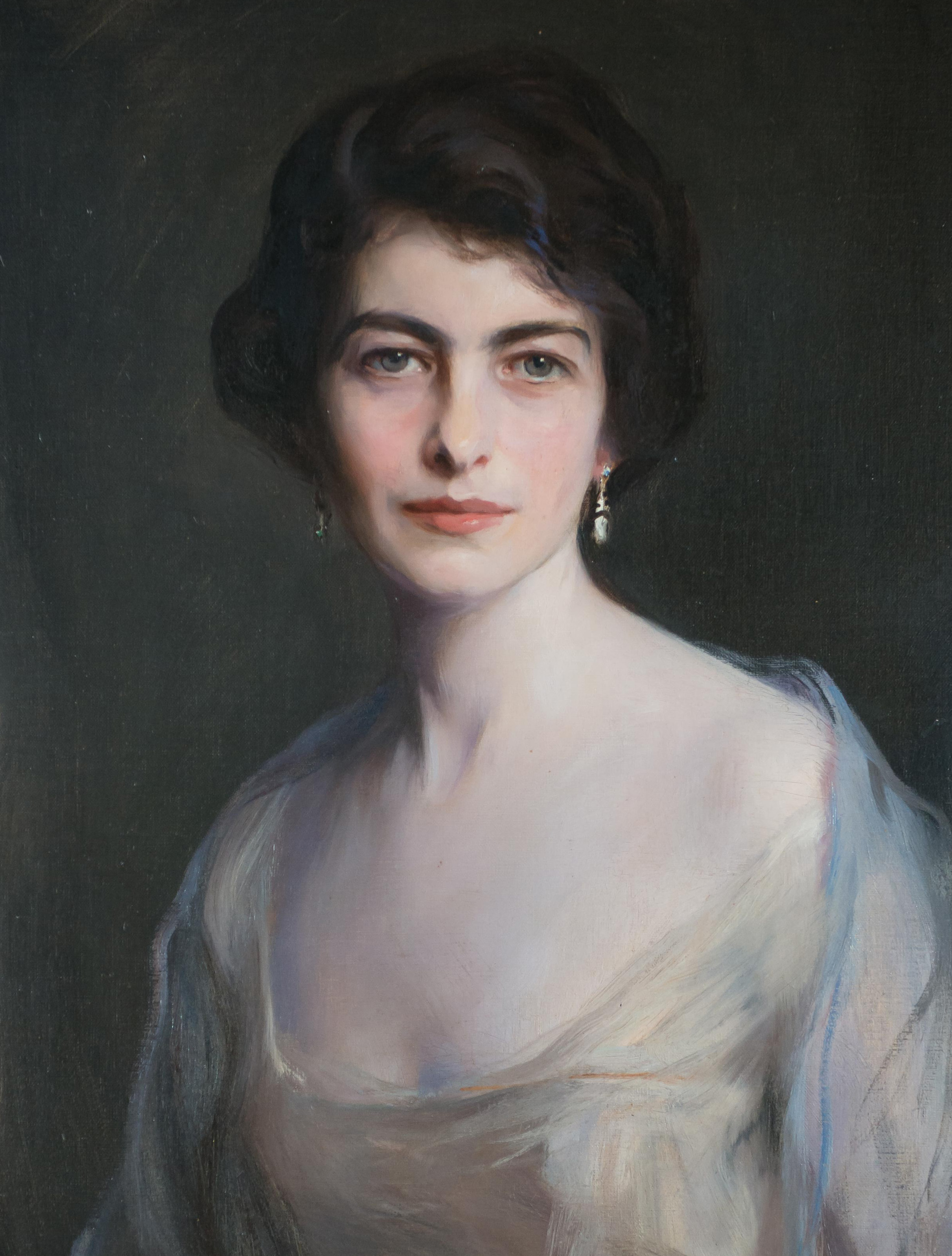
- Portrait by Philip de László, 1921
- Born: Gladys Moore Vanderbilt; August 27, 1886; Newport, Rhode Island, U.S.
- Died: January 29, 1965 (aged 78); Washington, D.C., U.S.
- Title: Countess Széchenyi
- Spouse: Count László Széchenyi (m. 1908; died 1938)
- Children: 5, including Alice Széchenyi
- Parents: Cornelius Vanderbilt II; Alice Claypoole Gwynne
- Family: Vanderbilt (by birth); House of Széchenyi (by marriage)

Gladys Moore Vanderbilt, Countess Széchenyi (August 27, 1886 – January 29, 1965), was an American heiress from the Vanderbilt family and wife of Hungarian Count László Széchenyi. She was an owner of the Breakers, one of the grandest residences in Newport, Rhode Island.

== Early life ==
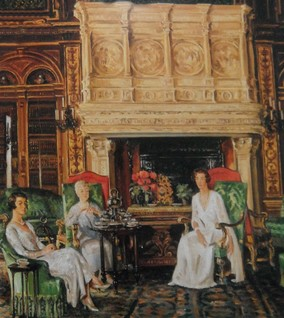
Gladys with her mother and sister Gertrude at The Breakers library, 1932

She was born Gladys Moore Vanderbilt in 1886, the seventh and youngest child of Cornelius Vanderbilt II and his wife Alice Claypoole Gwynne. Her father was the president and chairman of the New York Central Railroad and part of the prominent Vanderbilt family.

She grew up in the largest private house ever built in New York City, The Vanderbilt II family mansion on Fifth Avenue and at their summer "cottage" called The Breakers in Newport, Rhode Island. She attended Miss Chapin's School in New York.

Her first cousin was Consuelo Vanderbilt, Duchess of Marlborough, who had married Charles Spencer-Churchill, 9th Duke of Marlborough.

One of her siblings was Reginald Claypoole Vanderbilt, who was the father of Gloria Vanderbilt, the mother of Anderson Cooper.

== Inheritance ==
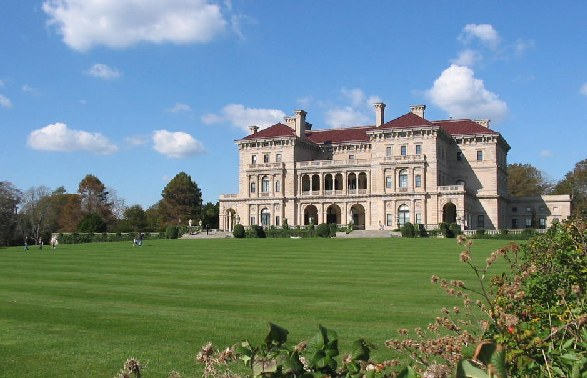
The Breakers, Newport, Rhode Island

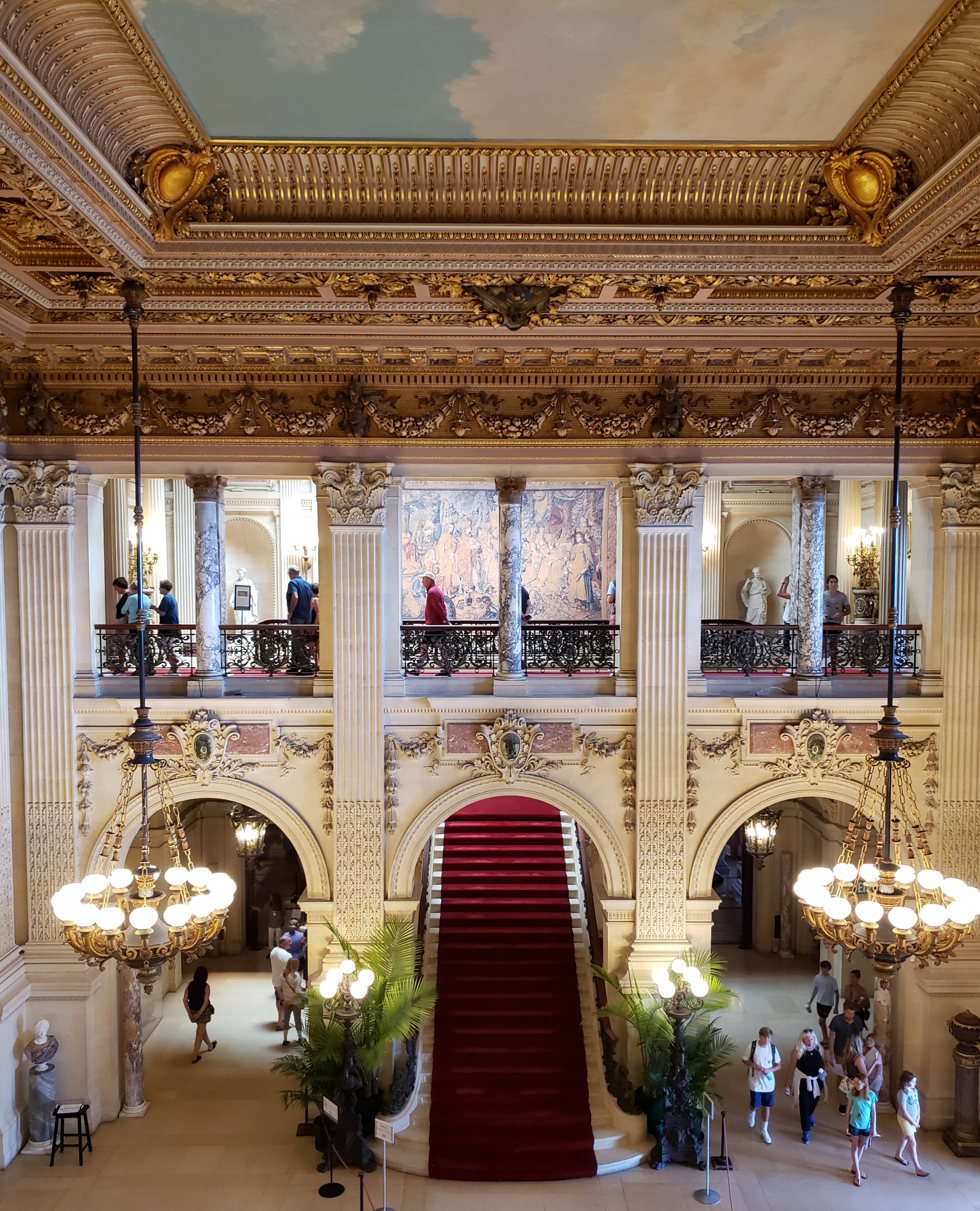
The Breakers's Great Hall

Following her father's death in 1899, the thirteen-year-old Gladys received a $5,000,000 Trust fund and $1,480,000 outright under the terms of his Will. He father bequeathed her mother Alice a life interest in the family's Newport home The Breakers; under the terms of his will, Alice had the right to decide which of their children would inherit the Breakers after her death.

When Alice died in 1934, her will revealed that she bequeathed the Breakers and approximately $3,500,000 to Gladys.

=== The Breakers, Newport ===
Despite the generous inheritances Gladys had received from both of her parents, during the months following Alice's death there was widespread speculation amongst the Newport elite that she would not open the house, based on a commonly-held belief that she did not possess the financial resources required to maintain the house and the large staff necessary for its upkeep. In 1935 the Washington Herald reported that it was common knowledge in local circles that Gladys considered her mother's decision to bequeath The Breakers to her as more of a liability than a gift, and it was rumoured that an offer had been made to her by a business syndicate to purchase the property with the intention of transforming the house into a hotel. Gladys took up residence at The Breakers in 1936, although the house was not occupied by Gladys and her family during the period between 1939 to 1942; instead summers were spent at the Newport home of her elder sister Gertrude Vanderbilt Whitney.

Following America's entry into the Second World War, Gladys offered The Breakers to the Civilian Defense Council in 1942, after which it was temporarily known as "Newport No. 1 air raid shelter". The house was the site of a major civilian air-raid drill in January 1943, at which Gladys was present in her capacity as Red Cross Volunteer.

In 1948 Gladys agreed to lease her Newport home The Breakers to The Preservation Society of Newport for a token rent of $1 per year. Revenues from tours and ticket sales were paid to The Preservation Society, whilst Gladys continued to meet the cost of property taxes, insurance and major repairs. The cost of property taxes for 1964 was reportedly $16,046. The Preservation Society continued to operate The Breakers as a tourist attraction, whilst Gladys maintained a private apartment made up of the southern half of the third floor of the house.

The part of the house which was converted to Gladys' private apartment had previously been the living quarters of her three brothers at the time of the house's construction, and had been decorated by Ogden Codman Jr.. The apartment contained eight bedrooms, a living room with ocean views, and a small kitchen converted from a former housekeeper's room. Access from the museum floors open to the public was said to initially have blocked with infant safety-gate on a staircase connecting the second and third storeys.

== War aid ==
In 1914, during World War I, she placed her palace in Budapest at the disposal of the army. Shortly thereafter, 600 reservists were quartered there, and she further intended to use the palace as a hospital.

== Personal life ==
=== Marriage and children ===
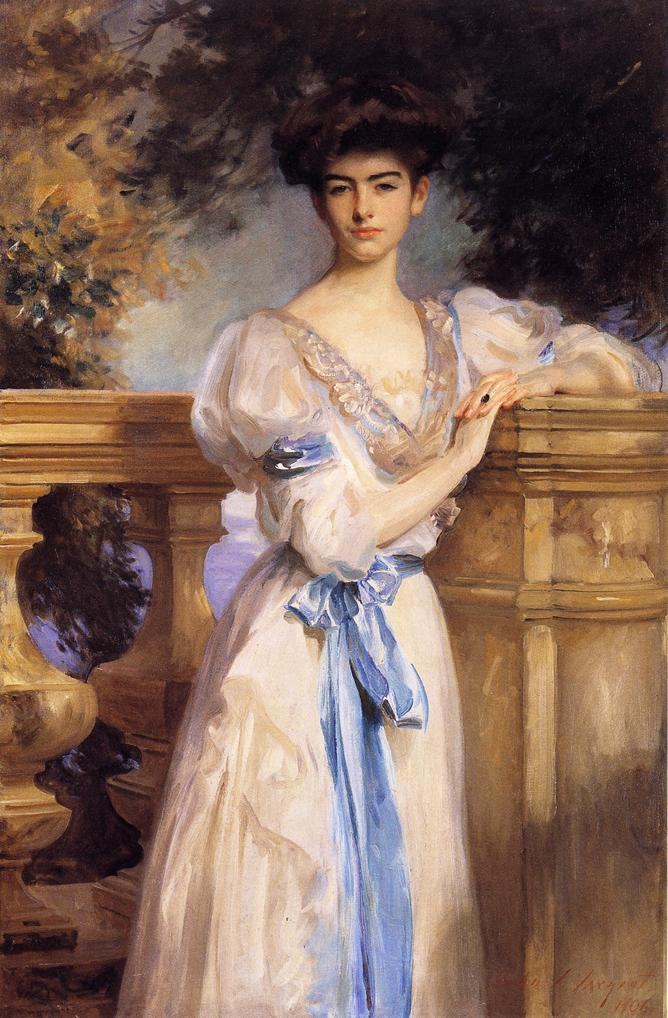
Gladys Vanderbilt by John Singer Sargent, 1906

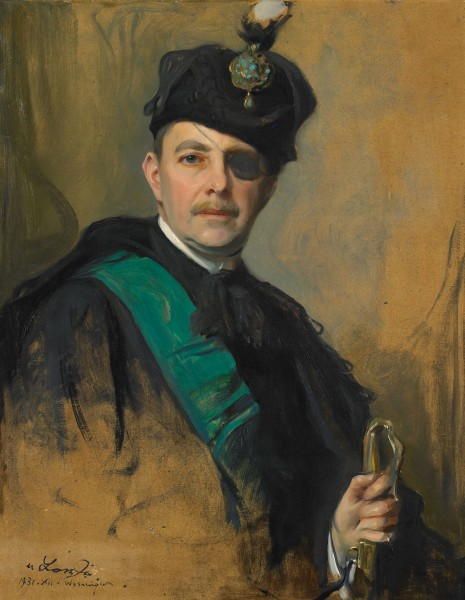
Count László Széchenyi wearing Hungarian díszmagyar by Philip de László 1931

On January 27, 1908, she married Hungarian aristocrat Count László Széchenyi de Sárvár-Felsővidék in New York City. Their union was the most talked about and widely reported since her cousin Consuelo Vanderbilt's. The couple visited Hungary almost every summer with their five daughters:

- Countess Cornelia Széchényi de Sárvár-Felsővidék (1908–1958), nicknamed "Gilia", who married Eugene Bowie Roberts (1898–1983), with whom she had three children:
  - Gladys Vanderbilt Roberts, who married Landon Thomas Jr.
  - Cornelia Carter Roberts (1936–1982), nicknamed "Nini", who married Count Hans-Heinrich von Coudenhove-Kalergi (1926–2004).
  - Eugene Bowie Roberts Jr. (1939–2020).
- Countess Alice Széchényi de Sárvár-Felsővidék (1911–1974), nicknamed "Ai", who married Count Béla Hadik (1905–1971).
  - Count László Hadik (1932–1973), who died in an aircraft accident.
  - Count János Béla Hadik (1933–2004).
- Countess Gladys Széchényi de Sárvár-Felsővidék (1913–1978), nicknamed "Glady", who married Christopher Finch-Hatton, 15th Earl of Winchilsea (1911–1950), with whom she had two sons:
  - Christopher Finch-Hatton, 16th Earl of Winchilsea (1936–1999).
  - The Hon. Robin Heneage Finch-Hatton (1939–2018).
- Countess Sylvia Széchényi de Sárvár-Felsővidék (1918–1998), nicknamed "Sylvie", who married Count Antal Szapáry (1905–1972), with whom she had two children:
  - Count Pál László Szapáry (born 1950).
  - Countess Gladys Vanderbilt Szapáry (born 1952).
- Countess Ferdinandine Széchényi de Sárvár-Felsővidék (1923–2016), nicknamed "Bubby", who married Count Alexander von und zu Eltz (1911–1977), with whom she had two children:
  - Count Peter von und zu Eltz (born 1948).
  - Count Nicholas von und zu Eltz (1950–2012), nicknamed "Nicky".

=== Personal life ===
In March 1912, Countess Széchenyi's jewelries worth $200,000 ($8 million today) was stolen from her town residence in Budapest, the detective afterward found the jewels in a motor car garage, where they had been hidden by being wrapped in a piece of newspaper behind a barrel. The countess promptly sent a $600 reward to the investigator. Upon learning of this, the Chief of Police issued an order for the money's return, stating that the police officer had fulfilled his duties and didn't need any further compensation.

Her sister Gertrude was married to Harry Payne Whitney, brother to Dorothy Payne Whitney, whose son Whitney Straight married Lord Winchilsea's sister, Lady Daphne Finch-Hatton.

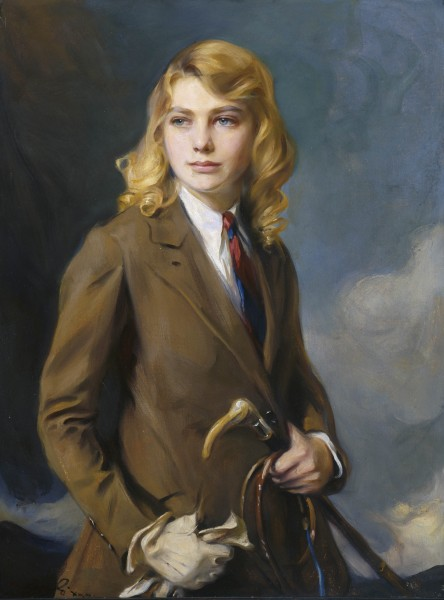
Countess Sylvia Széchényi in riding habit by Philip de László 1931

In 1913, there were rumors that she was going to leave her husband due to his financial woes, including gambling away all of her dowry.

In 1951, she donated her mother's iconic Electric Light dress to the Museum of the City of New York.

== Death and estate ==
Gladys died in 1965; in her will she bequeathed The Breakers in equal shares to her four surviving daughters, as well as the three children of her eldest daughter Cornelia, who had predeceased her mother in 1958. The will stipulated that the family had a year from the date of Gladys' death to determine if they wished to retain the property or disclaim it; if they chose to disclaim the property, it would pass into the ownership of the Preservation Society of Newport. If the Society in turn chose not to accept the bequest, the Breakers would then pass into the ownership of The United States National Trust for Historial Preservation.

The executors of Gladys' estate initially determined that the final value of her property was $4,165,431. The United States Internal Revenue Service later disputed this claim in the U.S. Tax Courts in 1969, alledging that the actual value of the estate should have been assessed at $8,229,015; from this $3.6 million increase in valuation the IRS would be entitled to deduct approximately $2.6 million in estate taxes.

At the centre of this dispute were several Trusts which Gladys had established during her lifetime for her children and descendants, including:

- $1,484,524 placed in Trust in 1939 for her daughter Gladys;
- $159,722 placed in Trust in 1939 and $779,812 placed in trust in 1942 for her daughter Nadine;
- $140,052 placed in Trust in 1939 and $779,245 placed in Trust in 1942 for her daughter Sylvia; and,
- $283,726 placed in Trust in 1939 for her daughter Alice.

These trusts were formed from the life interest in a $5,000,000 trust fund which Gladys had received under her father's Will; the IRS alleged that despite establishing new Trust funds for her daughters' benefit, Gladys had maintained a life interest in this Trust and that the new Trusts were revokeable, and therefore legally still part of Gladys' estate for the purposes of determining the amount of estate tax payable.

As part of the dispute, the initial $192,000 valuation of The Breakers was disputed, with the IRS claiming that the value of the property when Gladys died should have been assessed at $250,000. In 1972, the Newport Preservation Society purchased The Breakers for $365,000 from her heirs. The family members who sold the property gifted much of its furniture and contents to the Preservation Society of Newport. Her daughter, Countess Sylvia Szapáry, maintained a residence at The Breakers on the third floor until her death on March 1, 1998.
