= Henry Collins Flagg =

American politician (1792–1863)

Mayor of New Haven, Connecticut
- In office 1834–1839
- Preceded by: Noyes Darling
- Succeeded by: Samuel Johnson Hitchcock

Personal details
- Born: January 5, 1792 Berkeley County, South Carolina, U.S.
- Died: March 8, 1863 (aged 71) New Haven, Connecticut, U.S.
- Party: Federalist
- Spouse: Martha Whiting (m. 1811)
- Relations: Washington Allston (half-brother); Alice Claypoole Vanderbilt (granddaughter); Ernest Flagg (grandson)
- Children: 7, including George, Jared
- Parents: Henry Collins Flagg Sr.; Rachel Moore
- Education: Yale College
- Occupation: Lawyer, editor, politician

Henry Collins Flagg Jr. (January 5, 1792 – March 8, 1863) was an American lawyer, newspaper editor, and politician. He was the maternal grandfather of Alice Claypoole Vanderbilt.

== Early life ==
Henry Coins Flagg Jr. was born in the parish of St. Thomas, near Charleston, South Carolina on January 5, 1792. His parents were Henry Collins Flagg Sr. (1742–1801) and Rachel (née Moore) Flagg (1757–1839). Flagg's father and namesake served through the American Revolutionary War and was a wealthy shipping merchant from Newport, Rhode Island. Flagg himself was the younger half-brother of painter Washington Allston (1779–1843), from his mother's previous marriage to Captain William Allston, who died in 1781, shortly after the Battle of Cowpens.

Some of his early studies were pursued in Newport, Rhode Island. He graduated from Yale College in 1811.

== Career ==
After leaving college he returned to South Carolina, and remained there for some years. He returned to New Haven, Connecticut and studied law with S.P. Staples, Esq., and began to engage in the practice of law. He took an active part in the political movements opposed to the Federalist Party in Connecticut, both as a public speaker and as an editor of the Connecticut Herald, which he had purchased. He was Clerk of the New Haven County Court.

About 1824, he returned to South Carolina, where he practiced law until 1833. Flagg's attachment to his native State was strong, but his devotion to the Union was stronger, and like his friend, James L. Petigru, with whom, side by side, he withstood the nullifiers in 1832, he was true to the last. Designing to educate his children at the North, he then again took up his residence in New Haven, where his home continued till his death. He practiced law until 1842 when he retired. From 1834 to 1839 he was Mayor of New Haven.

== Personal life ==
On March 20, 1811, Flagg was married to Martha Whiting (1792–1875), the daughter of William Joseph Whiting. Together, they had seven children:

- Henry Collins Flagg III (1811–1862), who married Olivia Moss Sherman (1816–1903).
- Mary Allston Flagg (1814–1877), who married George Sherman (1808–1889).
- George Whiting Flagg (1816–1897), who married Louisa Henriques.
- William Joseph Flagg (1818–1898), who married Eliza Longworth (1809–1891), daughter of Nicholas Longworth.
- Jared Bradley Flagg (1820–1899), who married Sarah Montague (1823–1844) in 1841, Amelia Louisa Hart (1828–1867) in 1846, and thirdly, Josephine Bond (1832–1911) in 1869.
- Rachel Moore Flagg (1822–1884), who first married Abraham Evan Gwynne (1821–1855) and was the mother of Alice Claypoole Vanderbilt. After his death, she married Albert Mathews (1820–1903).
- Edward Octavius Flagg (1824–1911), who married Mary Letitia Ferris (1839–1926).

His wife and seven children survived him upon his death at age 71, March 8, 1863 in New Haven, Connecticut.

=== Descendants ===
Through his daughter Rachel, he was the maternal grandfather of Alice Claypoole Gwynne, who married Cornelius Vanderbilt II in 1867.

Through his son Jared, he was the paternal grandfather of the American architect Ernest Flagg.
