= Gwynne Building =

- U.S. National Register of Historic Places
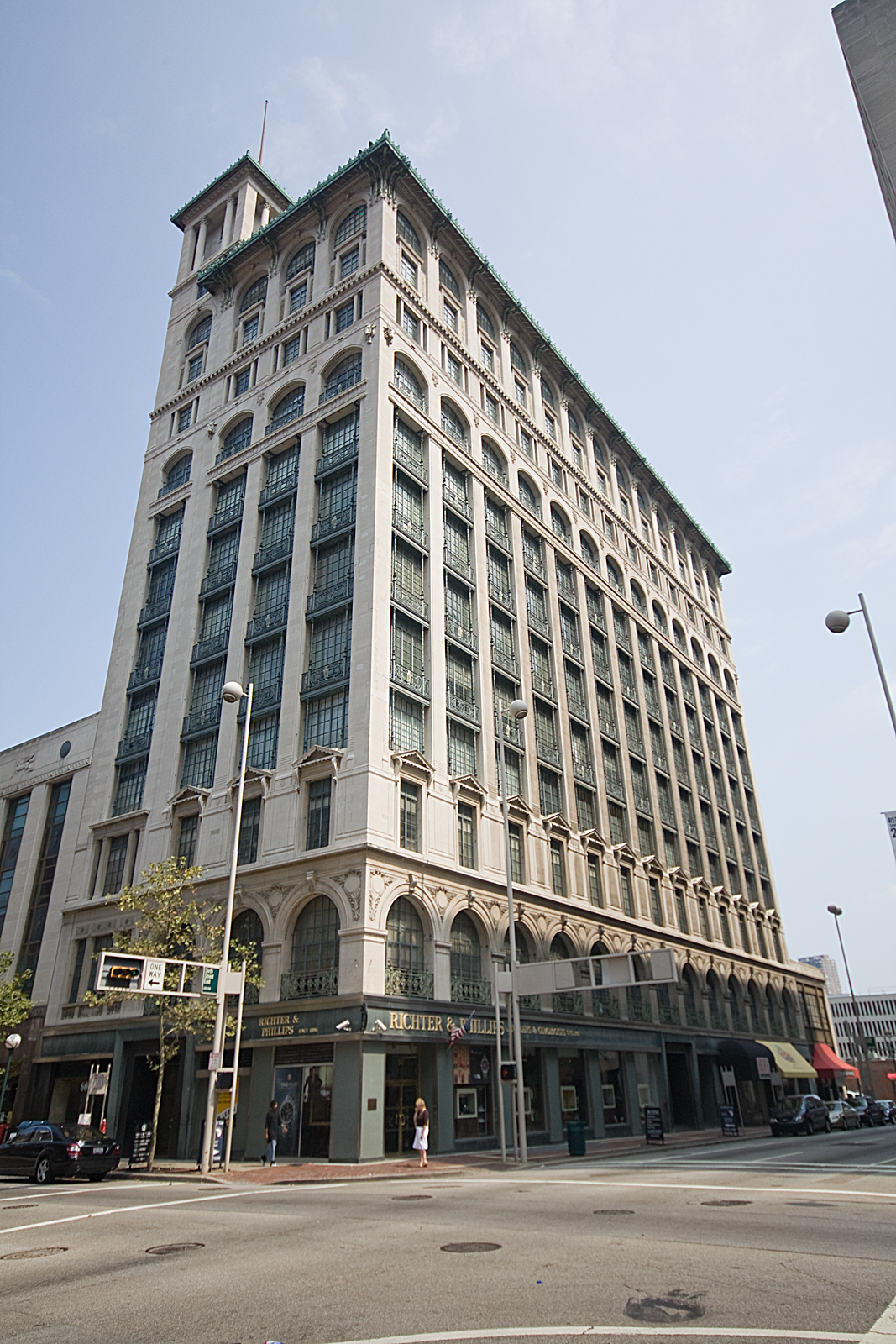

- Location within Ohio Location within the United States
- Location: 6th and Main Sts, Cincinnati, Ohio
- Coordinates: 39°6′11″N 84°30′36″W
- Built: 1913
- Architect: Ernest Flagg
- Architectural style: Beaux-Arts
- NRHP reference No.: 79001856
- Added to NRHP: August 3, 1979

Gwynne Building is a registered historic building in Cincinnati, Ohio, listed in the National Register on August 3, 1979. After a major renovation, the building reopened in July 2026 as Cincinnati's Fidelity Hotel.

== History ==
The almost 125,000-square-foot thirteen-story Gwynne Building was completed in 1913. The building was designed by Ernest Flagg, who also designed the Singer Building in New York and the Corcoran Gallery of Art in Washington, DC.

The structure was commissioned by Flagg's cousin, Alice Gwynne Vanderbilt, who was the wife of Cornelius Vanderbilt II. Alice and Ernest were first cousins as Alice's mother, Rachel Moore Flagg, was the sister of Flagg's father, Jared Bradley Flagg. Alice named the Gwynne Building in honor of her father, Abraham Evan Gwynne, a prominent Cincinnati lawyer and Judge. Her paternal grandfather, Major David Gwynne, was a real estate broker in Cincinnati, whose family was among the early settlers of Cincinnati, and Alice was said to be a distant relative of the Longworth family. She inherited the property at 6th and Main St. and her brother took the corner of 4th and Main St.

The tallest section, the tower, is 14 stories. The Beaux-Arts style building is made of steel and concrete the exterior is rendered in Indiana limestone, brick and granite. Originally the building was considered fireproof as there was "no wood of any description being used," and the floors were finished in polished concrete with the hall floors containing mosaics. The corners of the building are adorned with ox heads.

In addition to the 1913 building, the east building was built in 1916, and the north building was built in 1939.

=== Tenants ===
From 1935 until 1956, the office building housed the headquarters of Procter & Gamble (P&G). The P&G World Headquarters are now located in twin towers a few blocks to the east.

In 1992, the building was purchased by a group of tenants and investors from EQ Office, which was owned by Chicago billionaire real estate investor Sam Zell, founder and chairman of Equity International. The purchase was followed by an about $1,000,000 in renovations.

In July 2014, the building, which was then 88% occupied, was offered for sale. The tenants included Southwest Ohio Regional Transit Authority, Sound Images (later renamed Gwynne Sound), the Charles H. Dater Foundation and the Greater Cincinnati & Northern Kentucky Film Commission. It was purchased by an investment group led by Patrick Gates. In 2024, HGC Construction launched a complete conversion of the historic property into a luxury Pendry Hotel brand; though those plans are no longer on the table, the transformation into a luxury hotel property continued throughout 2025. Franklin, Sydney. "Plans inch forward to convert long-vacant Downtown office buildings to hotels". Cincinnati Enquirer [date=August 9, 2024.
