= Alice Claypoole Vanderbilt =

Vanderbilt family member (1845–1934)

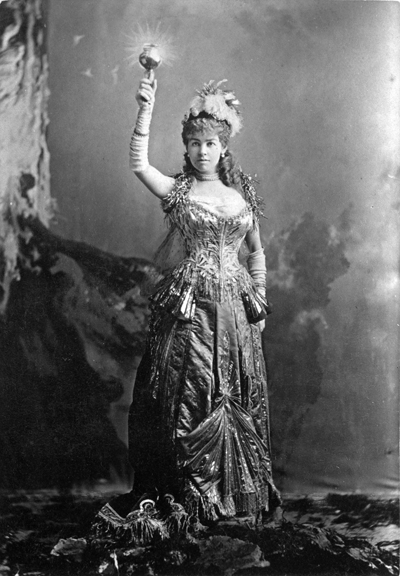
- In costume as "The Electric Light" at a ball on March 26, 1883
- Born: Alice Claypoole Gwynne; November 11, 1845; Cincinnati, Ohio, U.S.
- Died: April 24, 1934 (aged 88); Manhattan, New York City, U.S.
- Spouse: Cornelius Vanderbilt II (m. 1867; died 1899)
- Children: Alice Gwynne Vanderbilt; William Henry Vanderbilt II; Cornelius Vanderbilt III; Gertrude Vanderbilt; Alfred Gwynne Vanderbilt; Reginald Claypoole Vanderbilt; Gladys Moore Vanderbilt
- Parent(s): Abraham Evan Gwynne; Rachel Moore Flagg

Alice Claypoole Vanderbilt (née Gwynne; November 11, 1845 – April 24, 1934) was the wife of Cornelius Vanderbilt II and reigned as the matriarch of the Vanderbilt family for over 60 years.

== Early life and relatives ==
Alice Claypoole Gwynne was born on November 11, 1845, in Cincinnati, Ohio. Alice, who was also raised in Cincinnati, was a daughter of lawyer Abraham Evan Gwynne and Rachel Moore Flagg. After her father's death in 1855, her mother remarried to Albert Mathews, who wrote under the name Paul Siegvolk. Alice's siblings included David Eli Gwynne, Abram Evan Gwynne, Cettie Moore (née Gwynne) Shepherd, and Edith Olivia (née Gwynne) Gill.

She was a granddaughter of Henry Collins Flagg, a former mayor of New Haven, Connecticut, and a great-great-granddaughter of Major Ebenezer Flagg, who served in the 1st Rhode Island Regiment during the American Revolution and was killed during the Battle of Pine's Bridge in 1781. Her maternal uncles were George Whiting Flagg, a painter, and Jared Bradley Flagg, a real estate developer and also a painter. Through Jared Flagg, she was a first cousin of architect Ernest Flagg.

Alice was from an old Rhode Island family and among her ancestors was Roger Williams, who founded the Colony of Rhode Island and Providence Plantations, and Samuel Ward Sr., a former Rhode Island Governor. Many Flagg family members are buried in Newport's Island Cemetery. Alice's affection for Newport reflected this association of her earliest colonial ancestors with the city.

== Marriage and children ==
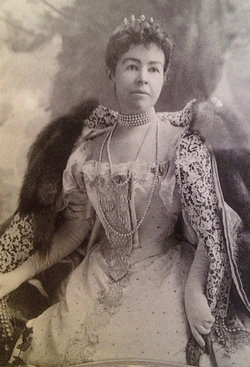
Portrait of Alice Vanderbilt, c. 1895

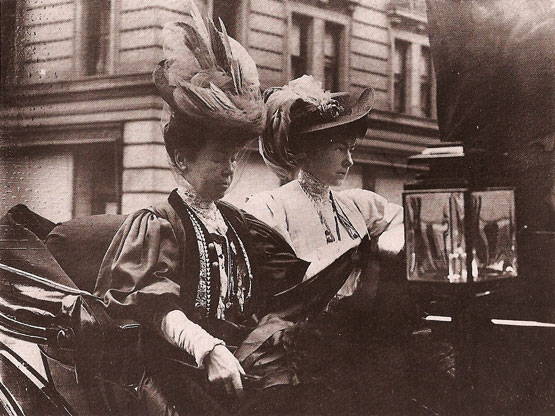
With her daughter Gertrude in 1895

While teaching Sunday school at St. Bartholomew's Episcopal Church in New York City, she met Cornelius Vanderbilt II, the eldest son of William Henry Vanderbilt and Maria Louisa Kissam. They were married on February 4, 1867, at the Church of the Incarnation on Madison Avenue in New York.

Together, they were the parents of four sons and three daughters:

- Alice Gwynne Vanderbilt (1869–1874), who died young.
- William Henry "Bill" Vanderbilt II (1870–1892), who died of typhoid fever while a student at Yale University.
- Cornelius "Neily" Vanderbilt III (1873–1942), who was disinherited for marrying Grace Graham Wilson against his parents' wishes.
- Gertrude Vanderbilt (1875–1942), who married Harry Payne Whitney. She was an artist who founded the Whitney Museum.
- Alfred Gwynne Vanderbilt (1877–1915), a businessman who died aboard the RMS Lusitania.
- Reginald Claypoole Vanderbilt (1880–1925), an avid equestrian.
- Gladys Moore Vanderbilt (1886–1965), who married Count László Széchenyi.

== Later life ==
Alice Vanderbilt's husband died of a cerebral hemorrhage on September 12, 1899, in their New York home at 1 West 57th Street. His estate at the time of his death was appraised at $72,999,867 (equivalent to $2.83 billion in 2025 dollars), $20 million of which was in real estate.

Alice lived another 35 years until her death on April 22, 1934, in her home at 857 Fifth Avenue in Manhattan, where she had moved after the 1926 sale of the 57th Street mansion (which was then demolished).

=== Estate and Trust Litigation ===
The Executors of the Will of Cornelius Vanderbilt II had set aside $7,000,000 from his Estate for the Trust Fund to pay the $250,000 annuity provided for Alice under her husband's Will. By 1928, the trust had accumulated surplus income exceeding that amount, and in 1929 the Surrogate's Court of New York ruled that $2,005,015.39 in surplus income and excess principal should instead be treated as part of her husband's residuary estate. As her late husband's residuary estate had been left to her deceased son Alfred, the Court ordered that the funds be paid to Alfred's Executors; his residuary estate had been left to his two younger sons Alfred and George Vanderbilt.

At her death in 1934, Alice Claypoole Vanderbilt's gross estate was valued at $10,120,907.17, with a net estate of $9,354,587.85 after deductions, including the value of the funds held within the Trust given to her under the terms of Cornelius' Will, valued at $5,935,572.07. Her will provided for a range of bequests to her family:

From the Trust Fund Established in her Husband's Will:

- $150,000 to her daughter Gertrude Vanderbilt Whitney
- $500,000 to split evenly between the children of her late son Alfred Gwynne Vanderbilt:
  - Alfred Gwynne Vanderbilt Jr.
  - William Henry Vanderbilt III
  - George Washington Vanderbilt III
- The remaining balance of the Trust Capital ($5,285,572) to:
  - One-third (approximately $1,762,000) to the children of deceased son Reginald: Cathleen Vanderbilt and Gloria Vanderbilt (approximately $881,000 each)
  - Two-thirds (approximately $3,524,000) to her daughter Gladys Vanderbilt Széchenyi

From her remaining estate, Alice also provided for:

- $100,000 to her widowed daughter-in-law Gloria Morgan Vanderbilt
- $100,000 each to her sons-in-law, Harry Payne Whitney and Count László Széchenyi
- $50,000 to her granddaughter Countess Alice Széchenyi (daughter of Gladys)
- $50,000 to Alice Vanderbilt Morris
- $100,000 to her sister Cettie Gwynne Shepherd
- $50,000 to her niece Maud Gwynne Harran
- $50,000 to the Society of St. Johnland, Long Island (Sunbeam Cottage)
- $80,000 to Newport Hospital for the Cornelius Vanderbilt Pavilion
- $50,000 to St. Bartholomew's Church, New York City
- The Gwynne Building, Cincinnati to her son Cornelius Vanderbilt III
- Her Manhattan Townhouse, 857 Fifth Avenue, and its furnishings to her daughter Gladys Vanderbilt Széchenyi

Her remaining residuary estate was placed in a Trust for the benefit of Cornelius Vanderbilt III for life, then to his issue or, failing that, to her other descendants per stirpes.

The Surrogate's Court excluded $650,000 from the taxable estate, ruling that this portion went to beneficiaries who would have received at least that amount by default under the trust. The remaining $5,285,572.07 — primarily allocated to Gladys and Reginald's children — was deemed taxable. The New York Court of Appeals upheld this interpretation, holding that property distributed under a general power of appointment was taxable as though owned outright.

== Real estate ==
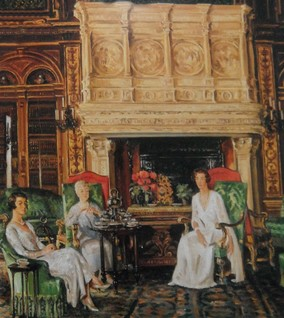
Mrs. Cornelius Vanderbilt II and her daughters, Gladys and Gertrude, having tea in the library at The Breakers in Newport, Rhode Island (William Bruce Ellis Ranken, 1932)

Alice was responsible for constructing several massive family houses, including the enlargement of 1 West 57th Street, making it the largest private residence ever built in an American city at the time. She also played a role in constructing The Breakers in Newport.

In 1914, she was responsible for the construction of the Gwynne Building in Cincinnati, Ohio, site of the first shop of Procter & Gamble and later the company's headquarters. After her death, her son Neily received ownership of the Gwynne Building.

== Philanthropy ==
Alice donated to various charitable causes. Throughout her life, she was a large supporter of the YMCA, Salvation Army, Red Cross, Trinity Church and St. Bartholomew's Church. She and her husband donated Vanderbilt Hall to Yale College in memory of their eldest son, Bill, a student there when he died in 1892. She gave the front gates of her former mansion at 1 West 57th Street to be placed in Central Park. She also donated a facility to Newport Hospital in 1903 in memory of her late husband.

== Descendants ==
Through her son Alfred, Alice was the paternal grandmother of William Henry Vanderbilt III, Alfred Gwynne Vanderbilt Jr., and George Washington Vanderbilt III.

Through her youngest son Reginald, Alice was the paternal grandmother of Cathleen Vanderbilt and Gloria Vanderbilt, the socialite and fashion designer, and a great-grandmother of news anchor Anderson Hays Cooper and Carter Vanderbilt Cooper.

Through her daughter, Gladys, she was the maternal grandmother of Hungarian-American heiress Alice Széchenyi.
