= The Flight of Florimell =

Painting by Washington Allston

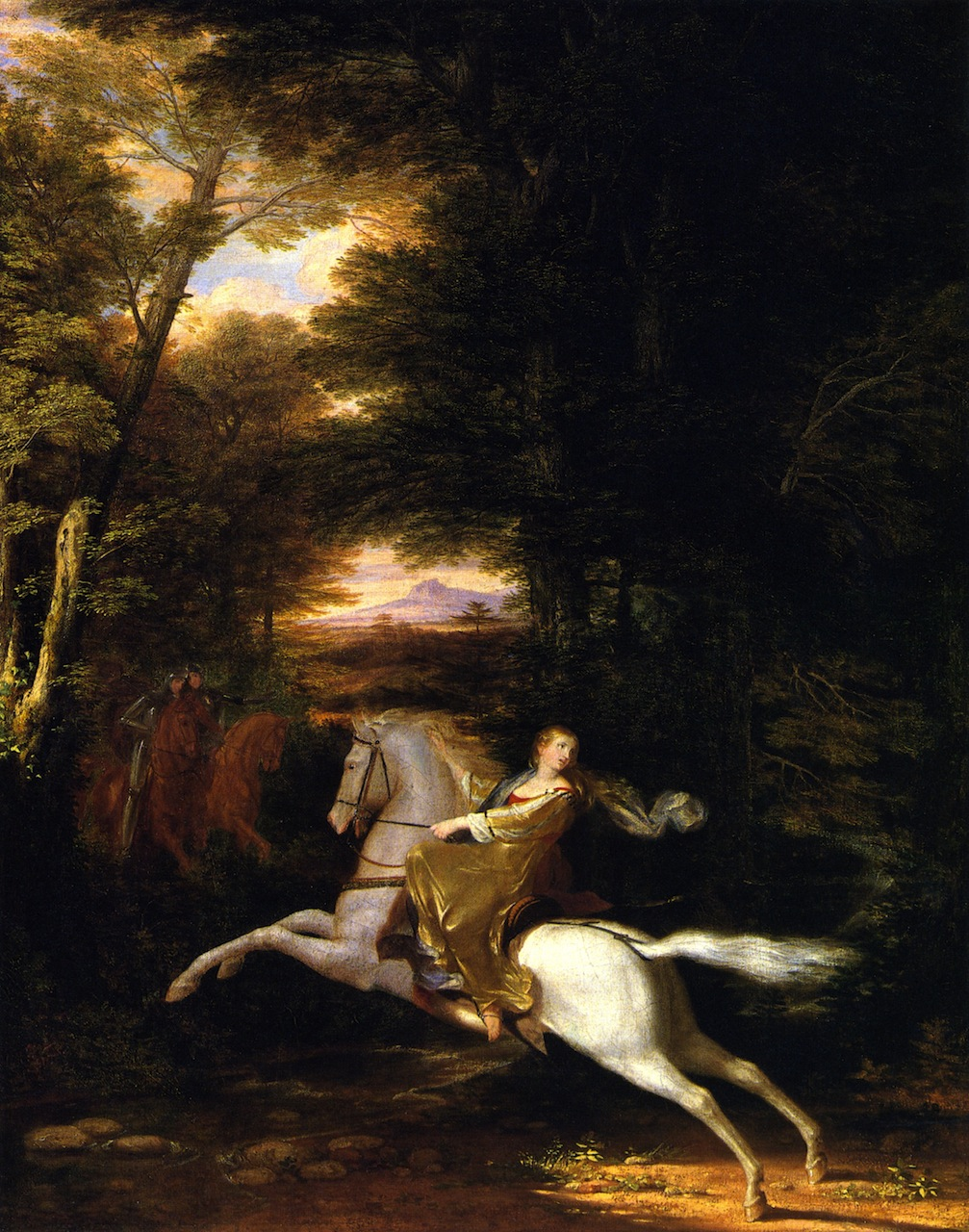
- Artist: Washington Allston
- Year: 1819
- Type: Oil on canvas
- Dimensions: 91.4 cm × 71.1 cm (36.0 in × 28.0 in)
- Location: Detroit Institute of Arts; Michigan

The Flight of Florimell is an 1819 oil painting by the American artist Washington Allston. It depicts a scene from The Faerie Queene by the Elizabethan Era English poet Edmund Spenser. Romantic in style, it is distinctly Gothic in tone with a frightened heroine being pursued on horseback.

Today the painting is in the collection of the Detroit Institute of Arts in Michigan, having been acquired in 1944.

== Bibliography ==
- Carson, Kerry Dean. American Gothic Art and Architecture in the Age of Romantic Literature. University of Wales Press, 2014.
- Palmer, Allison Lee. Historical Dictionary of Romantic Art and Architecture. Rowman & Littlefield, 2019.
- Salmon, Robin B. Brookgreen Gardens. Arcadia, 2006.
