= Paul Siegvolk =

American writer, lawyer and editor

- Born: Albert Mathews; September 8, 1820; New York City, U.S.
- Died: September 9, 1903 (aged 83); Lake Mohonk, New York, U.S.
- Education: Yale University; Harvard Law School
- Occupations: Lawyer, author, editor
- Spouses: Louisa Mott Strong (m. 1849; died 1858) Rachel Moore Flagg (m. 1861; died 1884)
- Relatives: Alice Claypoole Vanderbilt (step-daughter)

Paul Siegvolk (real name Albert Mathews) (September 8, 1820 – September 9, 1903) was an American writer, lawyer and editor. He was also the step-father of Alice Claypoole Vanderbilt.

== Life ==
Mathews was born in New York City on September 8, 1820. He was the son of Oliver Mathews (1794–1881) and Mary (née Field) Mathews (1796–1866). His father's family in the United States originated with Annanias Mathews, his great-grandfather, who came from England in the 17th century. His mother's side was descended from Robert Field, a Quaker who also came from England and settled in Flushing, which was then considered Long Island, in 1645.

He graduated from Yale in 1842, where he was co-editor and contributor to the Yale Literary Magazine. He studied law at Harvard in 1832 and 1843.

== Career ==
Mathews was admitted to the New York Bar in 1845 and practiced law in New York City for forty five years.

He was a contributor to The Knickerbocker from 1852 to 1858. He also wrote for the New York Mirror, Home Journal and Evening Post.

His Walter Ashwood: A Love Story was published in New York in 1859 (duodecimo).

== Personal life ==
In 1848, he first married Louisa Mott Strong (1826–1858). Following her death, he married Rachel Moore Flagg (1822–1884), the daughter of Henry Collins Flagg, the long time mayor of New Haven, Connecticut, and Martha Whiting Flagg, in 1861. Rachel, the widow of Abraham Evan Gwynne, was the mother of Alice Claypoole Gwynne, who married Cornelius Vanderbilt II in 1867. Mathews lived at The Chelsea located at 222 West 23rd Street in New York City and his office was located at 31 Pine Street, also in New York.

Mathews died on September 9, 1903, at Lake Mohonk in New York. He was a member of the Bar Association, University Club, Century Club, Yale Club and Authors Clubs as well as the National Sculptors' Society, National Arts Society, and American Arts Society. On February 27, 1882, he was elected a member of the Saint Nicholas Society of the City of New York.

== Published works ==
- Lines to A.M. The Knickerbocker, March 1852, pp. 263–264
- Schediasms The Knickerbocker, January 1852, pp. 42–45
- Schediasms including The Rights of Children The Knickerbocker, Issue 39, June 1852, pp. 487–490
- Schediasms: The Blithedale Romance The Knickerbocker, November 1852, pp. 381–384
- Sebediasms The Knickerbocker, March 1853, pp. 197–202
- Schediasms The Knickerbocker, May 1854, pp. 503–504
- Schediasms The Knickerbocker, March 1856, pp. 275–278
- Schediasms The Knickerbocker, June 1856, pp. 609–611
- Schediasms The Knickerbocker, July 1856, pp. 68–70
- Schediasms The Knickerbocker, August 1856, pp. 172–174
- Schediasms The Knickerbocker, October 1856, pp. 345–350
- Schediasms The Knickerbocker, November 1856, pp. 495–497
- Schediasms The Knickerbocker, January 1857, pp. 13–17
- Schediasms The Knickerbocker, May 1857, pp. 435–437
- Walter Ashwood: A Love Story (1860)
