= Electric Light dress =

Dress by Charles Frederick Worth

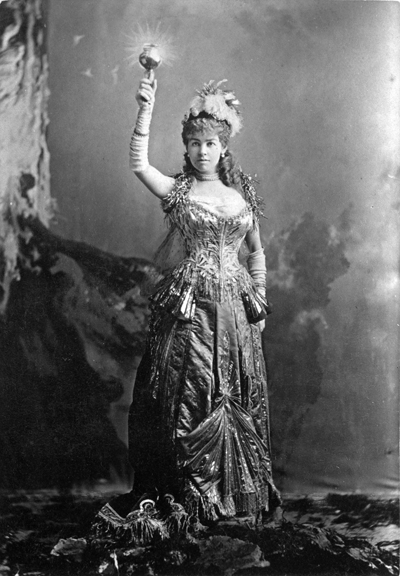
Alice Claypoole Vanderbilt in her Electric Light dress on March 26, 1883

The Electric Light dress was a masquerade gown made of gold and silver thread that was designed by Charles Frederick Worth for Alice Claypoole Vanderbilt. It was made for a masquerade ball that was held in New York City on March 26, 1883. The ball was hosted by Alice Vanderbilt's sister-in-law, Alva Vanderbilt, as a housewarming party for Alva and William K. Vanderbilt's new mansion at 660 Fifth Avenue in Manhattan.

The dress was made of yellow satin, decorated with glass pearls and beads in a lightning-bolt pattern. A built-in battery lit a light bulb she carried, which she could raise over her head like the Statue of Liberty.

This dress was one of several spectacular gowns that served to make the event the official start of Alva Vanderbilt's role as a leading socialite in New York. The dress is preserved at the Museum of the City of New York, having been donated in 1951 by Vanderbilt's youngest daughter Gladys, Countess Gladys Szechenyi.

== See also ==
- List of individual dresses
