= The Spanish Girl in Reverie =

Painting by Washington Allston

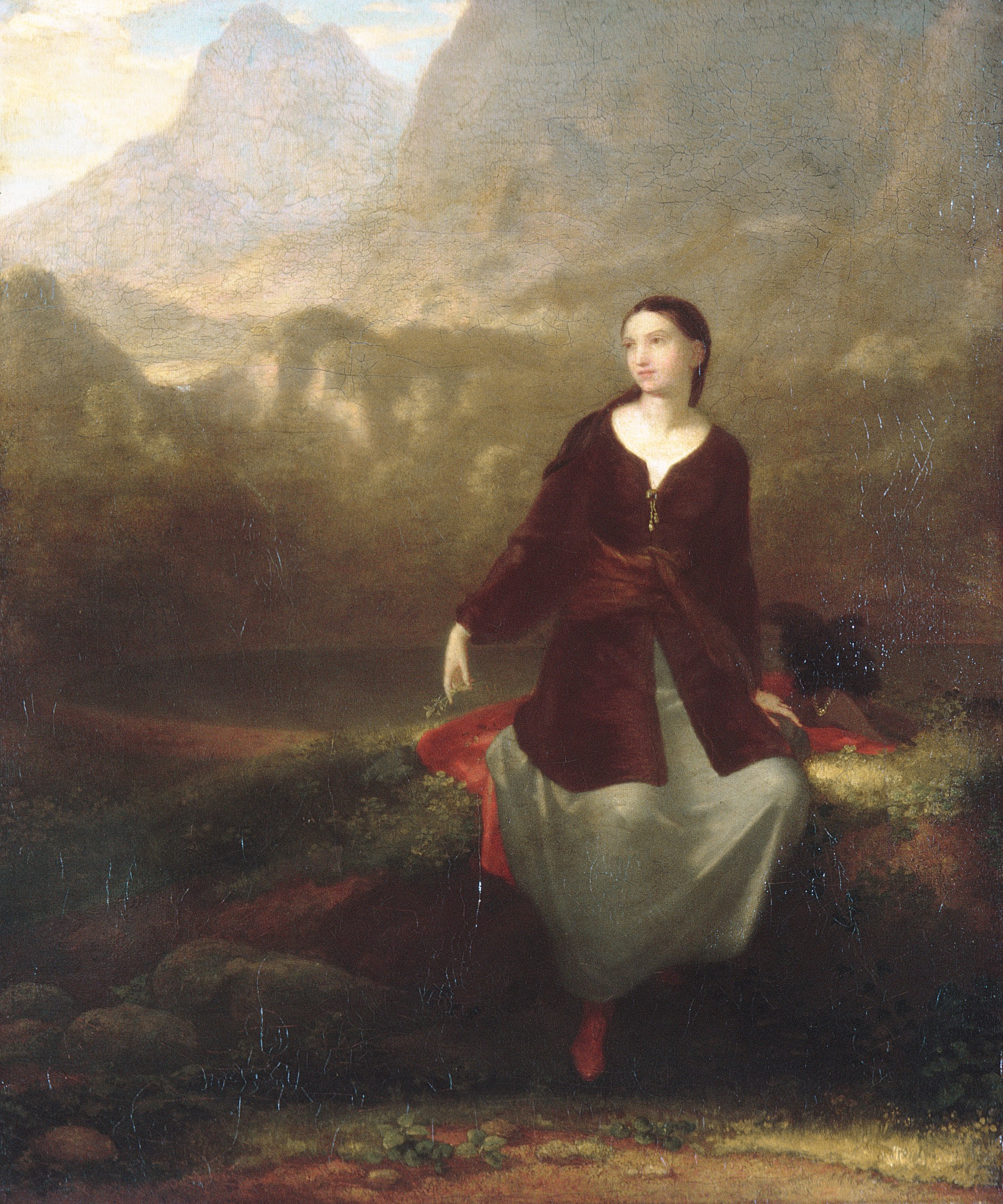
- Artist: Washington Allston
- Year: 1831
- Medium: Oil on canvas
- Dimensions: 76.2 cm × 63.5 cm (30.0 in × 25.0 in)
- Location: Metropolitan Museum of Art

The Spanish Girl in Reverie is a 19th-century oil painting by Washington Allston. Done in oil on canvas, the painting depicts a young Spanish girl waiting the return of her lover from war. The painting is currently in the collection of the Metropolitan Museum of Art.

== Description ==
Washington Allston painted The Spanish Girl in Reverie in 1831 after being inspired by a poem he wrote, titled The Spanish Maid. The painting portrays a young Spanish woman, "Sweet Inez", waiting for her lover Isidore to return from war. Inez is tentatively perched on an earth incline, the spot where she and Isidore were previously betrothed. The nature of her daydreaming is reflected in her face and body language; her emotions range shift between excitement, yearning, hope and fear as she waits for her lover to make an appearance. Though she is the clear focus of the painting, she is dwarfed by the mountains to her back, which add to the gravity of the scene and emulate the sense of distance between the two lovers. Her muted red dress starkly contrasts with the dull (described by the Metropolitan Museum of Art as "diaphanous") colors of the landscape, and the hard lines that make up her outline stand out from the softer lines of the mountains and trees. Allston also paid close attention to the foreground of the painting, where he rendered detailed depictions of soil and plants.
