= George Whiting Flagg =

American painter (1816–1897)

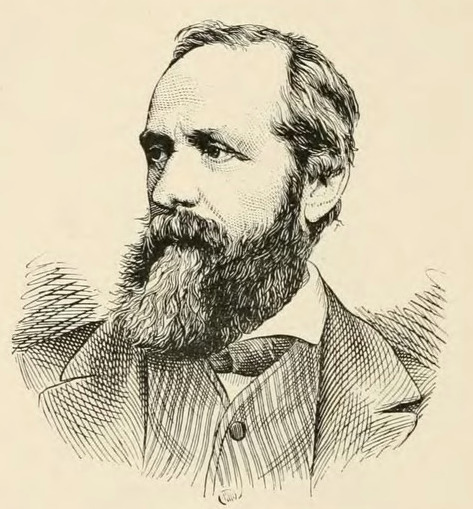
- Born: June 26, 1816; New Haven, Connecticut, U.S.
- Died: January 5, 1897 (aged 80); Nantucket, Massachusetts, U.S.
- Occupation: Painter
- Spouse: Louisa Henriques (after 1849)
- Children: 4
- Parent(s): Henry Collins Flagg; Martha Whiting
- Relatives: Washington Allston (uncle); Jared Bradley Flagg (brother)

George Whiting Flagg (June 26, 1816 – January 5, 1897) was an American painter of historical scenes and genre pictures. He was from a family of artists including his brother, Jared Bradley Flagg, and uncle Washington Allston, with whom both brothers studied.

== Early life ==
Flagg was born on June 26, 1816, in New Haven, Connecticut. He was one of seven children born to New Haven mayor Henry Collins Flagg and Martha (née Whiting) Flagg. Both Flagg brothers studied painting under their uncle, Washington Allston.

Through his sister Rachel and her first husband Abraham, he was the uncle of Alice Claypoole Gwynne, who married Cornelius Vanderbilt II in 1867. Through his brother Jared, he was the uncle of Beaux-Arts architect Ernest Flagg.

== Career ==
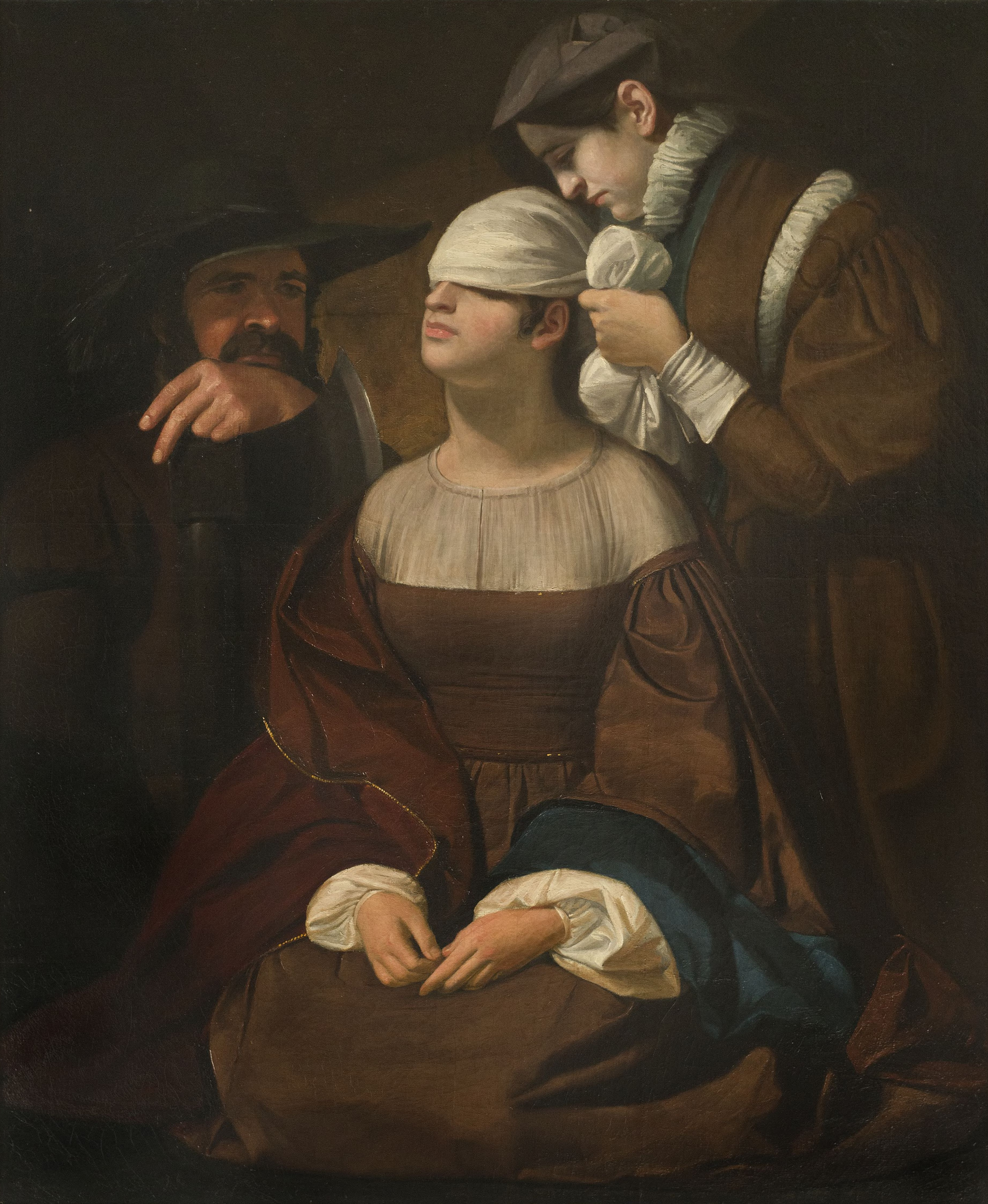
Lady Jane Grey Preparing for Execution (1835) in The Henry Luce II Center for the Study of American Culture, New York

Flagg's early work included Boy Listening to a Ghost Story, A Young Greek, and Jacob and Rachel at the Well.

A painting entitled the Murder of the Princes, from Richard Ill, procured Flagg the patronage of Luman Reed, a merchant and businessman from New York City, through whose aid he spent three years studying in Europe, and afterward lived for six years in London.

Another of Flagg's early paintings, Lady Jane Grey Preparing for Execution, was to make him famous. His fame quickly waned, however, as historical painting became progressively less fashionable.

Among his best-known works should be mentioned Landing of the Pilgrims; Landing of the Atlantic Cable; Washington Receiving his Mother's Blessing, which has been frequently engraved; The Good Samaritan; and Columbus and the Egg (1867). Flagg's The Match Girl, Haidee, and The Scarlet Letter were painted while he was living in London.

In 1851, Flagg was elected to be a member of the National Academy of Design.

=== Later life ===
Later in life, Flagg studied theology and entered the ministry, but eventually he returned to painting, mainly portraiture, during his declining years.

Flagg lived his later years at his home located at 12 Westminster Street, on the island of Nantucket in Massachusetts, until his death in 1897. He painted in a small studio next to this home. Above the fireplace in the upstairs bedroom, Flagg kept his work known as "He That Maketh Haste To Be Rich Shall Not Be Innocent".

== Personal life ==
On February 14, 1849, Flagg was married to Louisa Henriques. Together they were the parents of four children, including:

- George Allston Flagg (1849–1942), who married Thirza Mahalia Kisby (1853–1930).
- Emanuel Henriques Flagg (1855–1936), who married Ella Martha Beegle (1858–1931) in 1885.

Flagg died on January 5, 1897, in Nantucket, Massachusetts.
