= Yale Literary Magazine =

American literary magazine

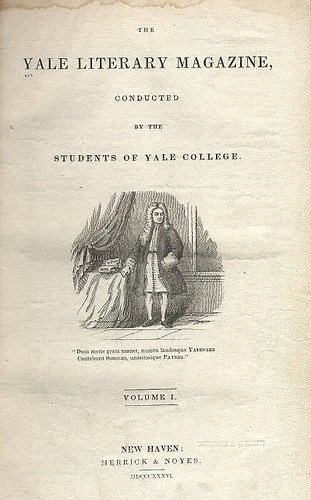
- Categories: Literary magazine
- Frequency: Biannual
- Publisher: Yale University
- First issue: 1836
- Country: United States
- Language: English
- Website: yalelit.com
- ISSN: 0196-965X

The Yale Literary Magazine, founded in 1836, is a student literary magazine that publishes poetry, fiction, and visual art by Yale undergraduates twice per academic year. Notable alumni featured in the magazine while students include Susan Choi, Sinclair Lewis, Meghan O'Rourke, ZZ Packer, Max Ritvo, Sarah Sze, and Thornton Wilder.

In 2026-2027, the magazine's editors-in-chief are Noah Curtis Lee and Smile Jiang.

Along with The Columbia Review, the magazine claims to be the oldest student literary magazine in the United States. This contention is based on differing interpretations of publication continuity - Columbia Review traces its origins back to the now-defunct Literary Monthly, which published its first issue in 1815.

In 1936, the magazine published a centennial issue featuring several alumni authors, including Stephen Vincent Benét, William Lyon Phelps, and Gifford Pinchot. In 1978, the then-bankrupt magazine was purchased by alumnus Andrei Navrozov, but it was returned to student control in 1985 after Yale University won a lawsuit and ordered Navrozov to cease using the Yale name.

The magazine publishes one issue per semester, and awards the annual Francis Bergen Memorial prize to a student author. The spring 2020 issue was released online to accommodate the results of the coronavirus pandemic. In recent years, the magazine has conducted and published interviews with high-profile twentieth and twenty-first-century literary figures such as Junot Diaz, who won the Pulitzer Prize for Fiction, Art Spiegelman, who won a Pulitzer Prize for his graphic novel memoir Maus, and Paul Muldoon, the poetry editor for The New Yorker, who won a Pulitzer Prize for Poetry.

== Editors ==
- Stephen Vincent Benét, circa 1820
- Albert Mathews (better known as Paul Siogvolk), circa 1842
- Homer Sprague, circa 1848
