= Washington Allston =

American artist (1779–1843)

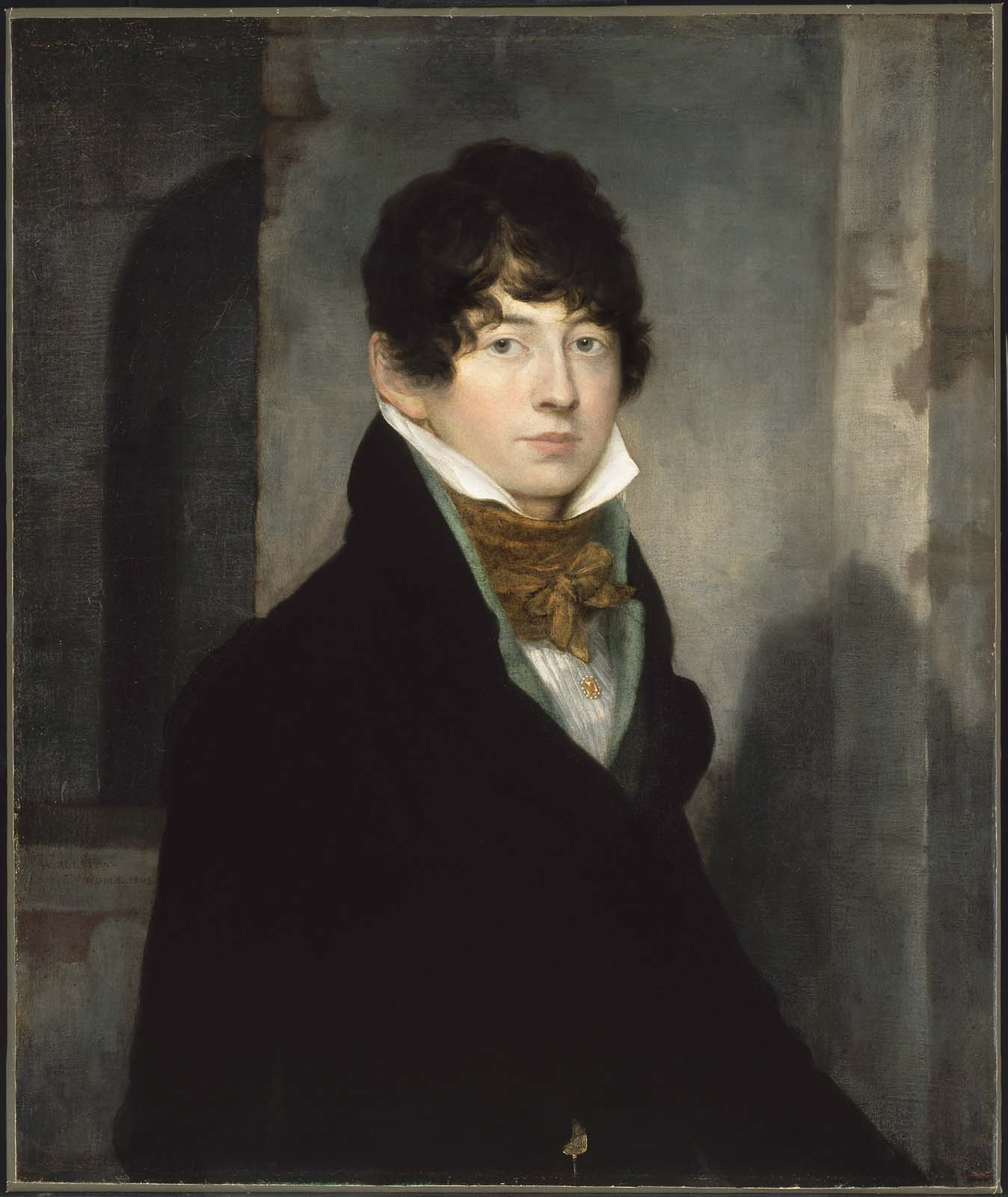
- Self-portrait, 1805 Museum of Fine Arts, Boston
- Born: November 5, 1779; Near Georgetown, South Carolina, U.S.
- Died: July 9, 1843 (aged 63); Cambridge, Massachusetts, U.S.
- Known for: Painting; Poetry
- Spouses: Ann Channing (1809–15); Margaret Remington Dana (1830-43)

Washington Allston ARA (November 5, 1779 – July 9, 1843) was an American painter and poet, born in Waccamaw Parish, South Carolina. Allston pioneered America's Romantic movement of landscape painting. He was well known during his lifetime for his experiments with dramatic subject matter and his bold use of light and atmospheric color. While his early artworks concentrate on grandiose and spectacular aspects of nature, his later pieces represent a more subjective and visionary approach.

== Biography ==
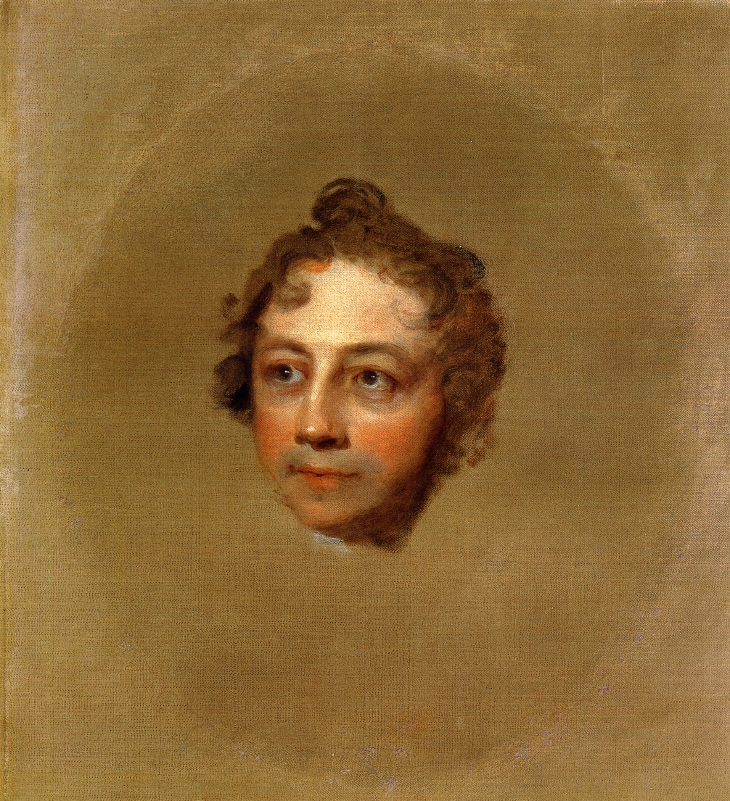
Allston painted by Gilbert Stuart, c. 1818. Metropolitan Museum of Art, New York

Allston was born on a rice plantation on the Waccamaw River near Georgetown, South Carolina. His mother Rachel Moore had married Captain William Allston in 1775, though her husband died in 1781, shortly after the Battle of Cowpens. Moore remarried to Dr. Henry C. Flagg, the son of a wealthy shipping merchant from Newport, Rhode Island.

Named in honor of the leading American general of the Revolution, Washington Allston graduated from Harvard College in 1800 and moved to Charleston, South Carolina, for a short time before sailing to England in May 1801. He was admitted to the Royal Academy Schools in London in September, when painter Benjamin West was then the president.

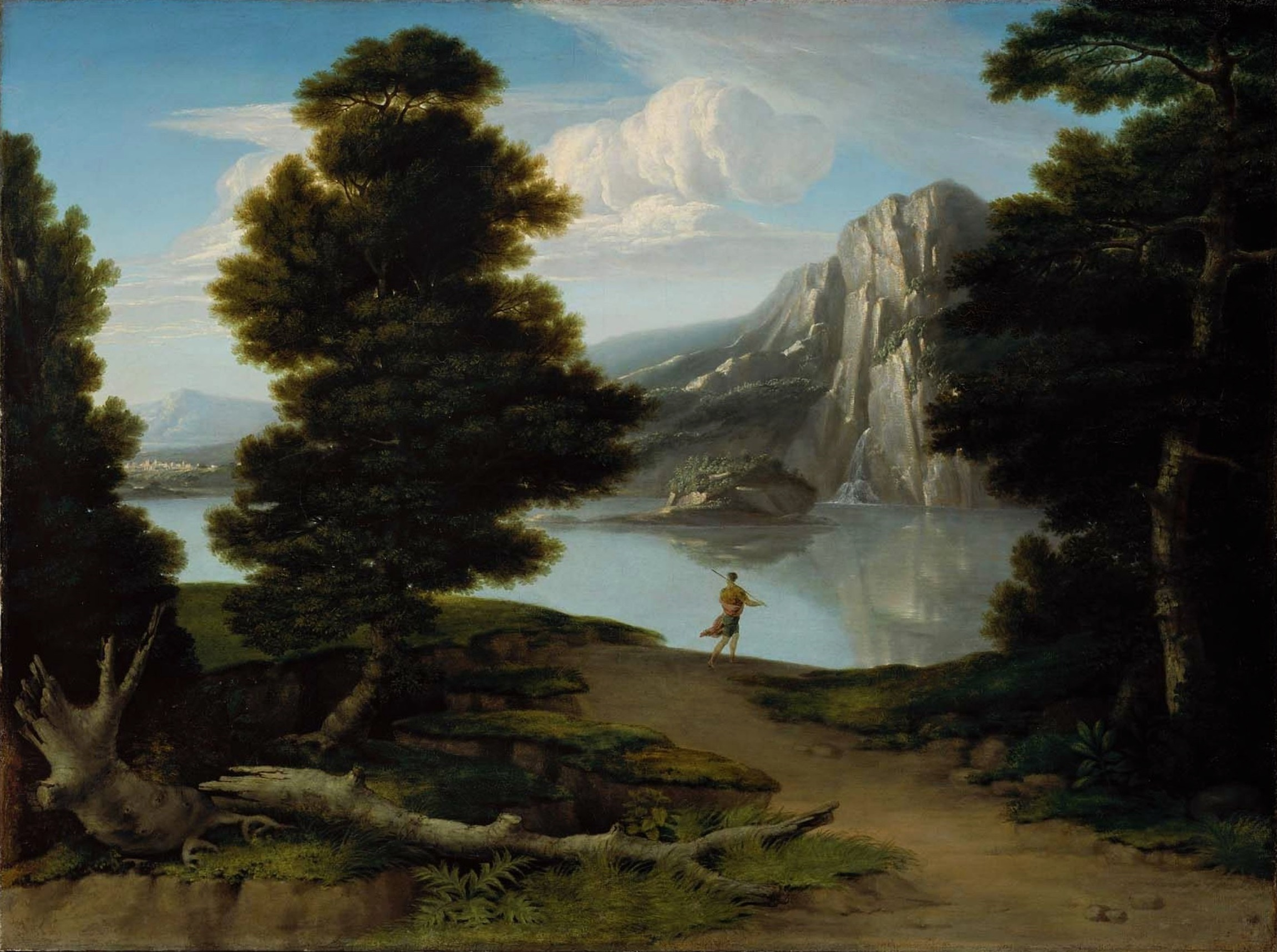
Landscape with Lake (1804)

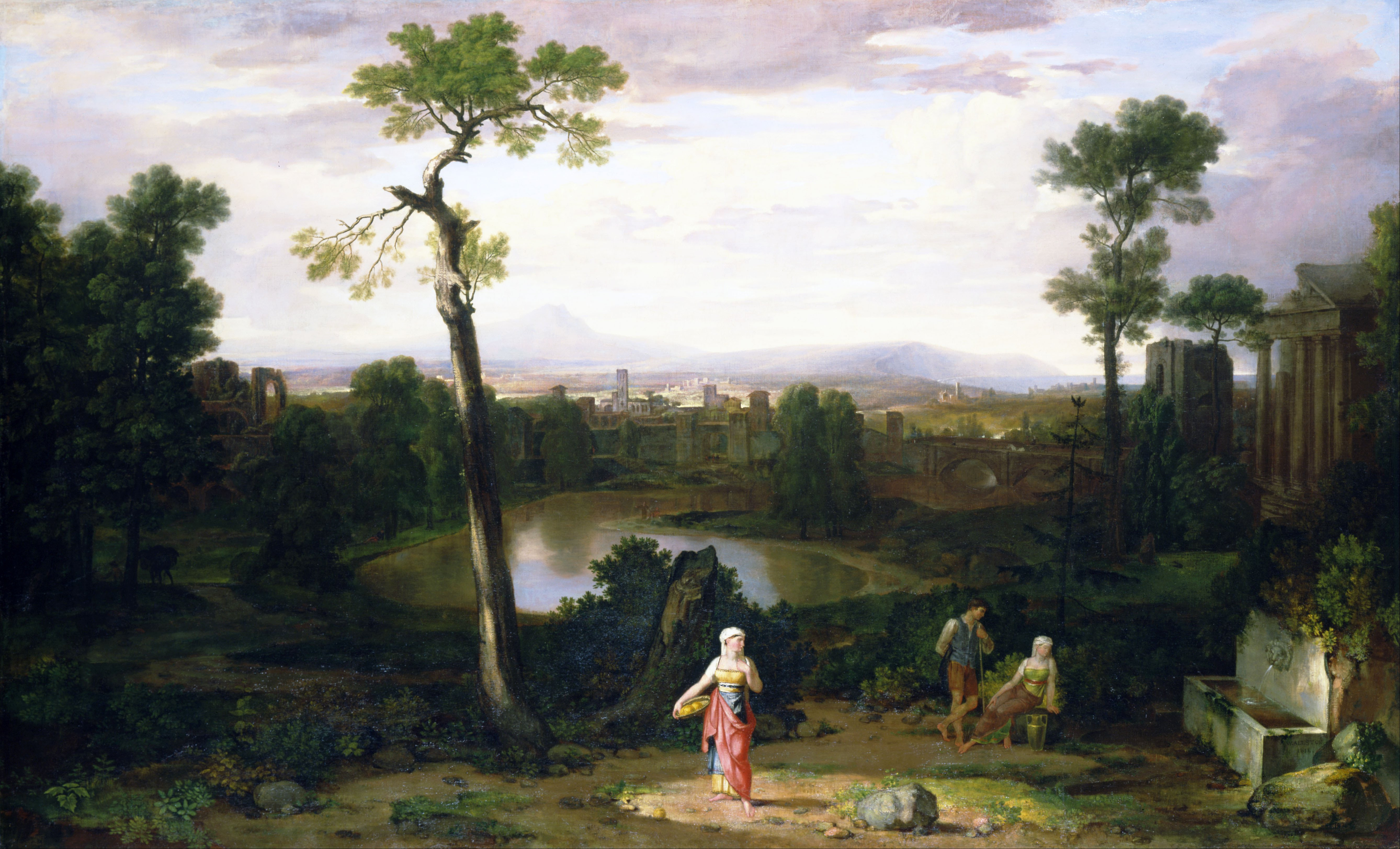
Italian Landscape

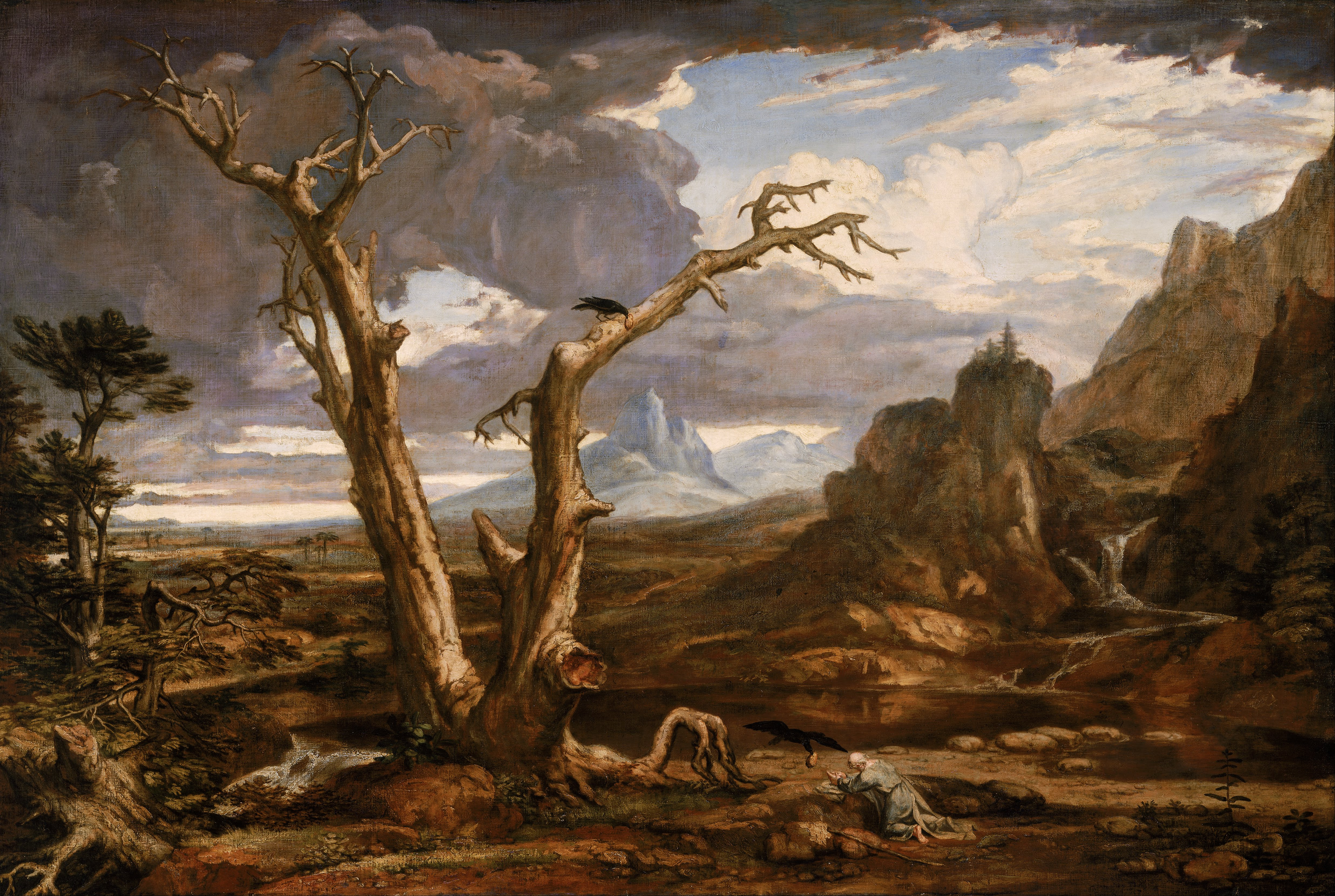
Elijah in the Desert, 1818, Museum of Fine Arts, Boston

From 1803 to 1808, he visited the great museums of Paris and then, for several years, those of Italy, where he met Washington Irving in Rome and Coleridge, his lifelong friend. In 1809, Allston married Ann Channing, sister of William Ellery Channing. Samuel F. B. Morse was one of Allston's art pupils and accompanied Allston to Europe in 1811. After traveling throughout western Europe, Allston finally settled in London, where he won fame and prizes for his pictures.

Allston was also a published writer. In London in 1813, he published The Sylphs of the Seasons, with Other Poems, republished in Boston, Massachusetts, later that year. His wife died in February 1815, leaving him saddened, lonely, and homesick for America.

In 1818, he returned to the United States and lived in Cambridge, Massachusetts, for twenty-five years. He was elected a Fellow of the American Academy of Arts and Sciences in 1826. He was the uncle of the artists George Whiting Flagg and Jared Bradley Flagg, both of whom studied painting under him.

The first American exhibition of Allston's work was in 1827 when twelve of his paintings were shown at the Boston Athenæum. Allston also exhibited five paintings at the National Academy of Design, but this number is low given his place in the artistic community of the time. Four of his paintings were engraved and published in The Atlantic Souvenir and The Token annual gift books in the 1820s and 30s. Among them were Moonlight and The Mother and Child, the latter being considered by Allston to be one of his best works.

In 1830 Allston married Martha Remington Dana (daughter of Chief Justice Francis Dana), the sister of the novelist Richard Henry Dana Sr.; Dana was a cousin of Allston's first wife.

In 1841, he published Monaldi, a romance illustrating Italian life, and in 1850, a volume of his Lectures on Art, and Poems. He worked for years on what he envisioned would be his masterpiece: a painting called Belshazzar's Feast; he died before finishing it.

Allston died on July 9, 1843, at age 63. Allston is buried in Harvard Square, in the Old Burying Ground between the First Parish Church and Christ Church.

== Recognition ==
Allston was sometimes called the "American Titian" because his style resembled the great Venetian Renaissance artists in their display of dramatic color contrasts. His work greatly influenced the development of U.S. landscape painting. Also, the themes of many of his paintings were drawn from literature, especially Biblical stories.

His artistic genius was much admired by Samuel Taylor Coleridge, and Ralph Waldo Emerson was strongly influenced by his paintings and poems, but so were both Margaret Fuller and Sophia Peabody, wife of Nathaniel Hawthorne. The influential critic and editor Rufus Wilmot Griswold dedicated his famous anthology The Poets and Poetry of America to Allston in 1842. Poet Henry Wadsworth Longfellow, 17 years after Allston's death, wrote that: "One man may sweeten a whole time. I never pass through Cambridge Port without thinking of Allston. His memory is the quince in the drawer and perfumes the atmosphere."

Boston painter William Morris Hunt was an admirer of Allston's work, and in 1866 founded the Allston Club in Boston, and in his arts classes passed on to his students his knowledge of Allston's techniques. Contemporary critic James Miller of the same city held him in high regard, saying, "He labors in the highest walks of art." Another contemporary critic, John Neal of The Yankee, felt Allston had unrealized talent: "Mr. Allston's faculties are a very uncommon union of the bold and beautiful", and yet he lacks "that sort of inward fervor which flashes into spontaneous combustion, whenever it is excited or exasperated." Historian David S. Lovejoy nevertheless judged Allston "doubtless the finest American romantic painter".

The Oxford English Dictionary cites Allston as the first to use the term Objective Correlative in 1850. The term, subsequently made famous by T.S Eliot in essay on Hamlet (1919), denotes a set of objects, a situation, a chain of events which shall be the formula of a particular emotion; such that when the external facts, which must terminate in sensory experience, are given, the emotion is immediately evoked.

The west Boston, Massachusetts neighborhood of Allston is named after him, as is Allston Way, in the "Poets Corner" neighborhood of Berkeley, California.

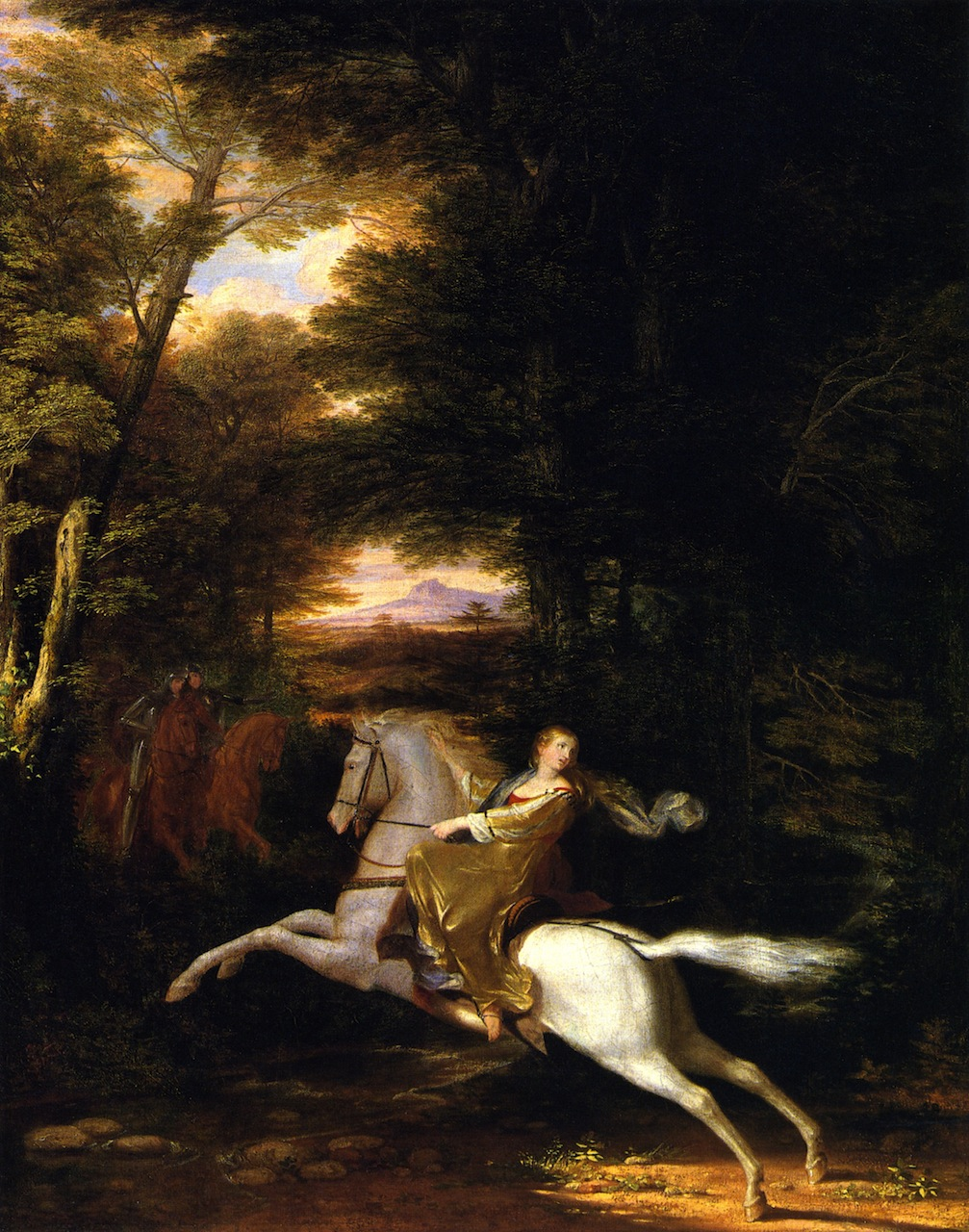
The Flight of Florimell, 1819

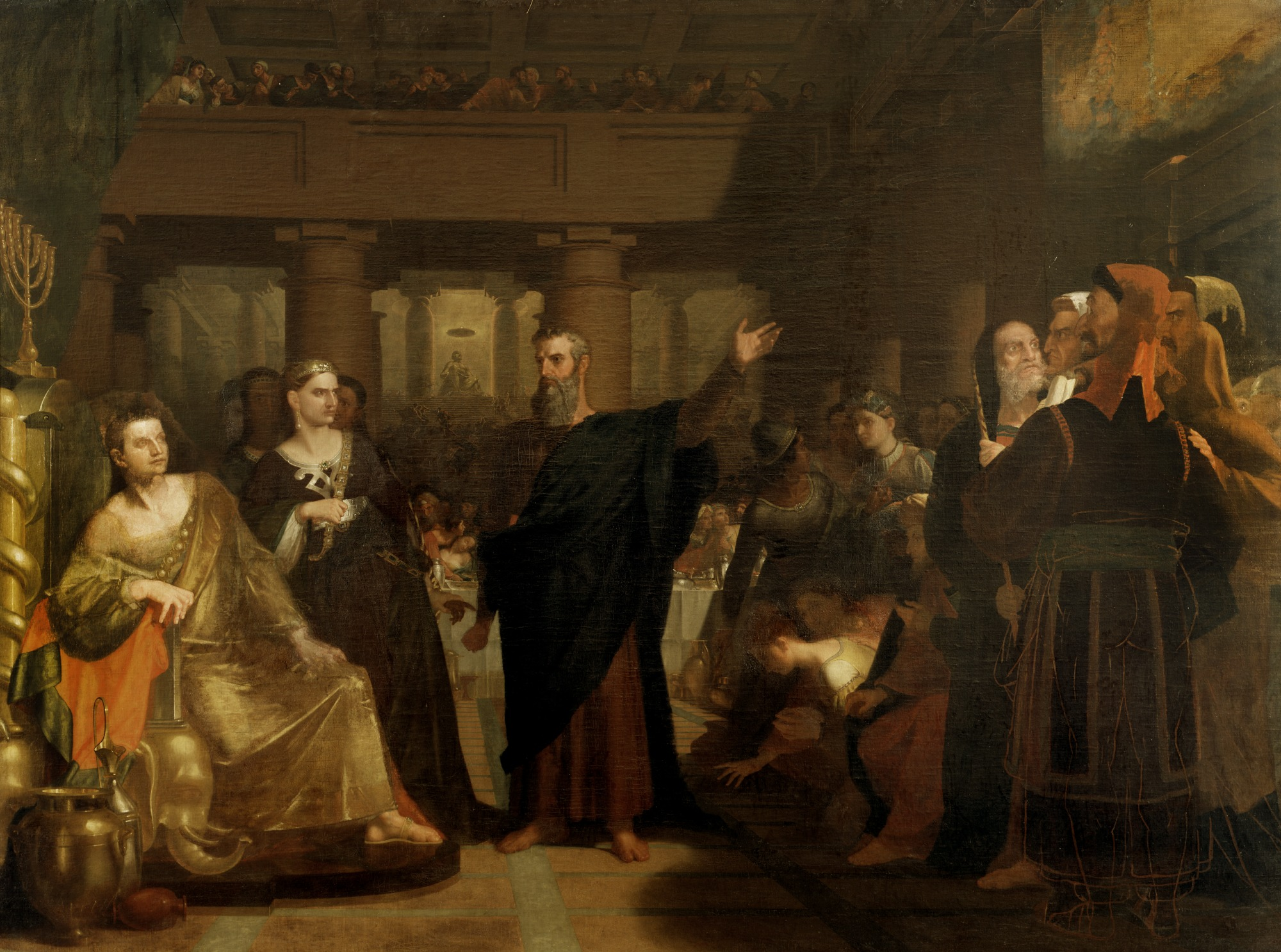
Belshazzar's Feast, 1817–1843, Detroit Institute of Arts

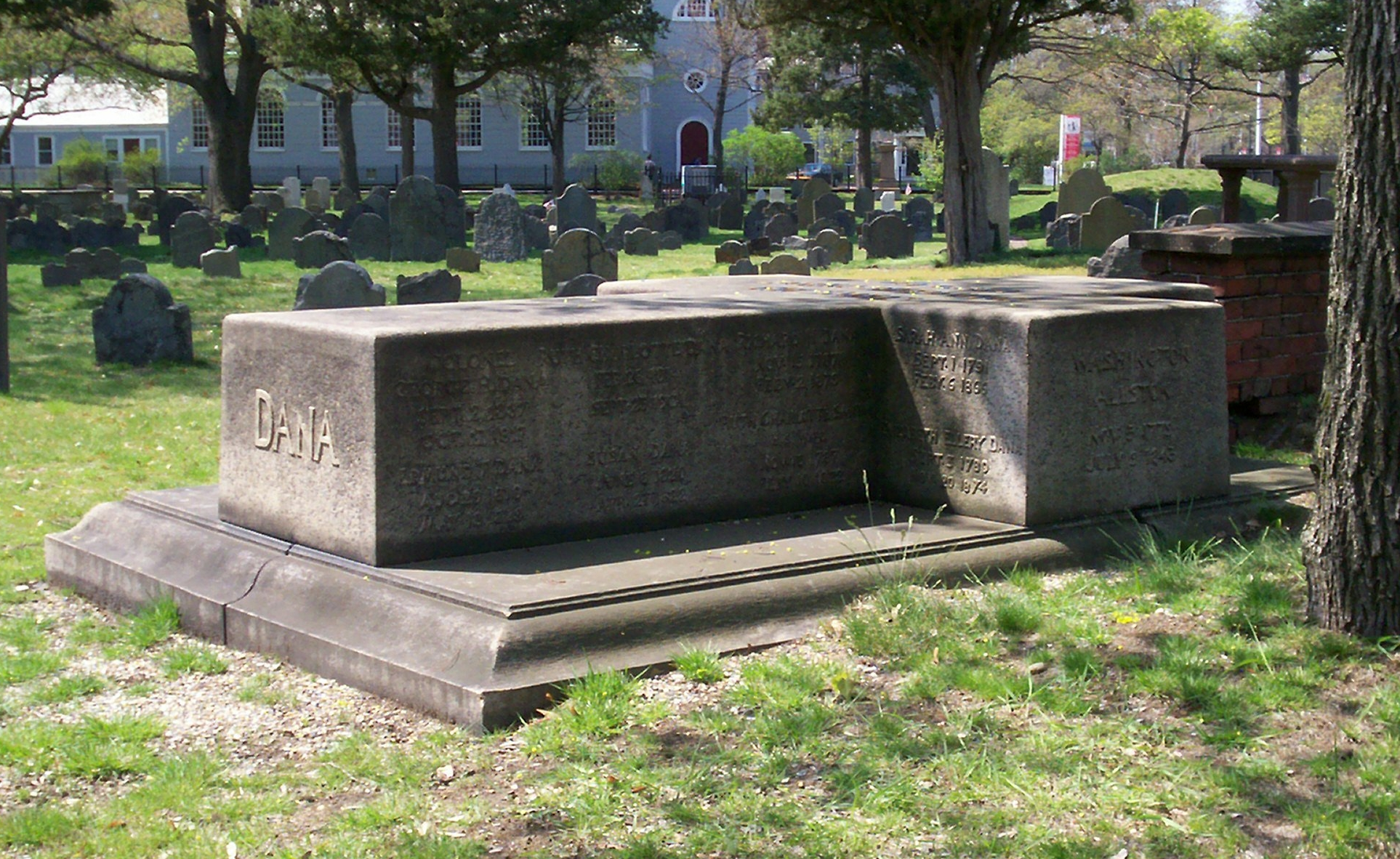
Allston was buried in the Dana family plot in the Old Burying Ground.

== Gallery ==
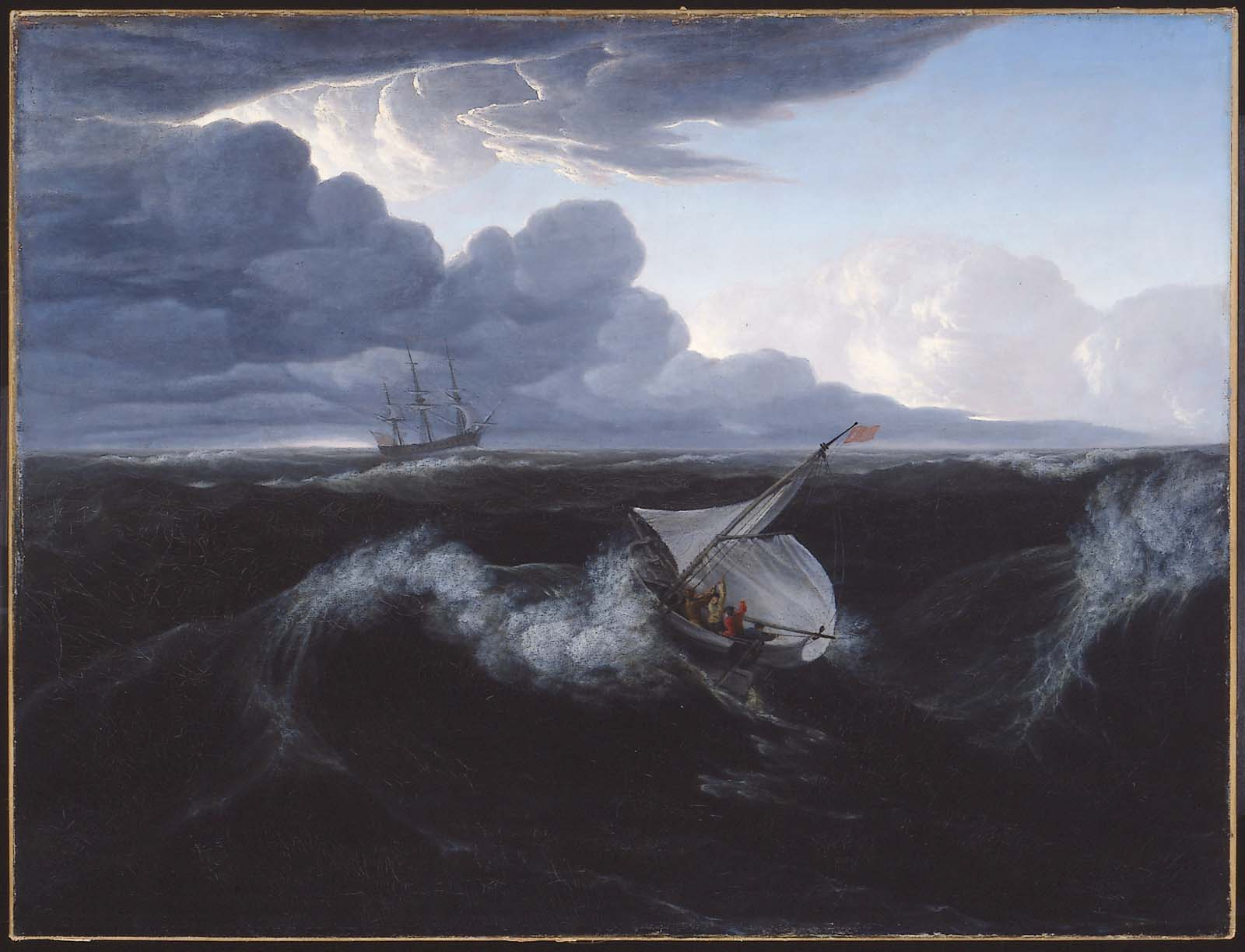
Storm Rising at Sea, 1804, Museum of Fine Arts, Boston, Massachusetts

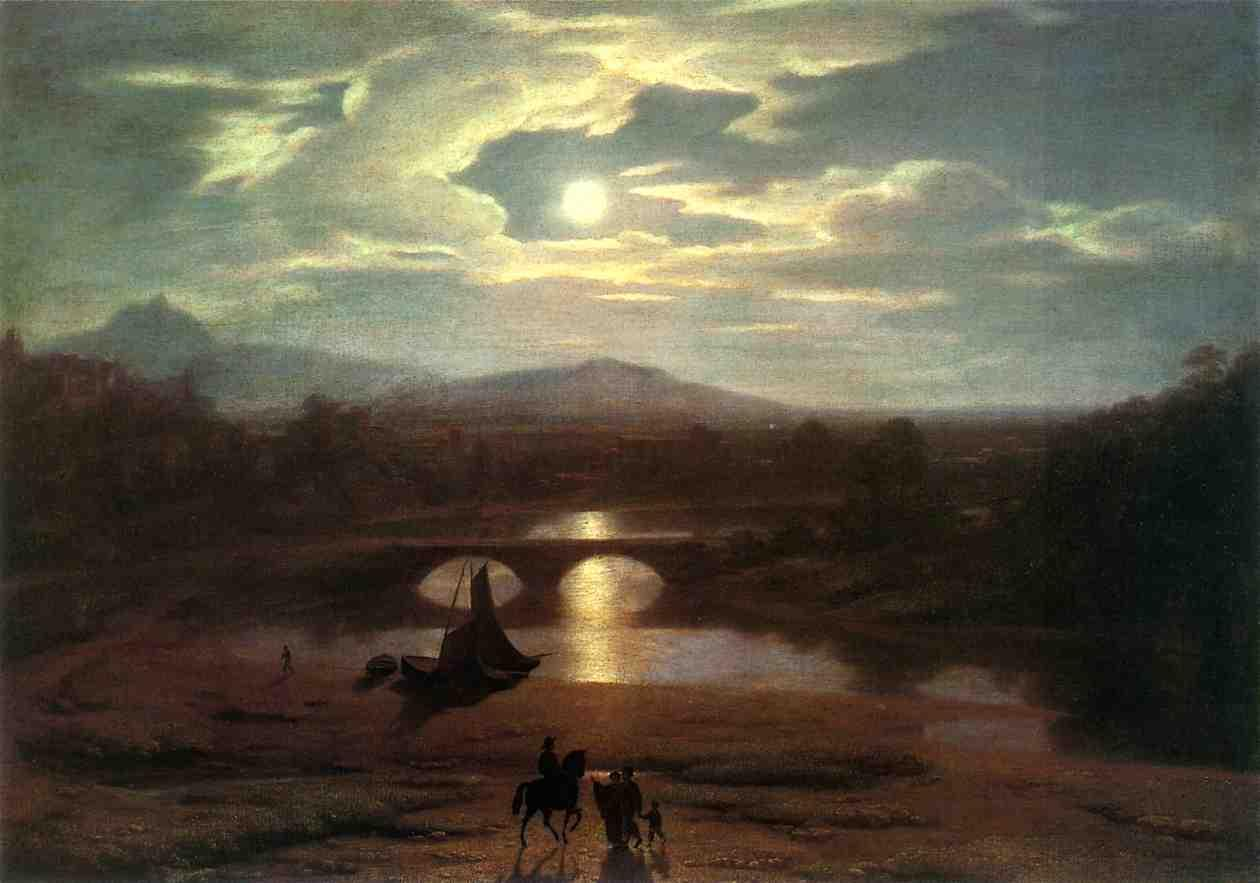
Moonlit Landscape, 1809, Museum of Fine Arts, Boston, Massachusetts

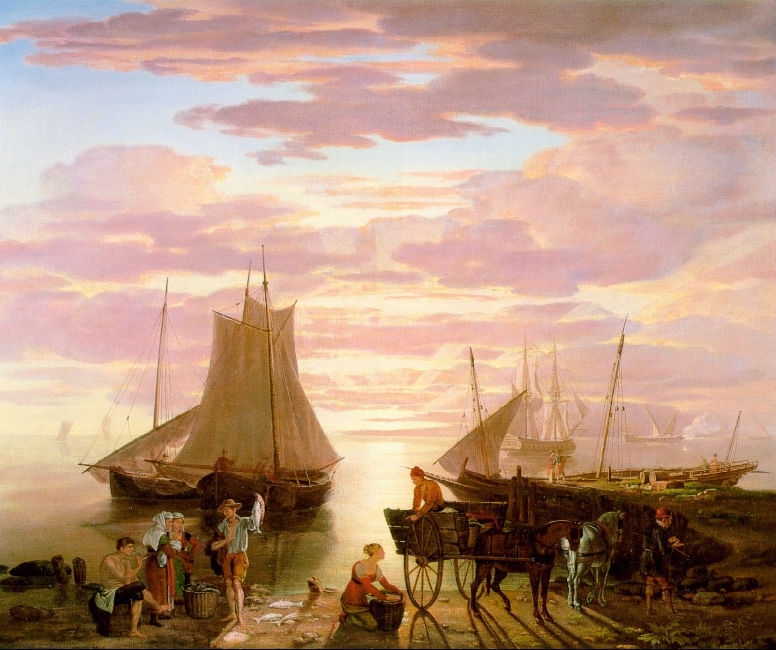
Coast Scene on the Mediterranean, 1811, Columbia Museum of Art, Columbia, South Carolina

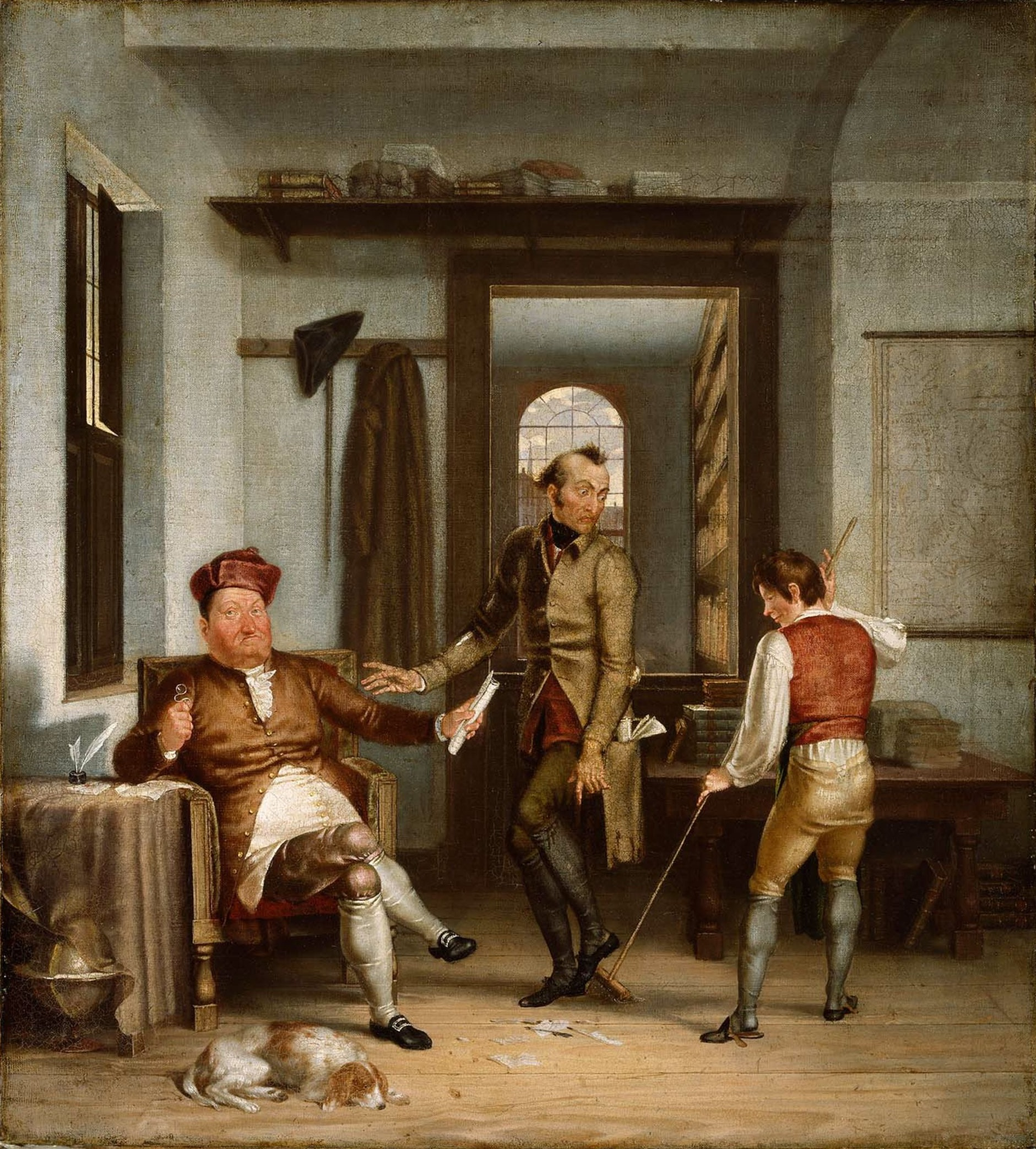
The Poor Author and the Rich Bookseller, 1811

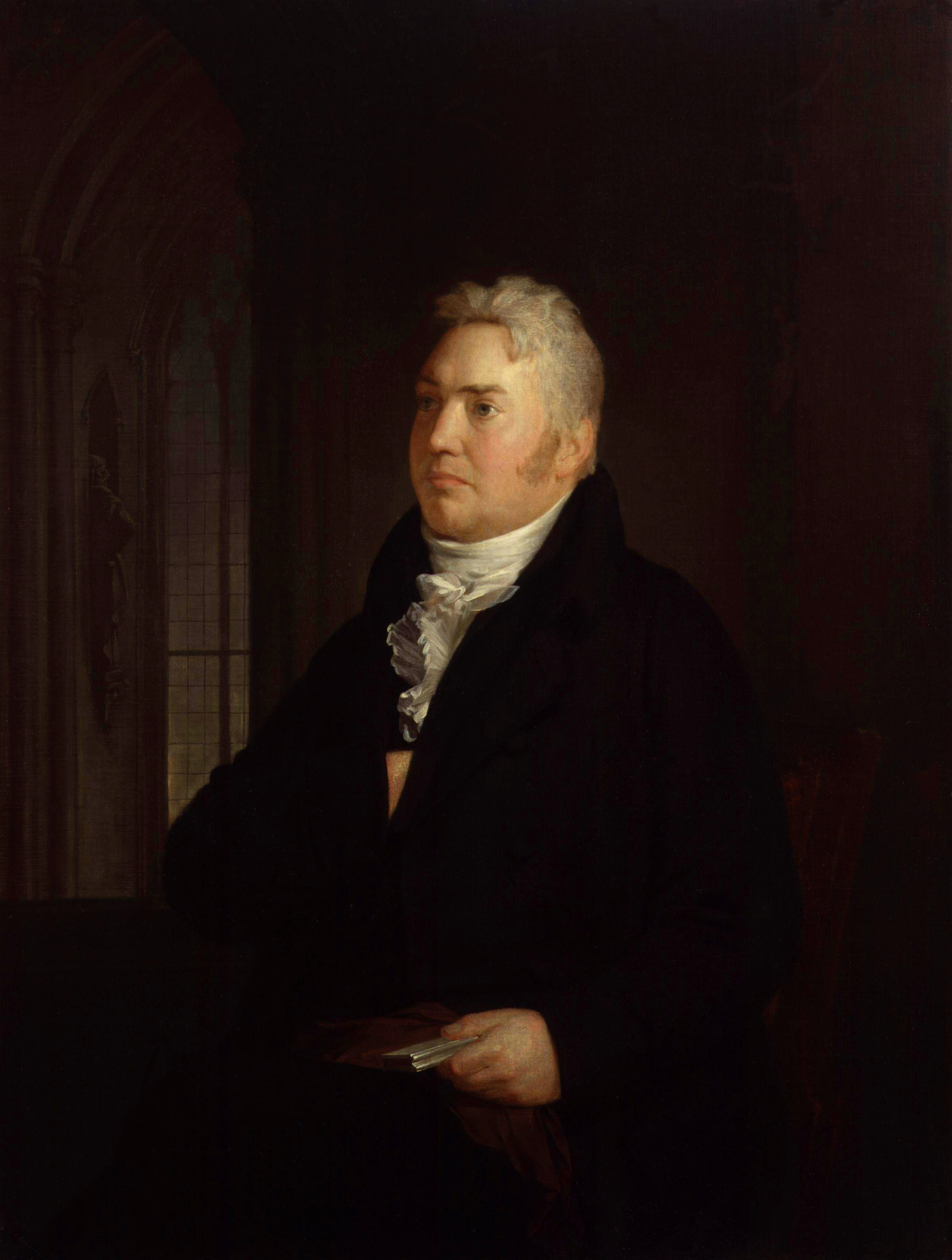
Samuel Taylor Coleridge, 1814, Dove Cottage, Wordsworth Museum, Grasmere, England

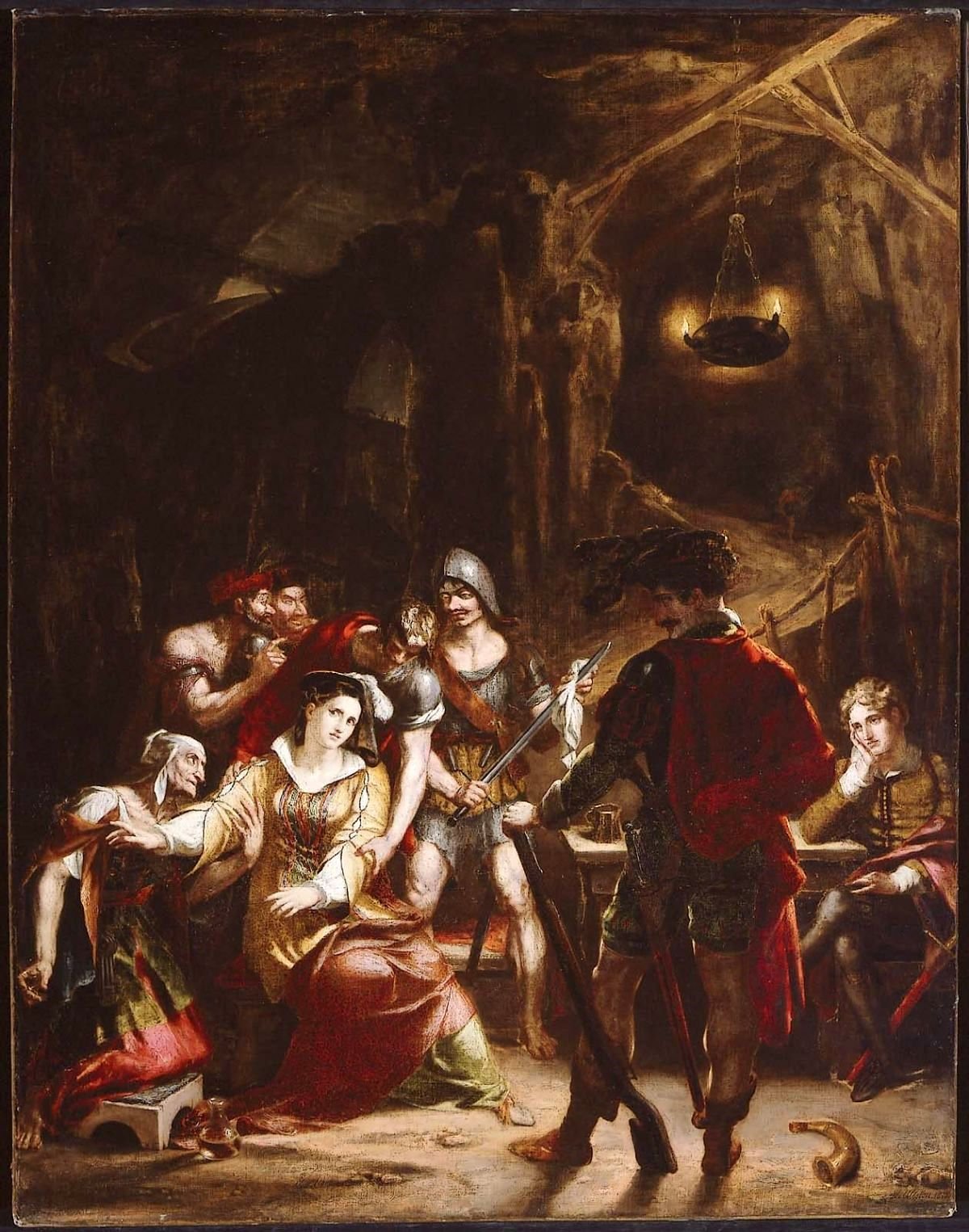
Donna Mencia in the Robber's Cavern, 1815

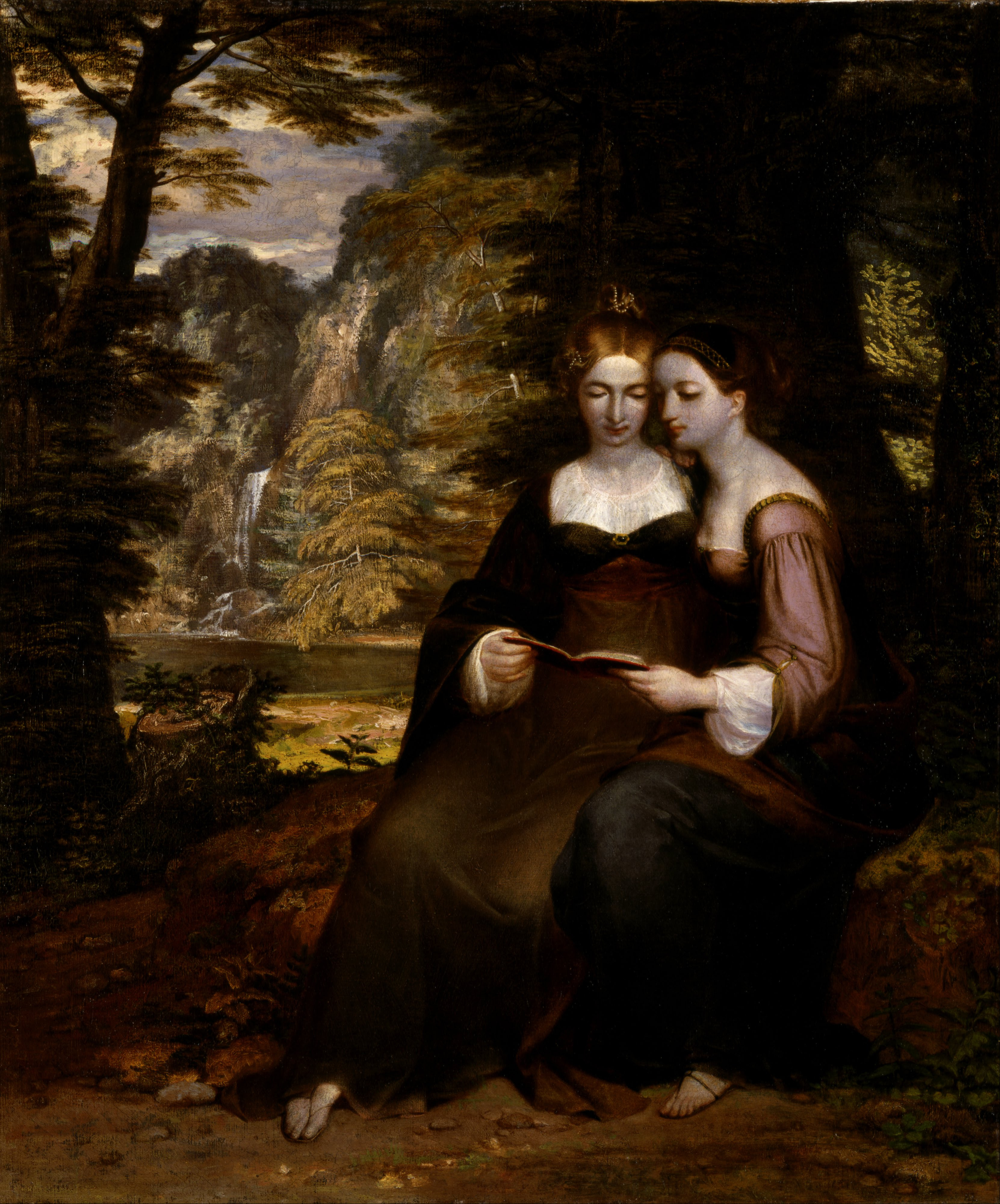
Hermia and Helena, (from A Midsummer Night's Dream) from c. 1818

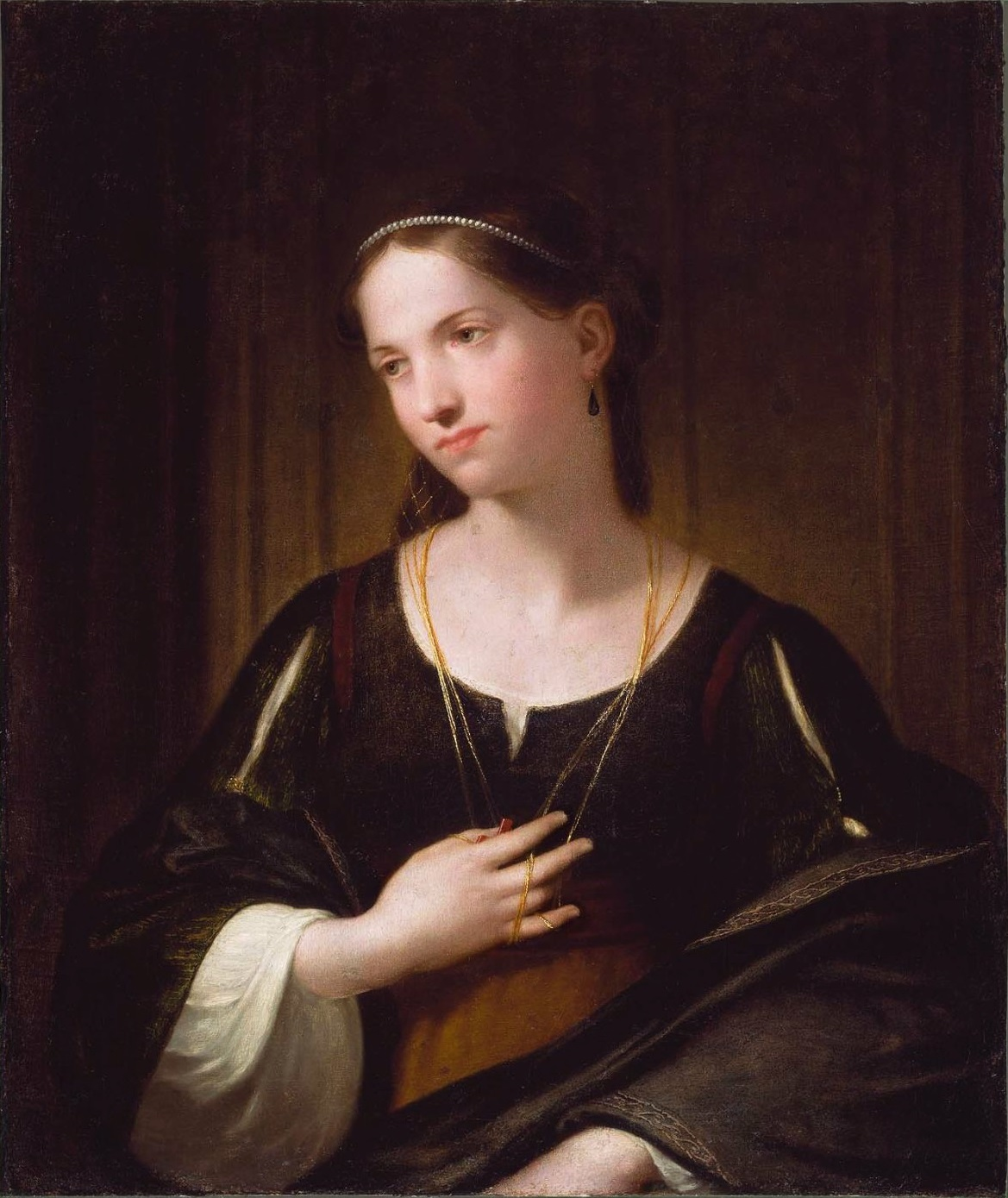
Beatrice, 1819, Museum of Fine Arts, Boston

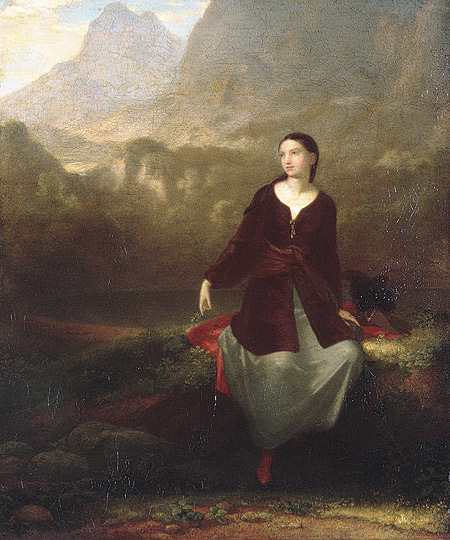
The Spanish Girl in Reverie, 1831

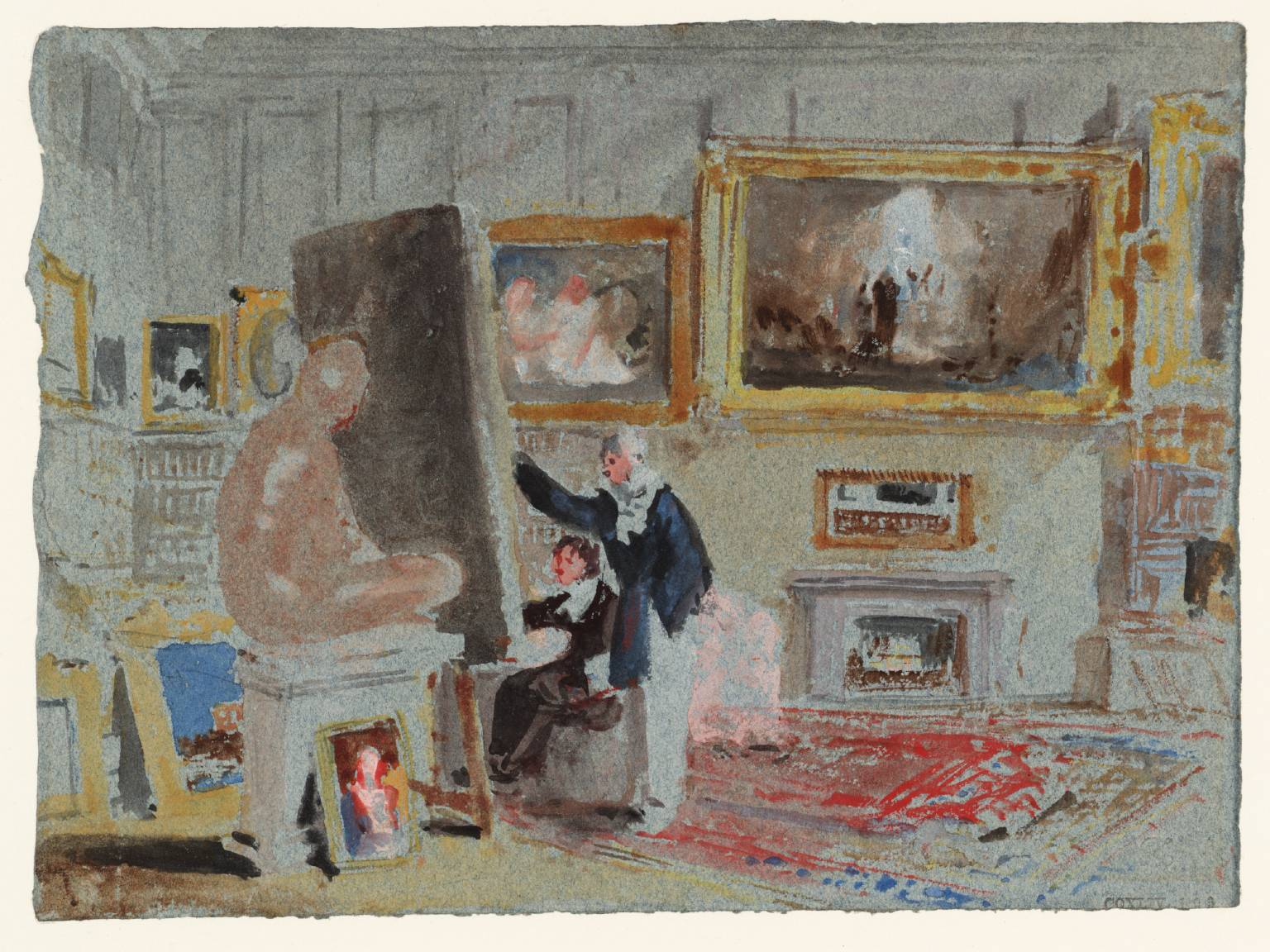
Two Artists in the Old Library, Washington Allston's Picture, 'Jacob's Dream', Hanging over the Fireplace ('The Artist and the Amateur'), J. M. W. Turner, 1827

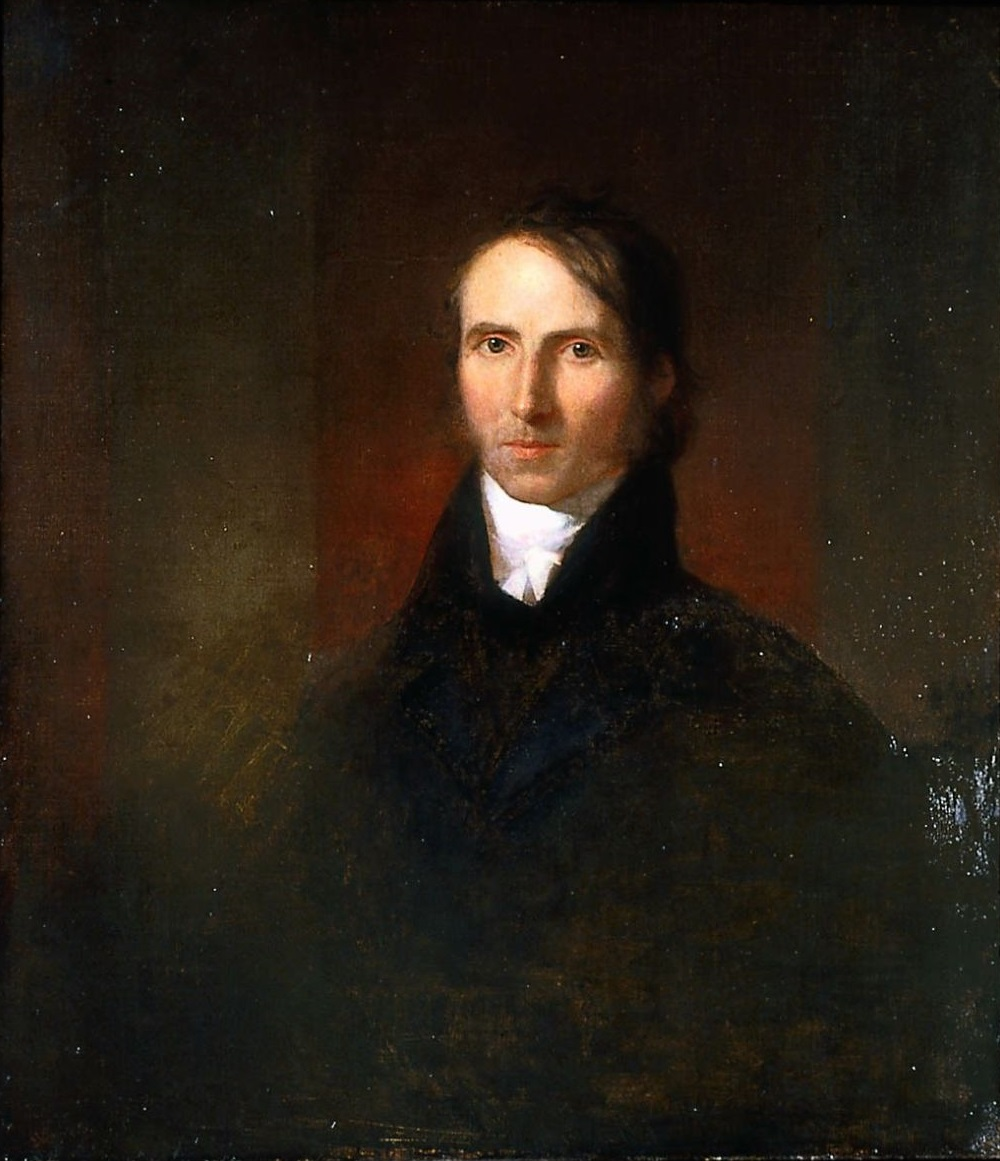
Portrait of William Ellery Channing

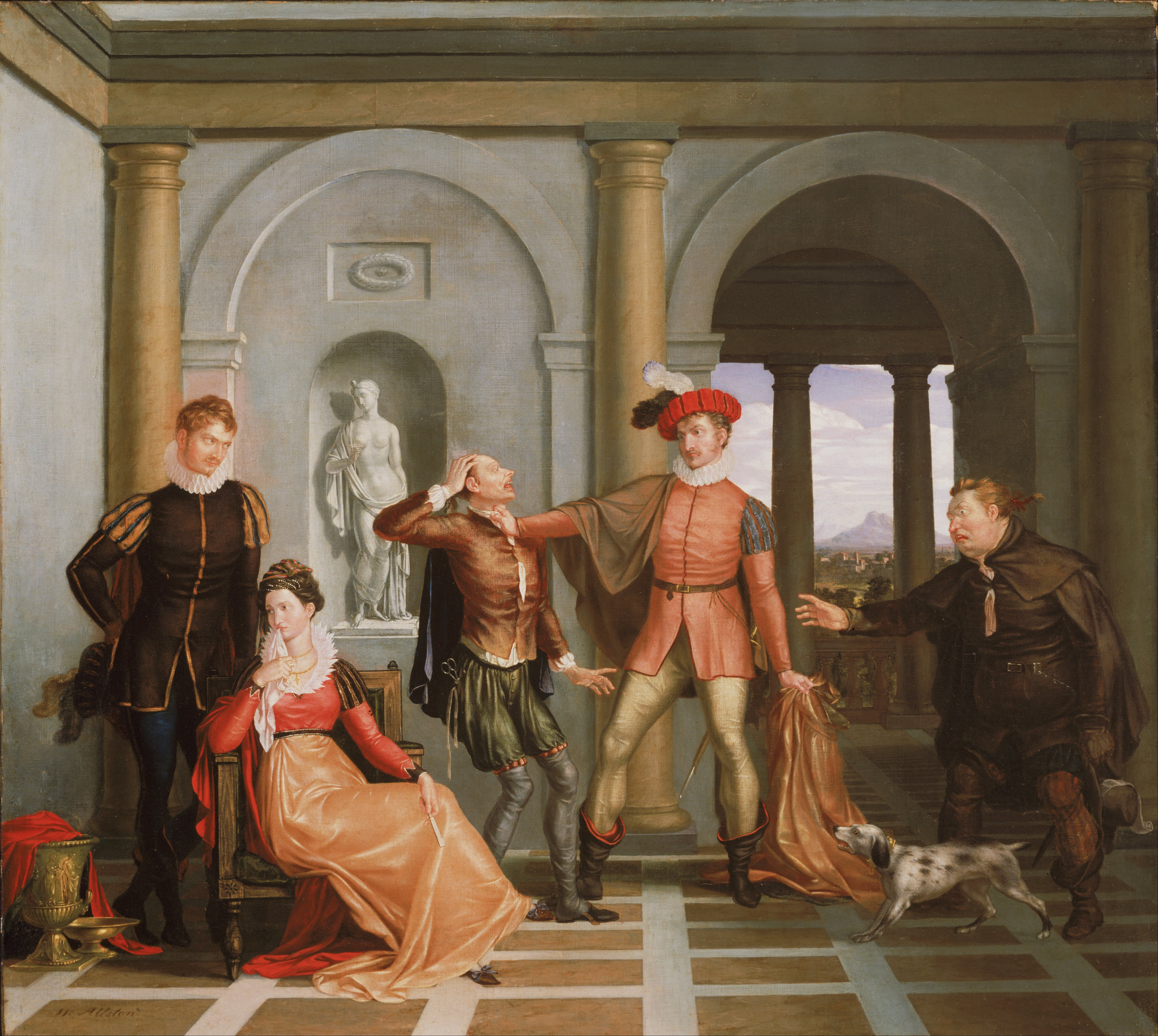
Scene from Shakespeare's "The Taming of the Shrew" (Katharina and Petruchio)

== Additional works ==
External videos
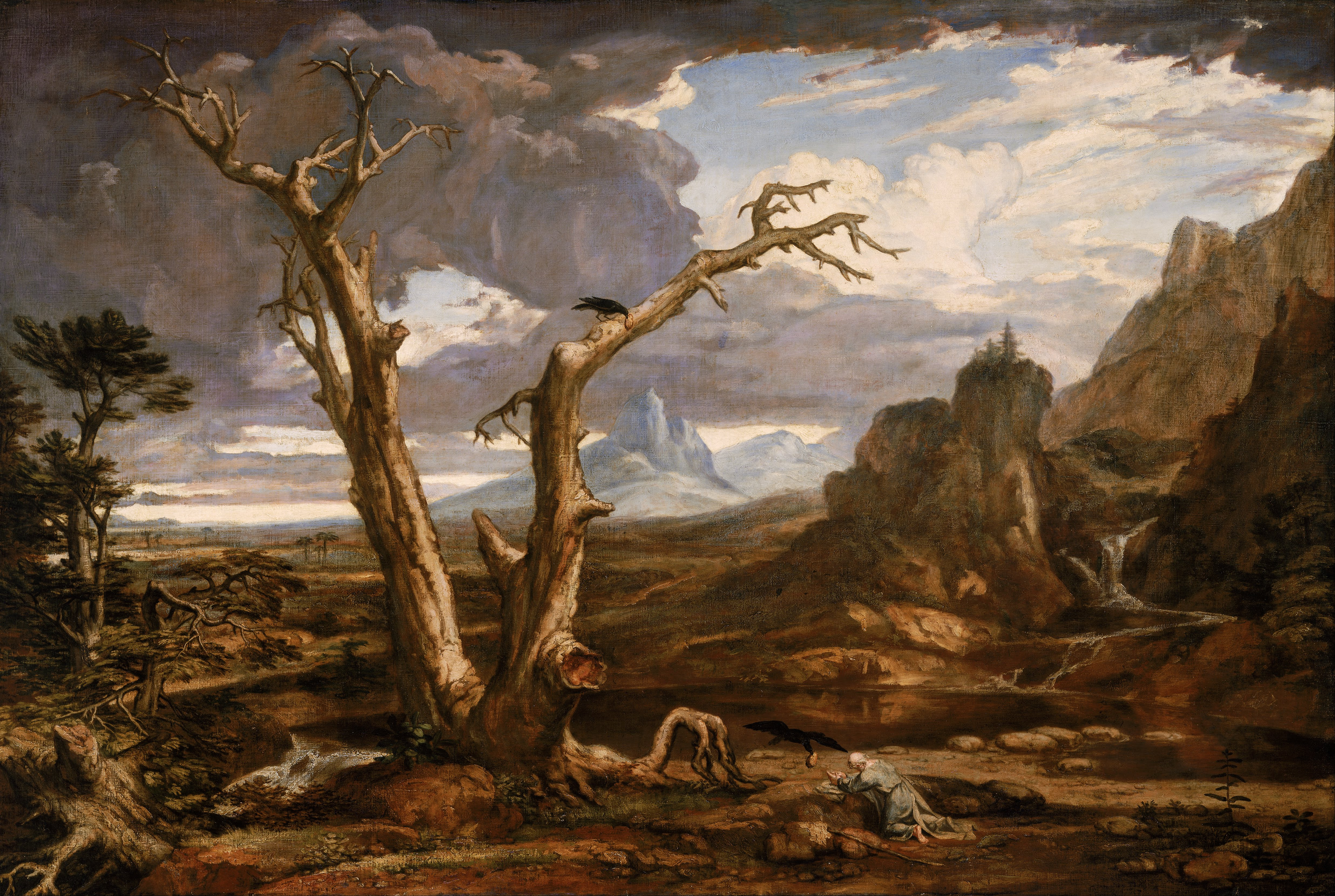
- Allston's Elijah in the Desert, Smarthistory

- A Landscape after Sunset, c. 1819, Corcoran Gallery of Art, Washington, D.C.

== Sources ==
- Corcoran Gallery of Art, Washington, DC
