= Jared Bradley Flagg =

American painter (1820–1899)

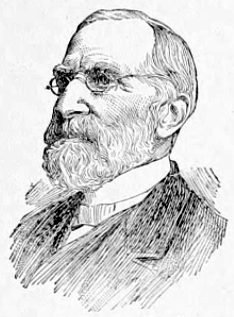
- Born: June 16, 1820; New Haven, Connecticut, U.S.
- Died: September 25, 1899 (aged 79); New York City, U.S.
- Education: Trinity College; Columbia University
- Occupations: Minister, painter
- Spouses: Sarah Montague (m. 1841; died 1844) Amelia Louisa Hart (m. 1846; died 1867) Josephine Bond (after 1869)
- Children: 7, including Ernest Flagg
- Parent(s): Henry Collins Flagg; Martha Whiting Flagg
- Relatives: George Whiting Flagg (brother); Washington Allston (uncle)

Jared Bradley Flagg (June 16, 1820 – September 25, 1899) was an American painter.

== Early life ==
Flagg was born on June 16, 1820, in New Haven, Connecticut. He was a son of Martha (née Whiting) Flagg (1792–1875) and Henry Collins Flagg, the one time mayor of New Haven. He was the younger brother of artists George Whiting Flagg and Henry Collins Flagg III.

The Flagg brothers all studied painting under their famous uncle, Washington Allston, and received some recognition of their own. In 1836, when he was only sixteen years old, Jared exhibited a portrait of his father in the National Academy and was favorably noticed by the critics.

== Career ==
As a young man, Flagg settled in Hartford, Connecticut. He moved to New York in 1849 and was soon elected an academician. Jared pursued the study of theology at intervals with his art, and, in 1854, he entered the ministry of the Protestant Episcopal Church. Flagg received the degree of A.M. from Trinity College in 1861, and that of S.T.D. from Columbia University in 1863.

Flagg served as an Episcopal minister for a decade, including as Rector of Grace Church Brooklyn Heights, until he resumed the practice of his art. He occasionally painted ideal figure pictures but made portraits his specialty. Among Flagg's more notable portraits are of several of the judges of the New York Court of Appeals, including a three-quarter length of Chief Justice Sanford E. Church (which was placed in the new state capitol); Rhode Island Governor Daniel Russell Brown (which was placed in the Rhode Island State House); an 1887 life-size full-length portrait of William M. Evarts (which also hung in the capitol; and several portraits of Commodore Vanderbilt (one of which hangs in the directors' room at the Grand Central depot in New York); and William H. Vanderbilt, among others. Other notable paintings by Jared Flagg include Holy Thoughts and Paul before Felix (1849), and Angelo and Isabella (1850).

Flagg wrote a biography of his uncle Washington Allston, published by Charles Scribner's Sons in 1892.

=== Notable portraits ===
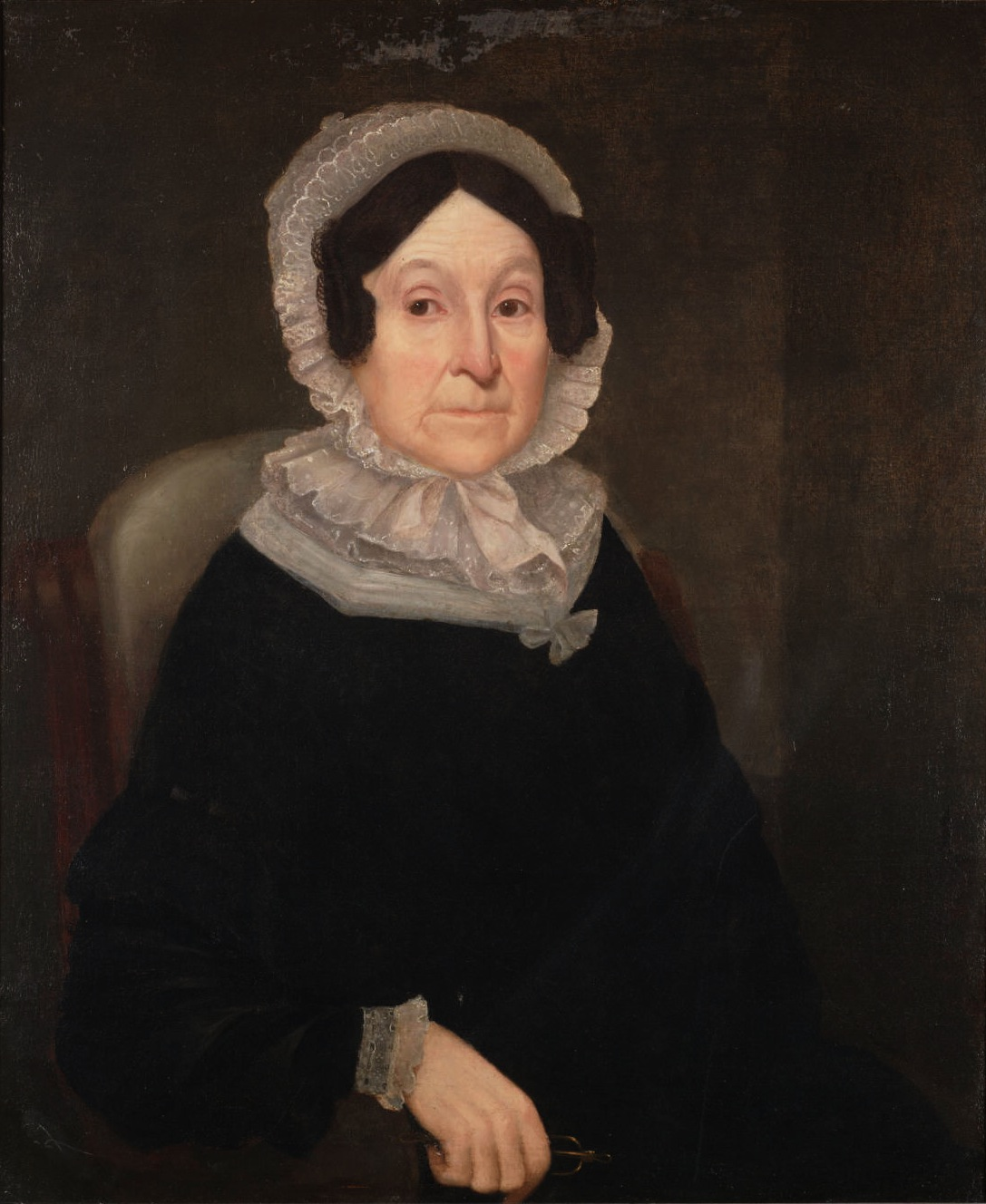
Portrait of Rebecca Greenleaf Webster, c. 1840

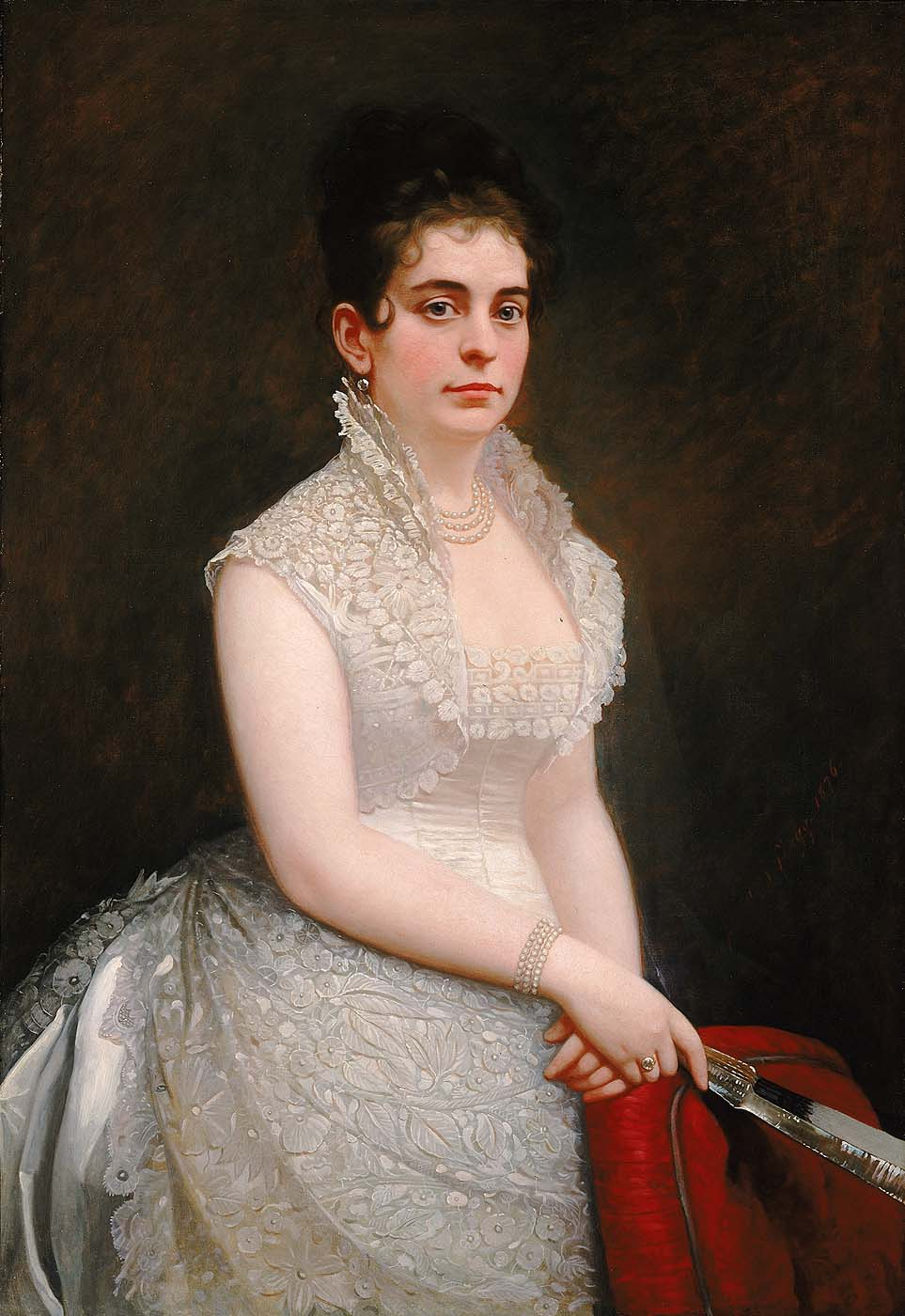
Portrait of Alice Pike Barney, 1876

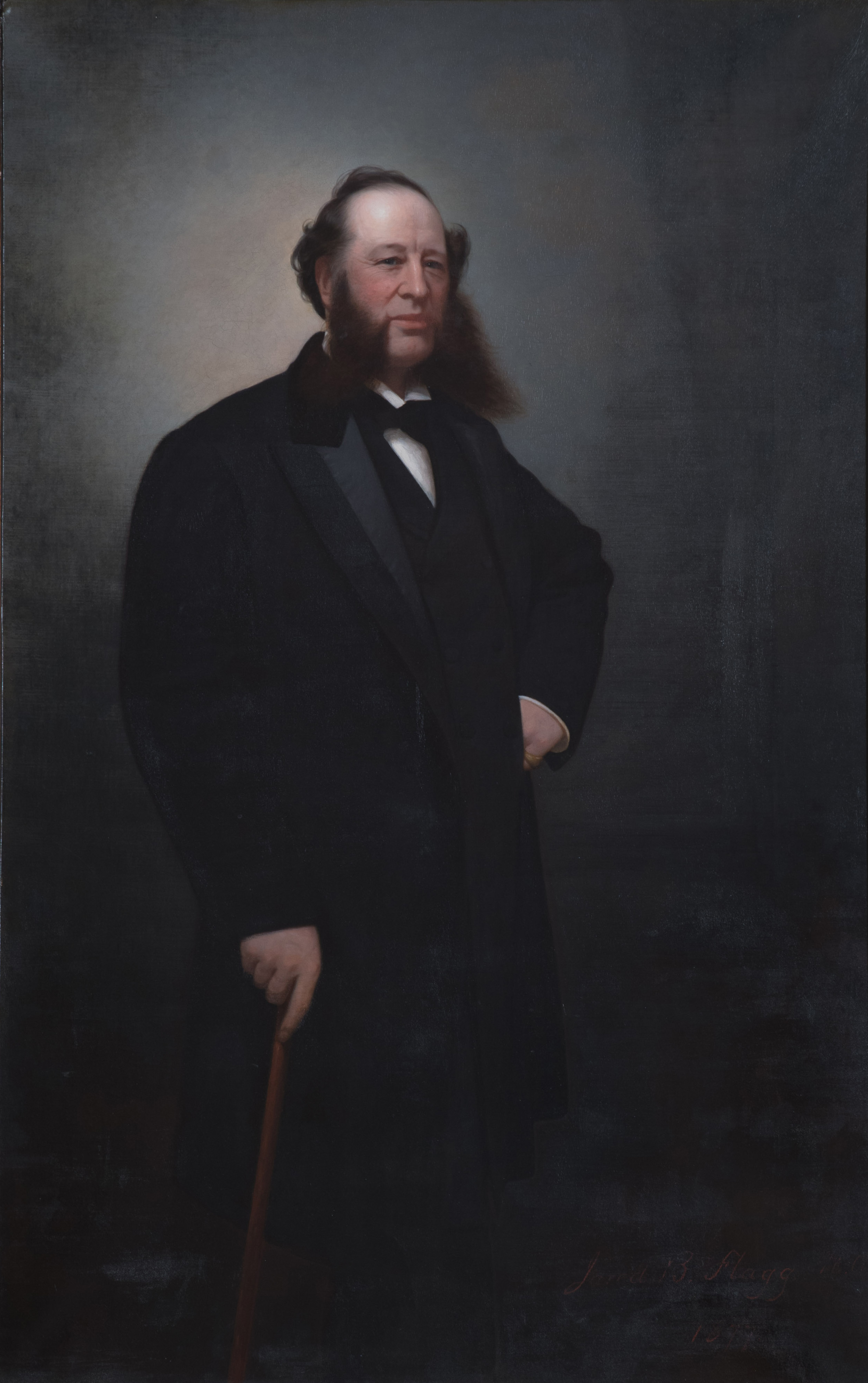
Portrait of William Henry Vanderbilt, 1877

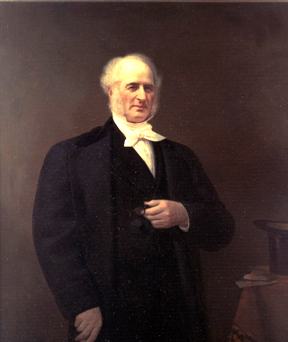
Portrait of Cornelius Vanderbilt, 1879

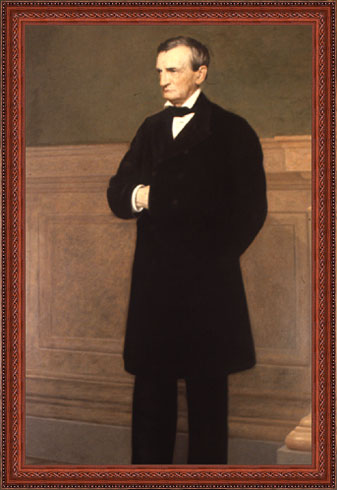
Portrait of William M. Evarts, 1887

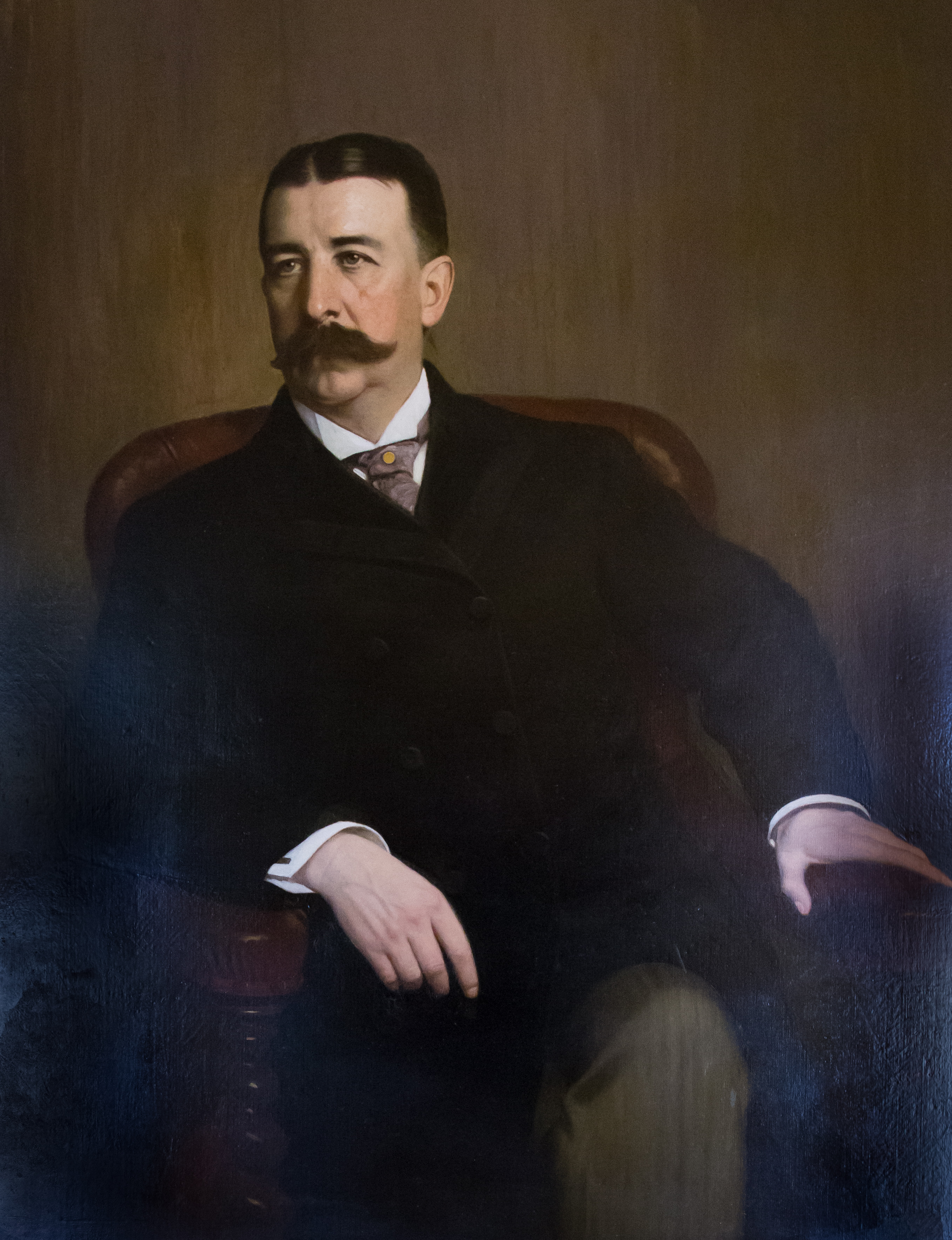
Flagg's official portrait of Rhode Island Governor Daniel Russell Brown, c. 1895

== Personal life ==
Flagg was married three times. His first marriage was to Sarah Montague (1823–1844) on December 30, 1841. Together, Sarah and Jared were the parents of:

- Montague Flagg (1842–1915), a portrait painter who married Elise Cordier (d. 1916).

After Sarah's death in 1844, he remarried to Amelia Louisa Hart (1828–1867) on December 1, 1846. Amelia was a daughter of Dr. Samuel Hart and Orpha (née North) Hart. Her older brother, Samuel Waldo Hart, served as the Mayor of New Britain, Connecticut. Together, Jared and Amelia were the parents of:

- Charles Noel Flagg (1848–1916), an artist who married Ellen Fanny Earle (1852–1920), daughter of Morris Earle, in 1874.
- Jared Bradley Flagg Jr.(1853–1926), a New York City investor who was convicted of operating a Ponzi scheme with Daniel N. Morgan, who had been United States Treasurer under President Cleveland.
- Ernest Flagg (1857–1947), a notable architect who married Margaret Elizabeth Bonnell (1882–1978) in 1899.
- Washington Allston Flagg (1860–1903), who married Anna Davis Robins (1865–1939) in 1886. After his death, she married John Turner Atterbury in 1908.
- Louise Flagg (1862–1948), who married publisher Charles Scribner II.
- Rosalie Allston Flagg (1866–1949), who married William Dexter Jaffray (1863–1949).

After Amelia's death in 1867, he married for the third time to Josephine Bond (1832–1911) in 1869. Josephine was a daughter of Lucy (née Strong) Bond and Judge William Key Bond, a former U.S. Representative from Ohio.

Flagg died of heart disease on September 25, 1899, at 253 West 42nd Street, his residence in New York City. After a funeral at St. Bartholomew's Church at the corner of 44th Street and Madison Avenue, he was buried at Evergreen Cemetery in New Haven.
