= The Breakers =

Vanderbilt mansion in Newport, Rhode Island, US

- U.S. National Register of Historic Places
- U.S. National Historic Landmark
- U.S. National Historic Landmark District – Contributing property
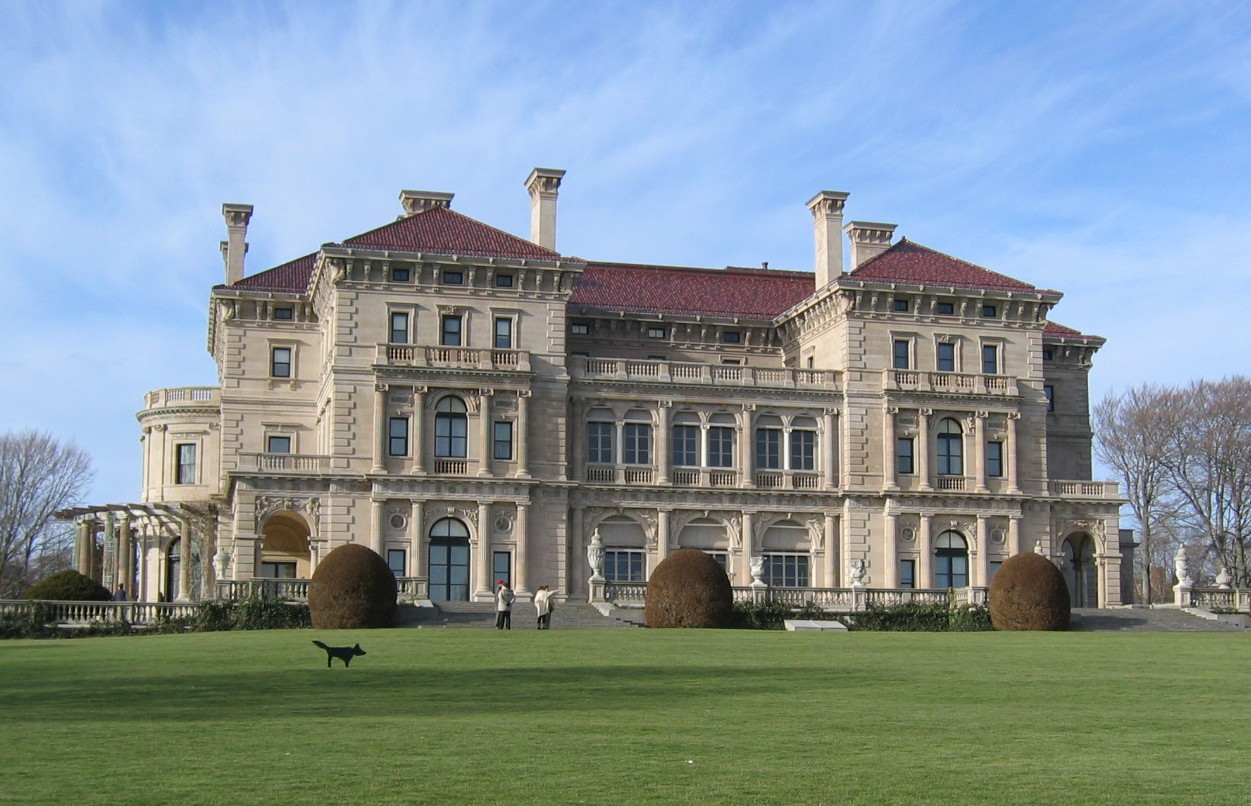
- Interactive map showing The Breakers' location
- Location: 44 Ochre Point Avenue, Newport, Rhode Island
- Coordinates: 41°28′11″N 71°17′55″W
- Built: 1895
- Architect: Richard Morris Hunt
- Architectural style: Neo Italian Renaissance
- Part of: Bellevue Avenue Historic District (ID72000023)
- NRHP reference No.: 71000019

Significant dates
- Added to NRHP: September 10, 1971
- Designated NHL: October 12, 1994
- Designated NHLDCP: December 8, 1972

The Breakers is a Gilded Age mansion located at 44 Ochre Point Avenue, Newport, Rhode Island, US. It was built between 1893 and 1895 as a summer residence for Cornelius Vanderbilt II, a member of the wealthy Vanderbilt family.

The 70-room mansion, with a gross area of 138,300 square feet (12,850 m^{2}) and 62,482 square feet (5,804.8 m^{2}) of living area on five floors, was designed by Richard Morris Hunt in the Renaissance Revival style; the interior decor was by Jules Allard and Sons and Ogden Codman Jr.

The Ochre Point Avenue entrance is marked by baroque forged wrought iron gates, and the 30-foot-high (9.1 m) walkway gates are part of a 12-foot-high (3.7 m) limestone-and-iron fence that borders the property on all but the ocean side. The footprint of the house covers approximately one acre (0.4 hectares) or 43,000 square feet of the 14-acre (5.7-hectare) estate on the cliffs overlooking Easton Bay of the Atlantic Ocean.

The house was added to the National Register of Historic Places in 1971, and was designated a National Historic Landmark in 1994. It is also a contributing property to the Bellevue Avenue Historic District. The property is owned and operated by the Newport Preservation Society as a historic house museum and is open for visits all year.

== History and ownership ==
=== Construction and design ===
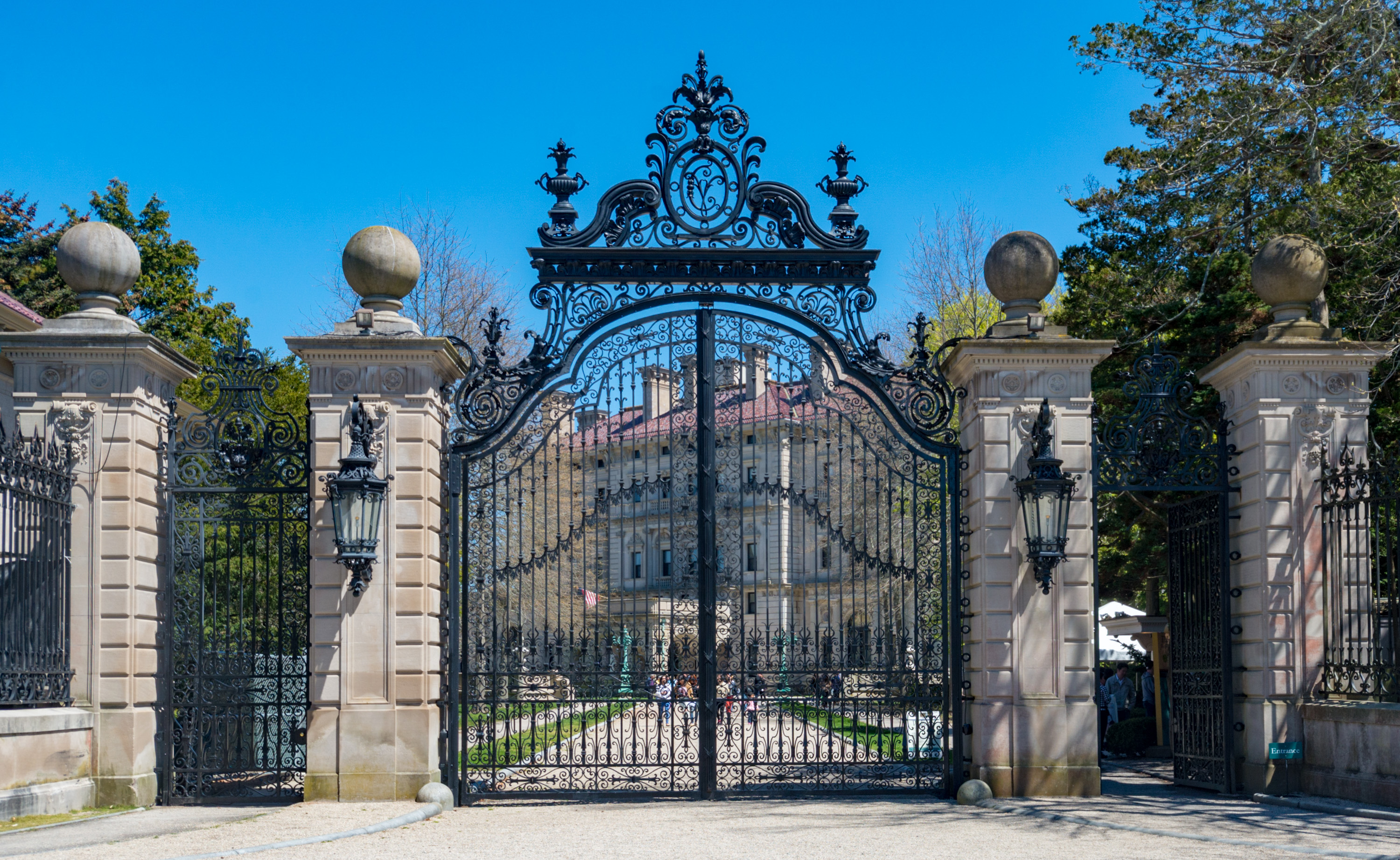
The gate at The Breakers

Cornelius Vanderbilt II purchased the grounds in 1885 for $450,000 (equivalent to $16.1 million in 2025). The previous mansion on the property was owned by Pierre Lorillard IV; it burned on November 25, 1892, and Vanderbilt commissioned architect Richard Morris Hunt to rebuild it in splendor. Vanderbilt insisted that the building be made as fireproof as possible, resulting in a structure composed of masonry and steel trusses, with no wooden parts. He even required that the boiler be located away from the house in an underground space below the front lawn.

The designers created an interior using marble imported from Italy and Africa, and rare woods and mosaics from countries around the world. It also included architectural elements purchased from chateaux in France, such as the library mantel. Expansion was finally finished in 1892.

The Breakers is the architectural and social archetype of the "Gilded Age", a period when members of the Vanderbilt family were among the major industrialists of America. It was the largest, most opulent house in the Newport area upon its completion in 1895.

=== Alice Vanderbilt: 1899–1934 ===
Cornelius Vanderbilt II died from a cerebral hemorrhage caused by a stroke in 1899 at age 55. His will provided his widow Alice Gwynne Vanderbilt with a life interest in The Breakers, as well as the power to bequeath the property to whichever of their children she chose. During Alice's widowhood the costs of maintaining The Breakers rose substantially, with property taxes rising to $83,000 annually by the mid-1920s. The house required 33 indoor servants and 25 servants to run, and its boilers consumed over 150 tons of coal each year. Alice outlived Cornelius by 35 years and died at the age of 89 in 1934. She left The Breakers to her youngest daughter Countess Gladys Széchenyi (1886–1965), essentially because Gladys lacked American property; in addition, none of her other children were interested in the property, while Gladys had always loved the estate.

=== Gladys Vanderbilt Széchenyi: 1934–1965 ===
Although Gladys had also inherited approximately $3,500,000 in cash and stocks from her mother's estate, as well as $1,480,000 in cash and the income from a $5,000,000 Trust fund from her father's estate in 1899, in the months following Alice's death there was widespread speculation amongst the Newport elite that Gladys would not open the house, based on a commonly-held belief that she did not possess the financial resources required to maintain the house and the large staff required for its upkeep.

In 1935 the Washington Herald reported that it was common knowledge in local circles that Gladys considered her mother's decision to bequeath The Breakers to her as more of a liability than a gift, and it was rumoured that an offer had been made to her by a business syndicate to purchase the property with the intention of transforming the house into a hotel. Gladys first resumed her occupancy of The Breakers after inheriting the property two years after her mother's death during the summer of 1936.

==== Wartime Use ====
The property was not occupied by Gladys and her family from 1939 to 1942; instead summers were spent at the Newport home of her elder sister Gertrude Vanderbilt Whitney. Gladys offered the property to the Civilian Defense Council in 1942, after which it was temporarily known as "Newport No. 1 air raid shelter".

The Breakers was the site of a major civilian air-raid drill in January 1943; over 500 air-raid wardens, auxiliary workers and other volunteers took part, using the house's extensive basements as part of the exercise. Countess Gladys Vanderbilt Széchenyi was present in her capacity as Red Cross Volunteer. The Breakers was reportedly the first air-raid shelter established in Newport during the Second World War.

==== Opened for public tours ====
It was announced on 10 June 1948 that the high-maintenance property would be leased to The Preservation Society of Newport County for $1 per year, with rooms on the ground floor to be opened for tours from 1 July 1948. The initial price of tours was $1.25 plus taxes per adult. Revenues from tours and ticket sales were paid to The Preservation Society, whilst Gladys continued to meet the cost of property taxes, insurance and major repairs. The cost of property taxes for 1964 was reportedly $16,046. The Preservation Society continued to operate The Breakers as a tourist attraction, whilst Gladys maintained a private apartment in the upper floors of the house until her death in 1965.

Under the terms of Gladys' will, The Breakers was left in equal shares to her four surviving daughters, as well as the three children of her eldest daughter Cornelia, who had predeceased her mother in 1958. The will stipulated that the family had a year from the date of Gladys' death to determine if they wished to retain the property or disclaim it; if they chose to disclaim the property, it would pass into the ownership of the Preservation Society of Newport. If the Society in turn chose not to accept the bequest, the Breakers would then pass into the ownership of The United States National Trust for Historial Preservation.

Gladys' executors valued the property at $192,000, though the IRS later instigated legal action over the size of Gladys' estate in 1969, claiming that the value of the property when Gladys died should have been assessed at $250,000.

On 31 December 1965 the Newport Mercury and Weekly News announced that a spokesperson for The Preservation Society of Newport had confirmed that the family had reached an informal agreement for The Breakers to be opened to the public again during the summer of 1966, but that no permanent decision had yet been reached regarding the property's future. Following Gladys' death, The Preservation Society took over the payment of property taxes on the building.

=== The Preservation Society of Newport: 1972–present ===
The Preservation Society of Newport purchased The Breakers on 28 December 1972 for $365,000 (equivalent to $2.81 million in 2025) from Gladys's heirs (her four surviving daughters Alice Hadik, Sylvia Szapary, Gladys Peterson, Nandine Eltz, and the three children of the late Countess Cornelia "Gilia" Széchényi de Sárvár-Felsövidék, Gladys R. Thomas, Cornelia Coudenhove-Kalergi, and Eugene B. Roberts). The family members who sold the property gifted much of its furniture and contents to The Preservation Society of Newport.

At the time of the sale it was reported that over 1.5 million visitors had paid to tour The Breakers since it was first opened to the public in 1948, and that The Preservation Society of Newport then expended some $500,000 on wages (for over 100 full-time and part-time staff), maintenance and upkeep of the property each year.

Under the sale agreement, Countess Sylvia Szapary, Gladys's daughter, was granted a life tenancy of her mother's modest private apartment on the third floor of the house. The apartment reportedly comprised more than half of the third floor on the southern side of the house, within a series of rooms initially used as the living quarters for the sons of Cornelius Vanderbilt II which was decorated by Ogden Codman Jr.. It reportedly contains eight bedrooms, a living room with ocean views, and a small kitchen converted from a former housekeeper's room. Access from the museum floors open to the public was said to initially have blocked with infant safety-gate on a staircase connecting the second and third storeys.

Following Sylvia Szapary's death in 1998, The Preservation Society agreed to allow the family to continue to live on the third floor, which is not open to the public. The-then President of the Board of The Preservation Society of Newport reportedly advised Sylvia's children in a letter penned in 1998 that "it will be helpful to us to be able to tell our visitors that the original owners' great-grandchildren continue to live in the house."

By 2015, Syvlia's children Paul and Gladys Szapary (grandchildren of Gladys Vanderbilt Szechenyi) were still summering at the Breakers; that year they and other Vanderbilt relatives publicly opposed the Society's plan for a visitor center on the 13-acre grounds, arguing it would compromise the site's character, while the Society said the facility would provide accessible ticketing and visitor amenities. Following the dispute, the Szaparys vacated the third floor of The Breakers in 2018, which was again opened for public tours in 2024.

As of 2017, it was the most-visited attraction in Rhode Island, with approximately 450,000 visitors annually.

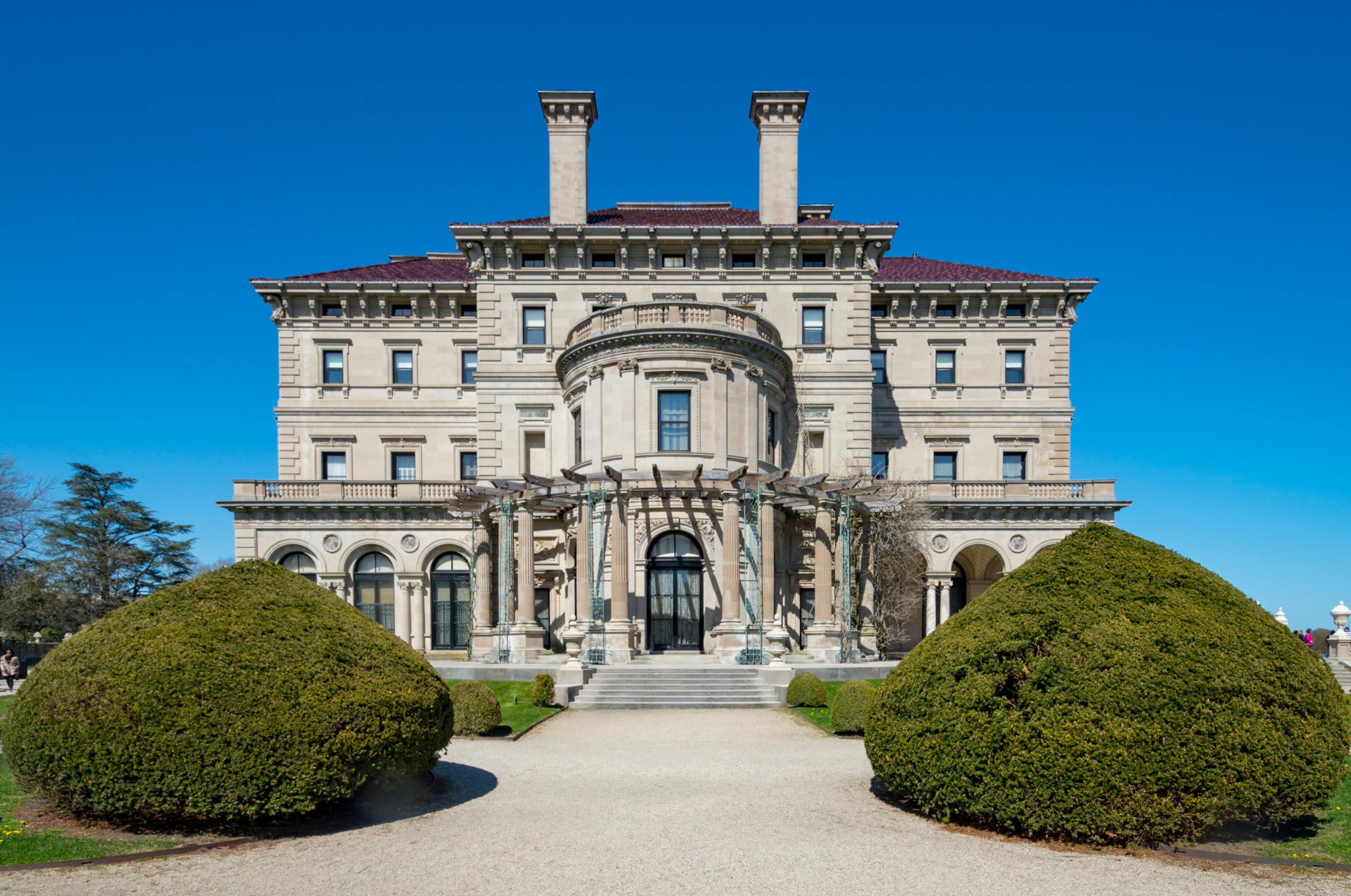
The building's exterior, framed by topiaries

== Gardens ==
The pea-gravel driveway is lined with maturing pin oaks and red maples. The trees of The Breakers' grounds act as screens that increase the sense of distance between The Breakers and its Newport neighbors. Among the more unusual imported trees are two examples of the Blue Atlas Cedar, a native of North Africa. Clipped hedges of Japanese yew and Pfitzer juniper line the tree-shaded footpaths that meander about the grounds. Informal plantings of arbor vitae, taxus, Chinese juniper, and dwarf hemlock provide attractive foregrounds for the walls that enclose the formally landscaped terrace.

The grounds also contain several varieties of other rare trees, copper and weeping beeches. Today's pattern for the south parterre garden was determined from old photographs and laid out in pink and white alyssum and blue ageratum. The wide borders paralleling the wrought iron fence are planted with rhododendrons, mountain laurel, dogwoods, and many other flowering shrubs that effectively screen the grounds from street traffic and give visitors a feeling of seclusion.

== Layout ==
=== Basement ===
- Laundry
- Staff's restrooms

=== First floor ===
- Entrance foyer
- Gentlemen's reception room
- Ladies' reception room
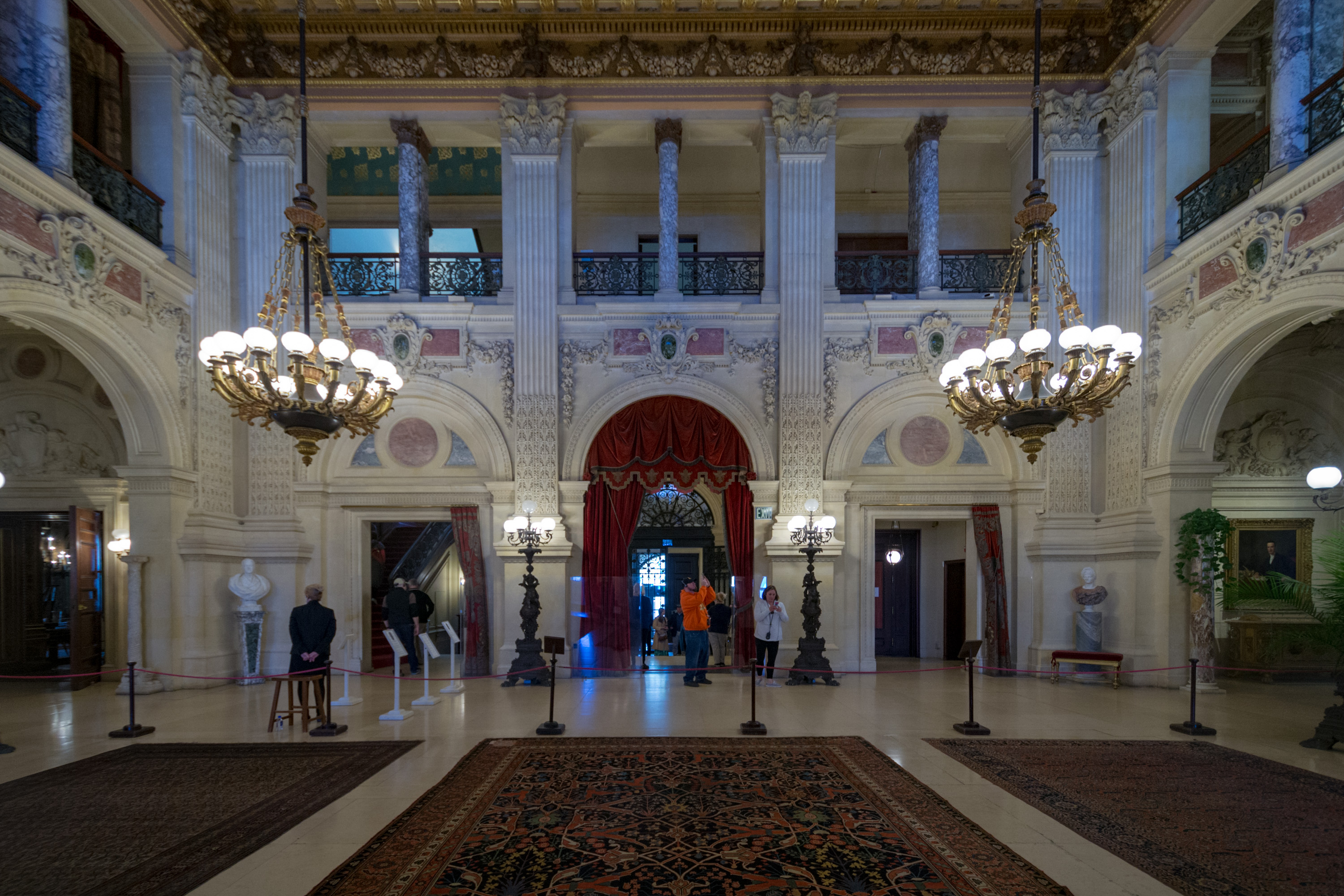
  The great hall
- Great hall (50 ft × 50 ft × 50 ft [15 m × 15 m × 15 m]) – Over each of the six doors that lead from the Great Hall are limestone figure groups celebrating humanity's progress in art, science, and industry: Galileo, representing science; Dante, representing literature; Apollo, representing the arts; Mercury, representing speed and commerce; Richard Morris Hunt, representing architecture; and Karl Bitter, representing sculpture.
- Main staircase
- Arcade
- Library – The library has coffered ceilings painted with a dolphin, symbolic of the sea and hospitality, supported by Circassian walnut paneling impressed with gold leaf in the form of a leather-bound book. Between the ceiling and the gold paneling lies green Spanish leather embossed with gold, which continues into the library from the alcove used for cards. Inside the central library are two busts: a bronze of William Henry Vanderbilt II, the oldest child of Cornelius II and Alice, who died of typhoid at the age of 21 while attending Yale University; and a marble of Cornelius Vanderbilt II. The fireplace, taken from a 16th-century French chateau (Arnay-le-Duc, Burgundy), bears the inscription "I laugh at great wealth, and never miss it; nothing but wisdom matters in the end."
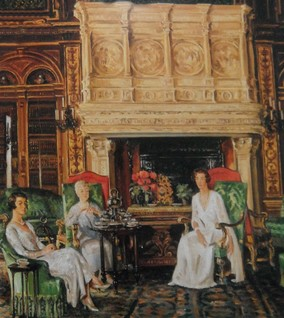
  Mrs. Cornelius Vanderbilt II (Alice Claypoole Vanderbilt) and her daughters, Gladys Vanderbilt Széchenyi and Gertrude Vanderbilt Whitney, having tea in the library at The Breakers, Newport, Rhode Island, William Bruce Ellis Ranken, 1932
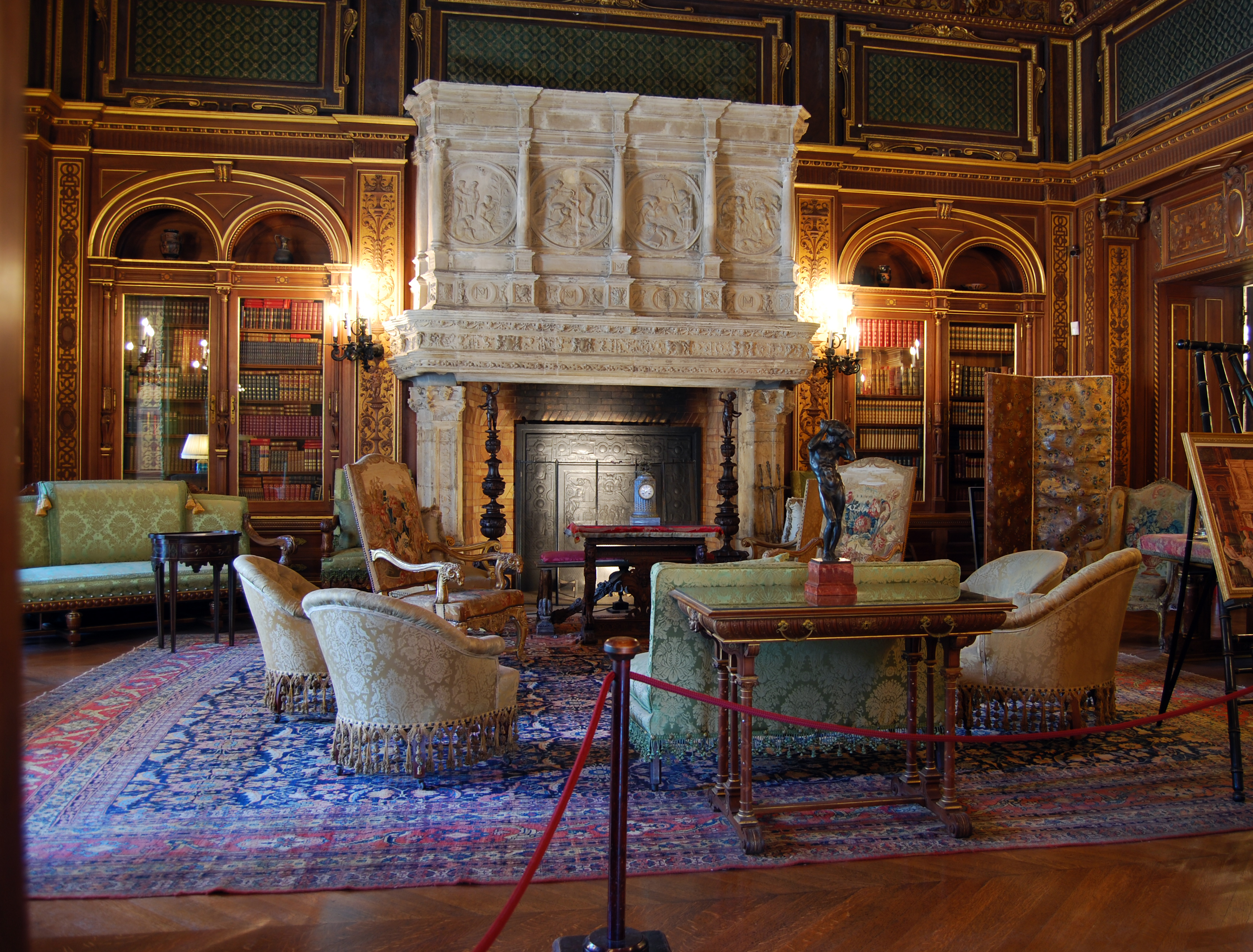
  The library at The Breakers
- Music room – The room's open interior was used for recitals and dances. Its woodwork and furnishings were designed by Richard Van der Boyen and completed by Jules Allard and Sons. The room has a gilt coffered ceiling lined with silver and gold, as well as an elliptical ceiling molding which bears the inscription in French of song, music, harmony and melody. Around the edge are the names of well-known composers. The fireplace is of Campan marble and the tables were designed to match. Mr. Vanderbilt was known to play the violin and Mrs. Vanderbilt the piano, which is a Second Empire French mahogany ormolu mounted piano.
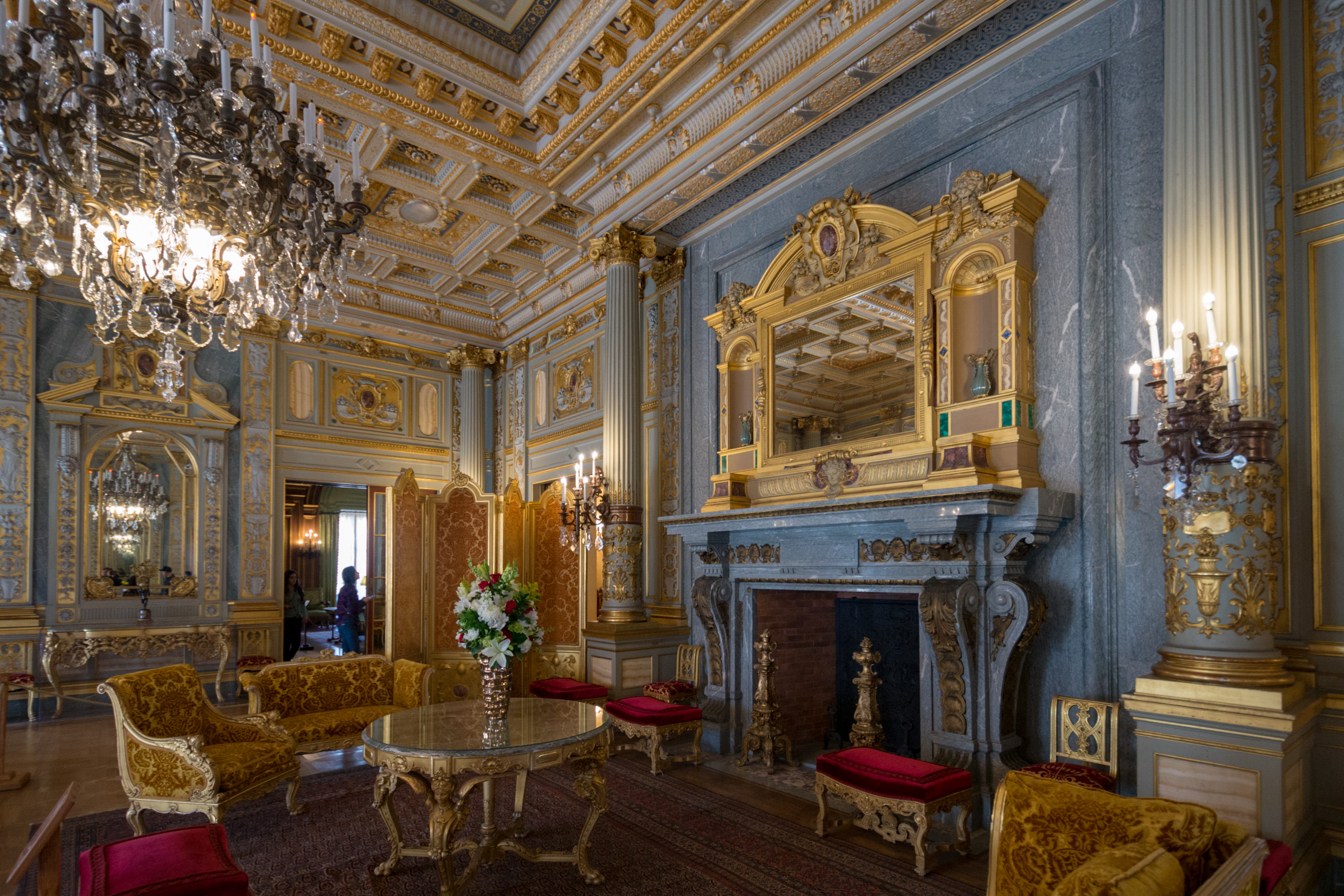
  The music room

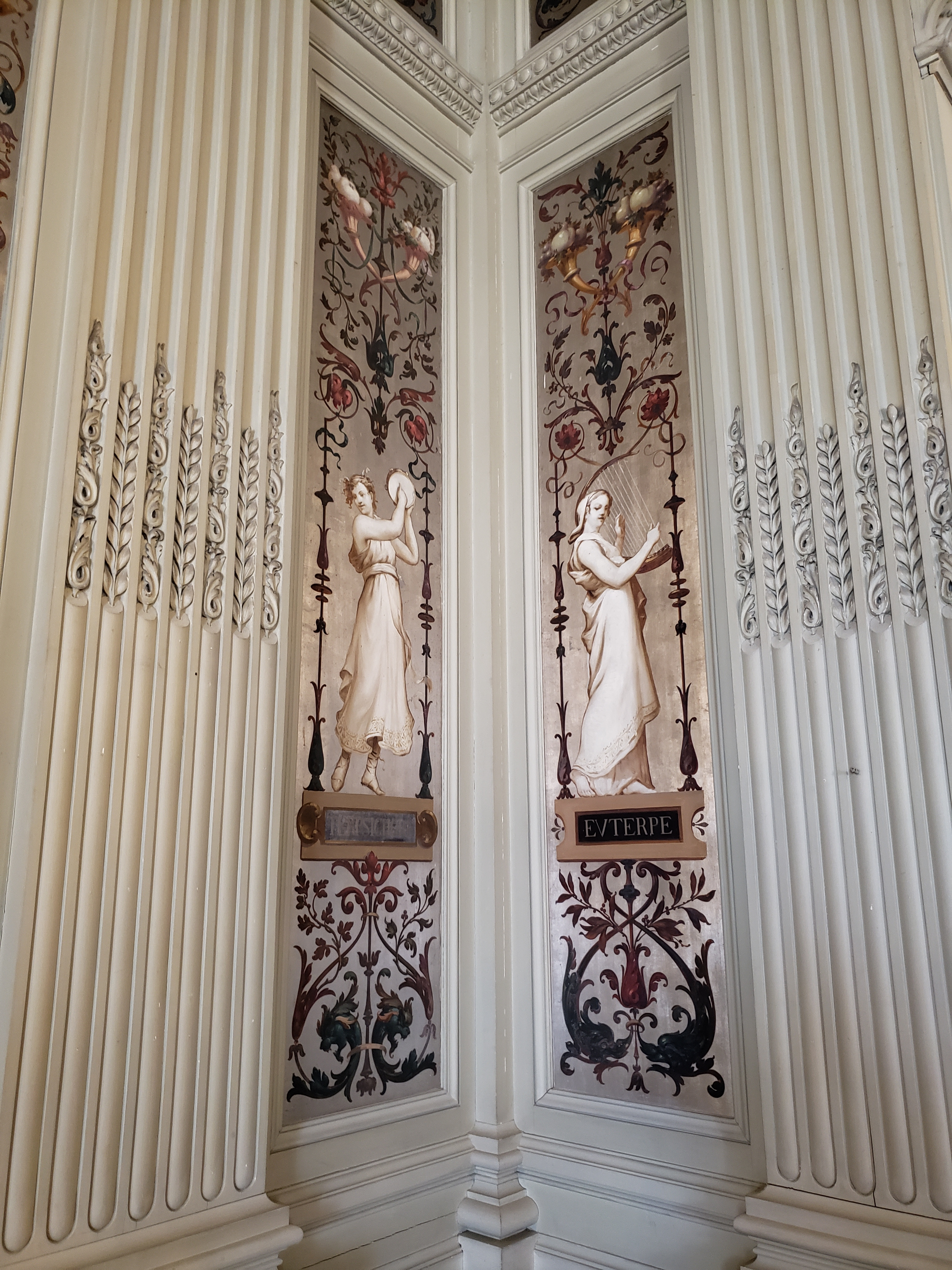
Platinum wall decor in the Morning room

- Morning room – Designed by the French company head Jules Allard, this communal sitting room faces east to admit the morning sun, and was used throughout the day. Placed around the room are platinum-leafed panels illustrated with 8 of the 9 muses. All interior woodwork and furnishings were designed and constructed in France, then shipped to America before assembly.
- Lower loggia
- Billiards room – Designed in the style of ancient Rome, this room shows Richard Morris Hunt's competence in stone works. The great slabs of Cippolino marble from Italy form the walls, while rose alabaster arches provide contrast. Throughout the room there is an assortment of semi-precious stones, forming mosaics of acorns (the Vanderbilt family emblem, intended to show strength and longevity) and billiards balls on the top walls. The Renaissance style mahogany furniture provides further contrast with that of the colored marble.
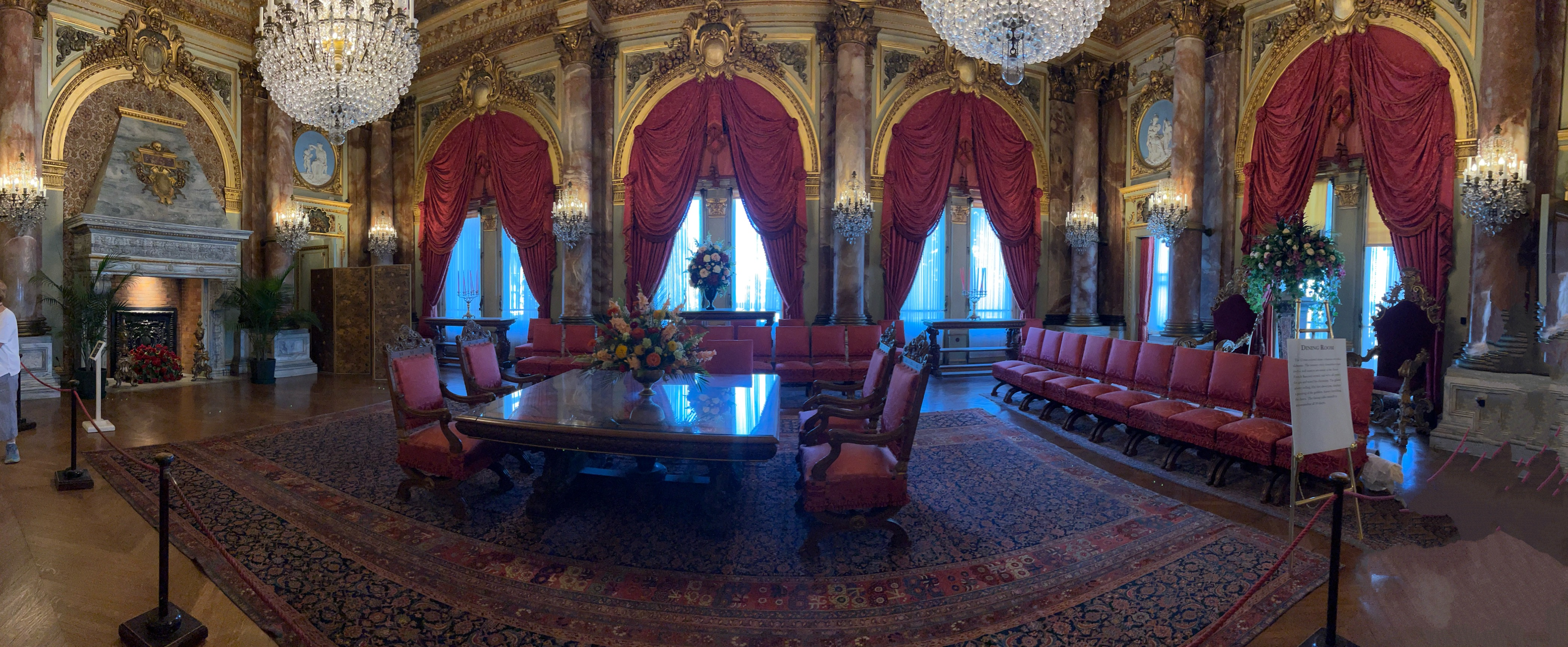
- Dining Room
  Dining room – The 2,400 ft^{2} (220 m^{2}) dining room is the house's grandest room and has 12 freestanding rose alabaster Corinthian columns supporting a colossal carved and gilt cornice. Rich in allegory, this room serves as an exemplar of what 19th-century technology could do with Roman ideas and 18th-century inspiration. On the ceiling, the goddess Aurora is depicted bringing in the dawn on a four-horse chariot as Greek figures pose majestically. A 16th-century style table of carved oak seats up to 34. Two Baccarat crystal chandeliers light the room with either gas or electricity, and 18, 22 or 24 carat gold gilt is adhered to the wall with rabbit-skin glue.
- Breakfast room – The breakfast room, with its modified Louis XV style paneling and furnishings, was used for family morning meals. The furnishings, colors and gilt, although still extravagant in their use, contrast with the dining room's more lavish decoration.
- Pantry – A central dumbwaiter brought additional china and glassware down from the mezzanine level. The pantry was also used for the storage of the family's table silver; this was brought with the family when they traveled, and stored in a steel vault. An intercom system allows the butler to direct the necessary servants to their needed locations, and each number on the caller corresponds to a number on a room.
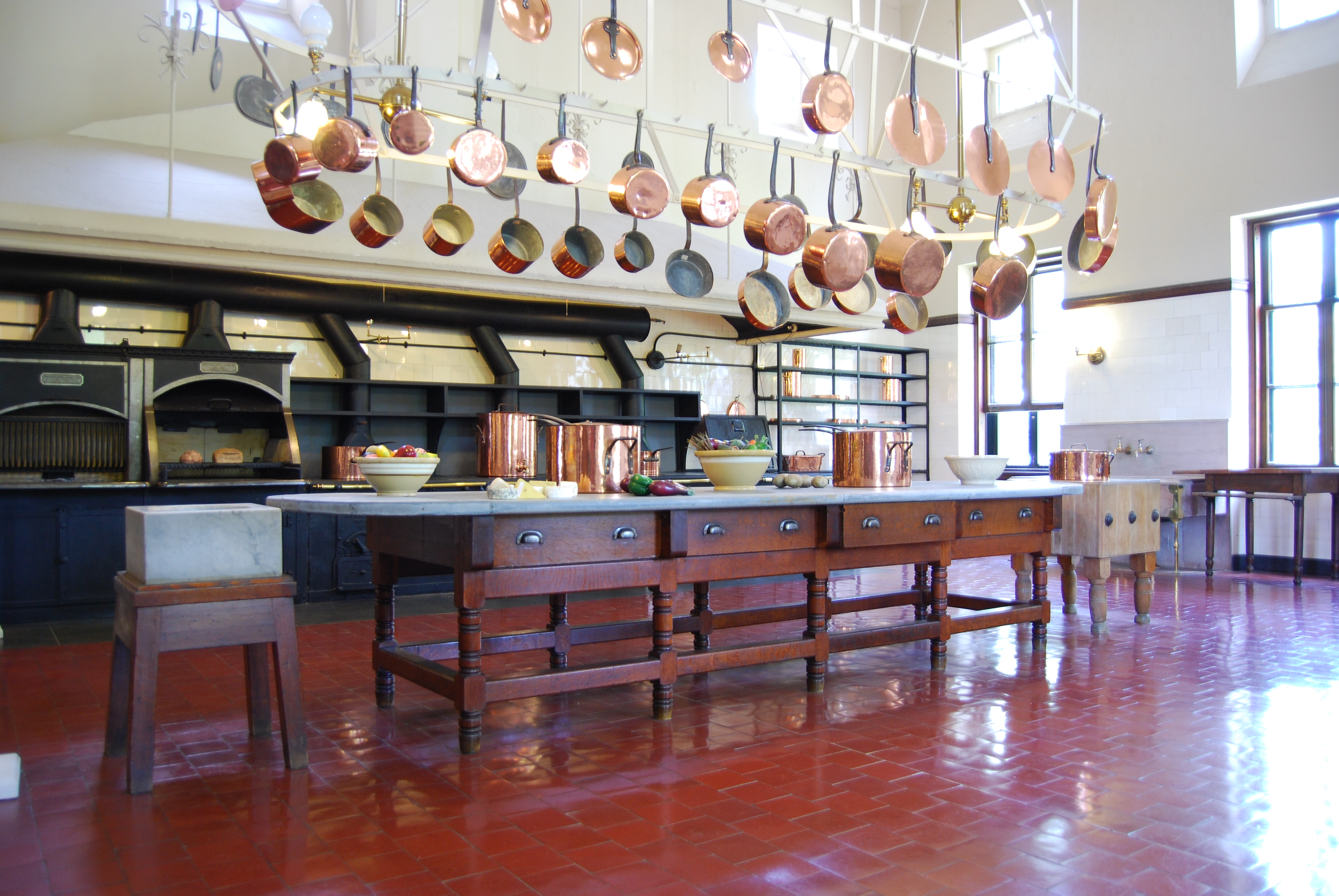
  The kitchen
- Kitchen – The kitchen, unlike others in the time period, was situated on the first floor away from the main house to prevent the possibility of fires and cooking smells reaching the main parts of the house. The well-ventilated room supports a 21 ft (6.4 m) cast iron stove, which heats up as a single element through a coal burning stove. The work table is made of zinc, a metal which served as the forerunner to stainless steel; in front of it is a marble mortar used to crush various ingredients. Ice cut in winter from the local ponds kept the side rooms cool where food was stored, and facilitated a colder room for the assembling of confections. The kitchen and baking pantry each have one dumbwaiter that travels to the basement level where groceries were delivered and refuse removed.

=== Second floor ===
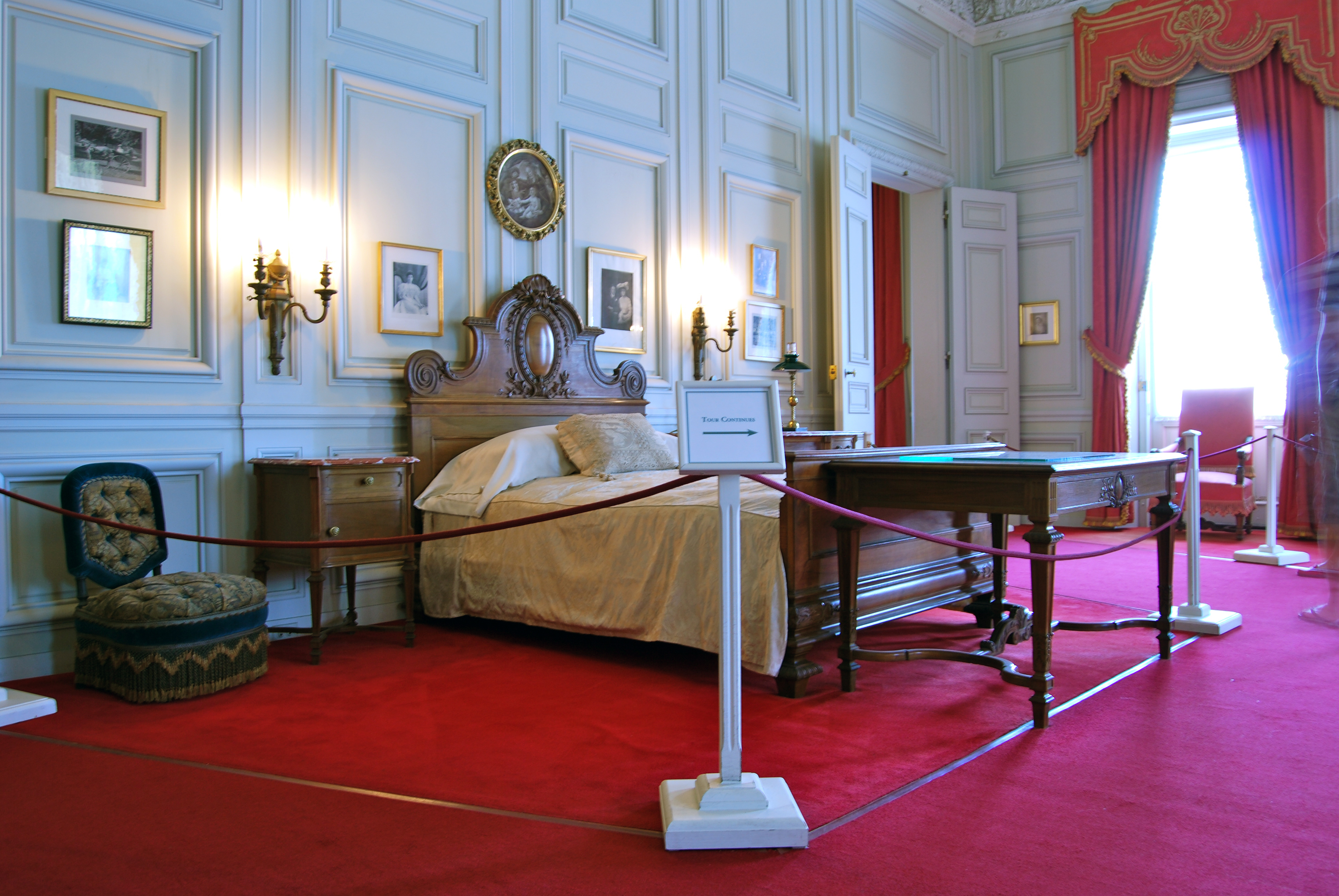
- Mr. Vanderbilt's bedroom
  Mr. Vanderbilt's bedroom – As with the rest of the second floor, Ogden Codman designed this room, choosing Louis XIV Style. The bed is made of carved walnut and the mantel is of rouge royal marble, which hosts a large mirror above to bring more light into the room. There is much memorabilia of family and friends, though Cornelius Vanderbilt II lived only a year at the Breakers in good health, before dying the following year, 1899, of a stroke.
- Mrs. Vanderbilt's bedroom – A perfect oval, Alice Vanderbilt's room has multiple doors connecting it to other bedrooms. Four closets allowed for her possible seven clothing changes per day, and a pager to administer and delegate family needs to the servants. This room also served as her study and had many bookshelves. Additionally, there are discreetly designed corridors that permitted female servants to maintain the laundry and costume needs of the family in a seemingly invisible fashion.
- Miss Gertrude Vanderbilt's bedroom – Gertrude, daughter of Cornelius II and Alice, was a less conforming character who wished to be loved for her personality rather than her wealth and family; later she found her match in Harry Payne Whitney and became an artist. Multiple pieces of her artwork are featured in the room, including "The Engineer", which was inspired by her brother during World War I, "Laborer", and another that commemorates the American Expeditionary Force of World War I. She moved into The Breakers when she was 19. Above her bed is a portrait of her at age 5 by Raimundo de Madrazo y Garreta, and beside it, to the left of the bed, a sketch of her as a young woman.
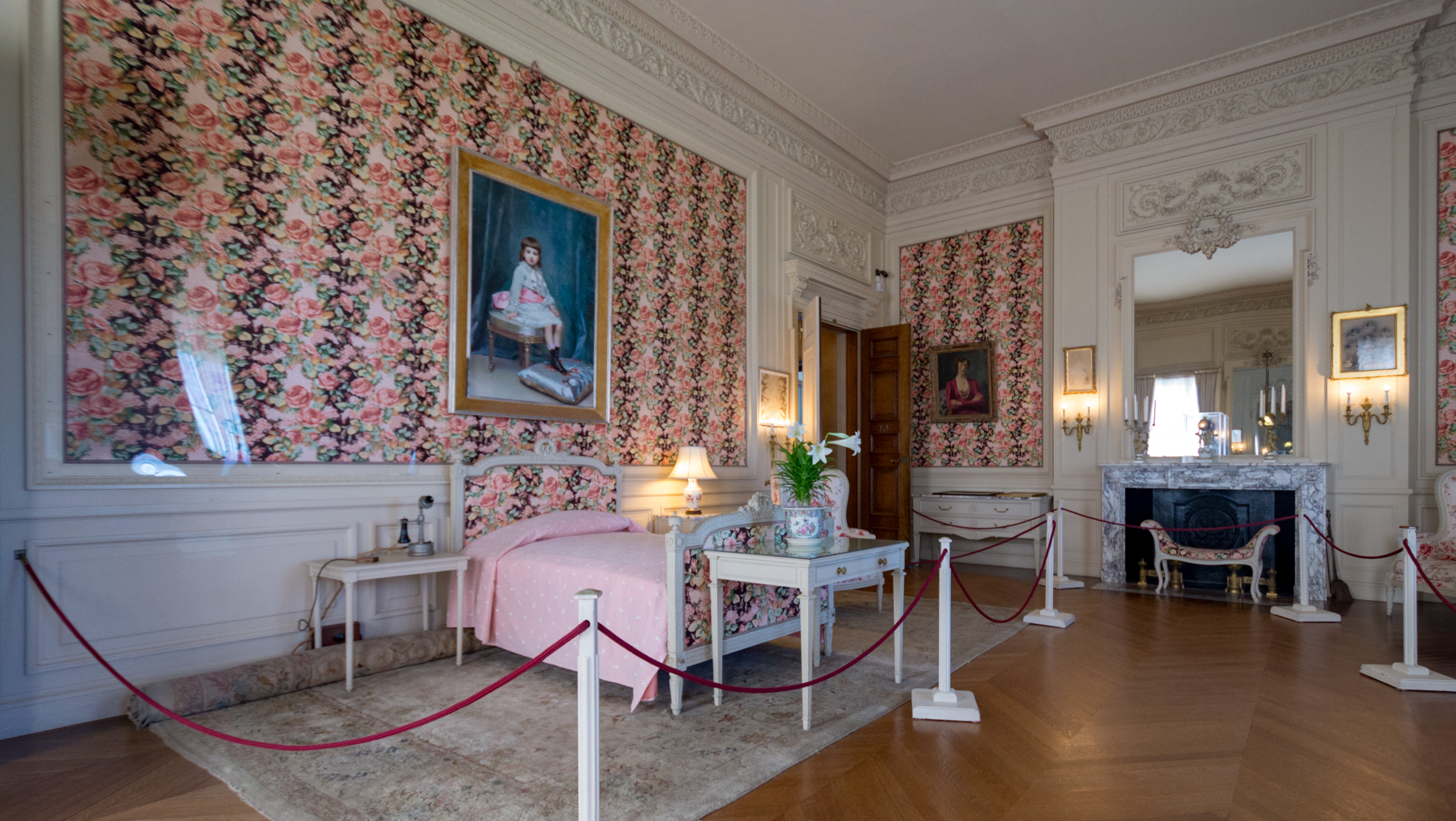
  Miss Gertrude Vanderbilt's bedroom
- Upper loggia – Opening east to the Atlantic, the upper loggia served as an informal living room. During the summer the glass doors overlooking the great hall could be opened to allow a breezeway. The walls are painted marble, and the ceiling is designed to depict three canopies covering the sky. The lawn, designed by James and Ernest Bowdwitch, hosted many parties and was well kept by a gardening staff of 20, who also introduced and maintained various non-indigenous trees.
- Guest bedroom – This room exemplifies the Louis XVI style through furniture, woodwork and light fixtures, with Neoclassical style abounding in the interior. The wall paneling has never been retouched, though the rest of the room has been restored by the preservation society.
- Countess Szechenyi's bedroom – Designed by Ogden Codman in 18th-century simple elegance style, this room features an ivory and cream-colored motif.
- There are also two other rooms located on the second floor, possibly a nursery and a nanny's bedroom.

=== Third floor ===
==== Servant quarters: north wing ====
The north wing of the third-floor quarters were reserved for domestic servants. Using ceilings nearly 18-foot-high (5.5 m), Richard Morris Hunt created two separate third floors to allow a mass aggregation of servant bed chambers. This was because of the configuration of the house, built in Italian Renaissance style, which included a pitched roof. Flat-roofed French classical houses built in the area at the time allowed a concealed wing for staff, whereas the Breakers' design did not permit this feature.

A total of 30 bedrooms are located in the two third-floor staff quarters. Three additional bedrooms for the butler, chef, and visiting valet are located on the mezzanine "entresol" floor, located between the first and second floor just to the rear of the main kitchen.

==== Private apartment: south wing ====
Following the opening of the house for public tours in 1948, Gladys Vanderbilt maintained a private apartment comprising the southern half of the third floor of the house. The apartment was created from a series of rooms initially used as the living quarters for the sons of Cornelius Vanderbilt II, which had been decorated by Ogden Codman Jr. It contains eight bedrooms, a living room with ocean views, and a small kitchen converted from a former housekeeper's room. Access from the museum floors open to the public was said to initially have been blocked with an infant safety-gate on a staircase connecting the second and third storeys.

Following the sale of The Breakers to the Preservation Society of Newport in 1972, Gladys Vanderbilt's daughter Countess Sylvia Szapary was granted a life tenancy of her mother's private apartment on the third floor of the house. Her descendants continued to maintain the apartment until 2018, and this part of the house was eventually opened for public tours in 2024.

=== Attic floor ===
The attic floor contained more staff quarters, general storage areas, and the innovative cisterns. One smaller cistern supplied hydraulic pressure for the 1895 Otis elevator, still functioning in the house even though the house was wired for electricity in 1933. Two larger cisterns supplied fresh and salt water to the many bathrooms in the house.

Over the grand staircase is a stained glass skylight designed by artist John La Farge. Originally installed in the Vanderbilts' 1 West 57th Street (New York City) townhouse dining room, the skylight was removed in 1894 during an expansion of that house.

=== Materials ===
- Foundation: brick, concrete, and limestone
- Trusses: steel
- Walls: Indiana limestone
- Roof: red terra cotta tile
- Wall panels: platinum leaf (eight reliefs of mythological figures only)
- Other: marble (plaques), wrought iron (gates and fences)

=== The architect ===
The Breakers was designed by Richard Morris Hunt, one of the country's most influential architects. It is regarded as a definitive expression of American Beaux-Arts architecture. Hunt's final project, it is also one of his few surviving works, and is valued for its architectural excellence. The home made Hunt the "dean of American architecture", as he was called by his contemporaries, and helped define the Gilded Era in American history.

== Media ==
The house makes an appearance at the end of the establishing shot of the 1990 American drama Reversal of Fortune, where it stands in as the Newport mansion of Sunny and Claus von Bulow, which was instead the nearby Clarendon Court.

The Music room was used in the HBO series The Gilded Age (2022–present), when it featured as the ballroom for the Russell family's coming-out ball for their daughter in the Season 1 finale.

== Gallery ==
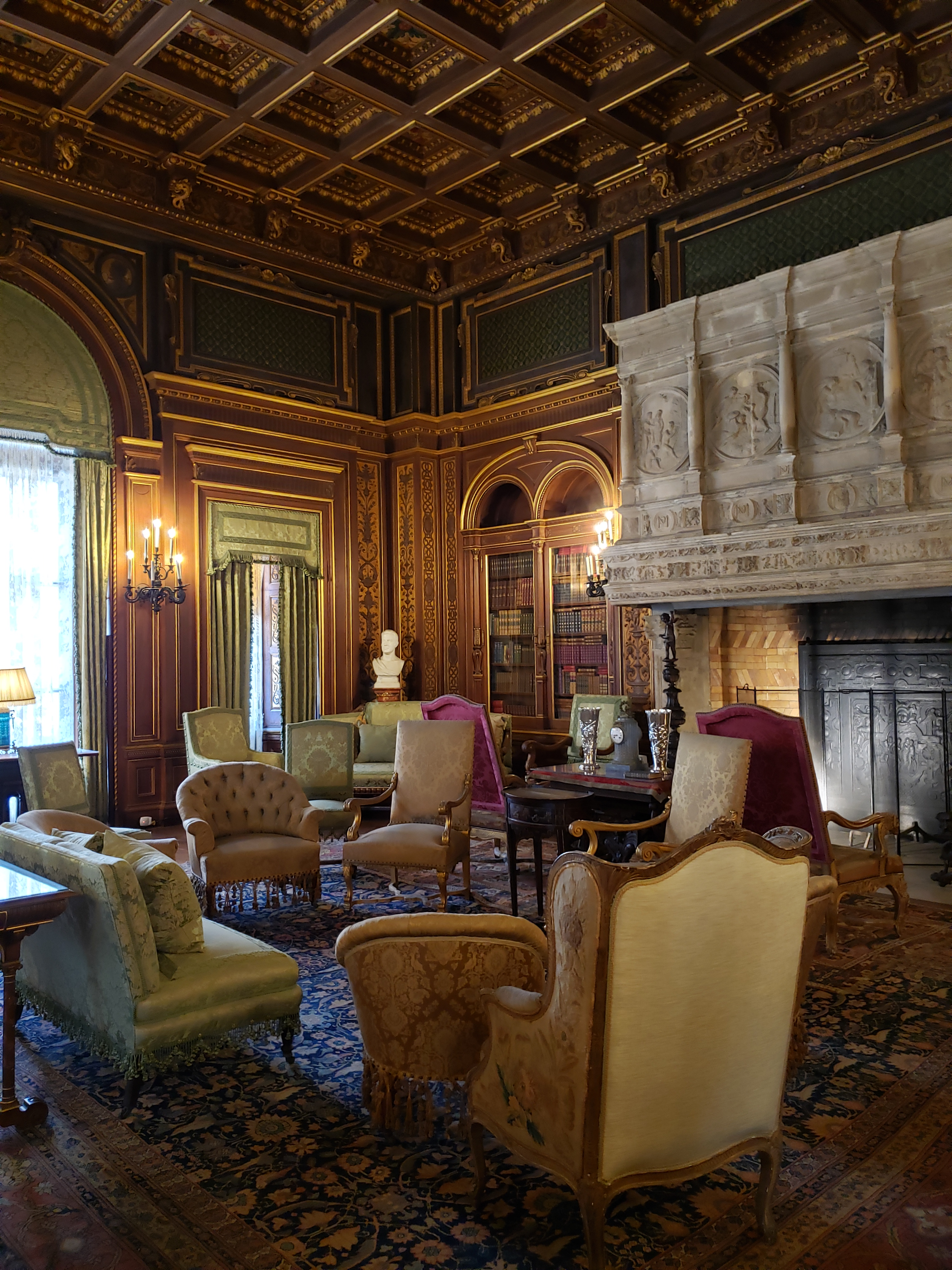
Library

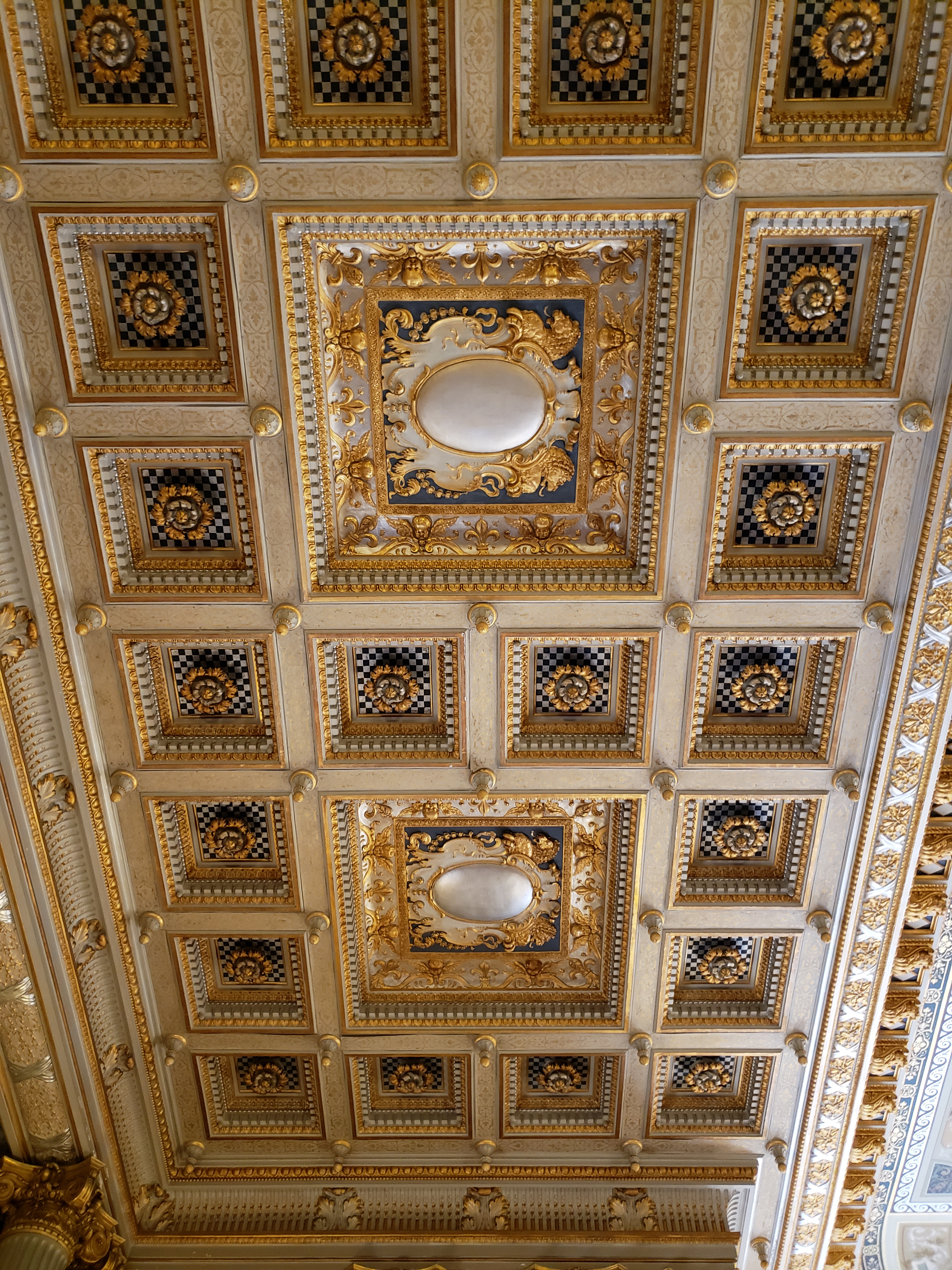
Library ceiling

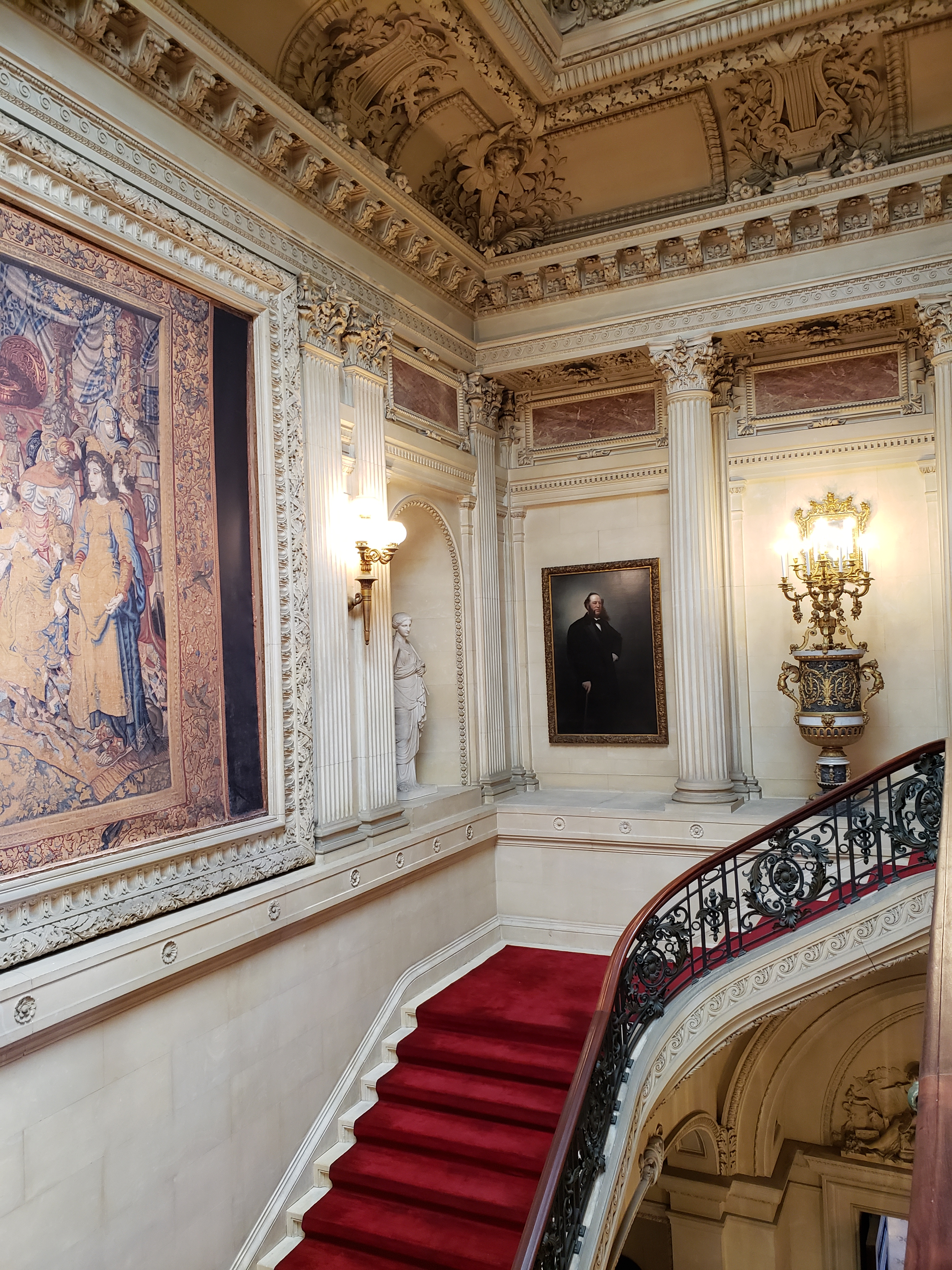
Grand Staircase

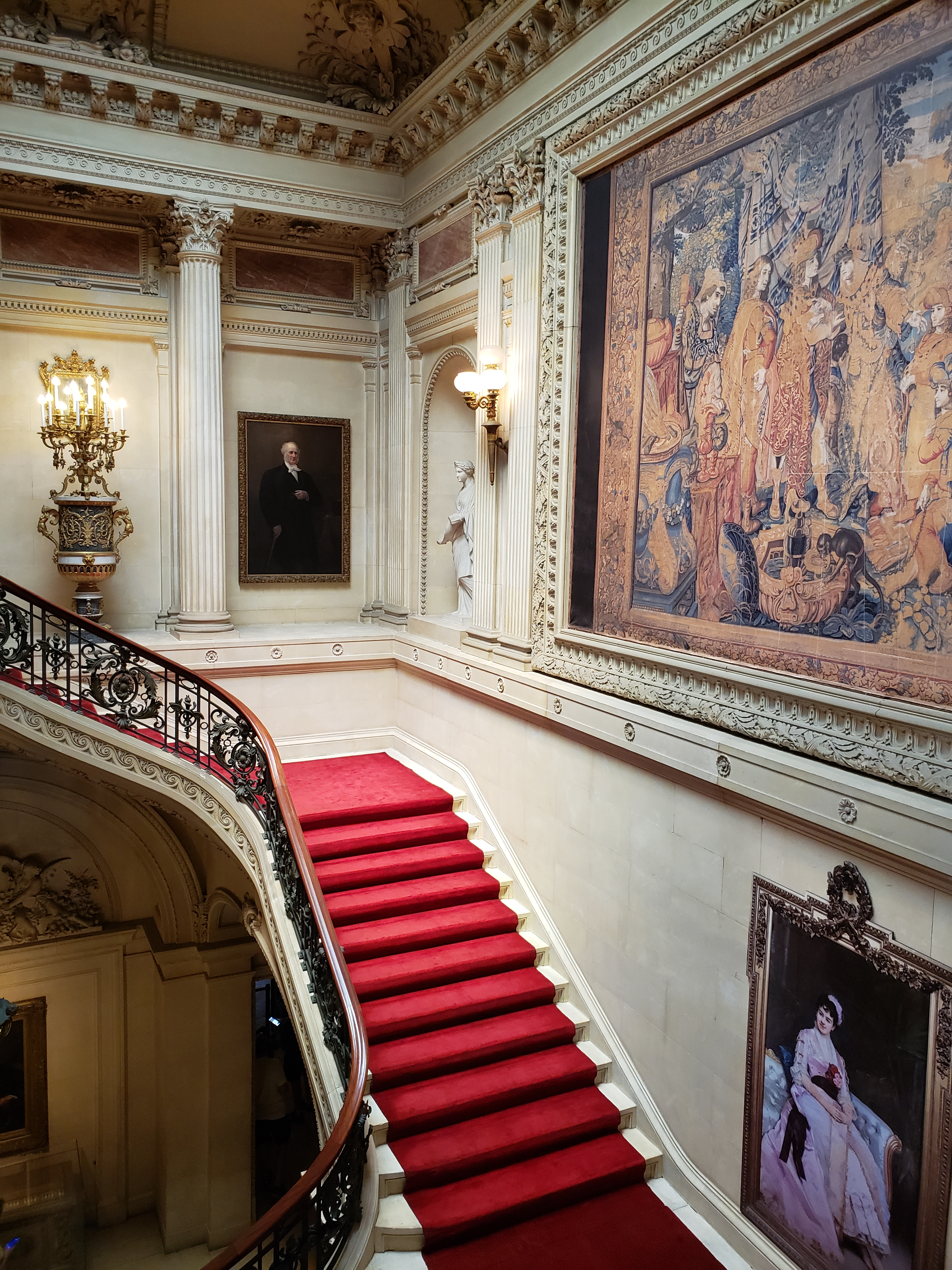
Staircase

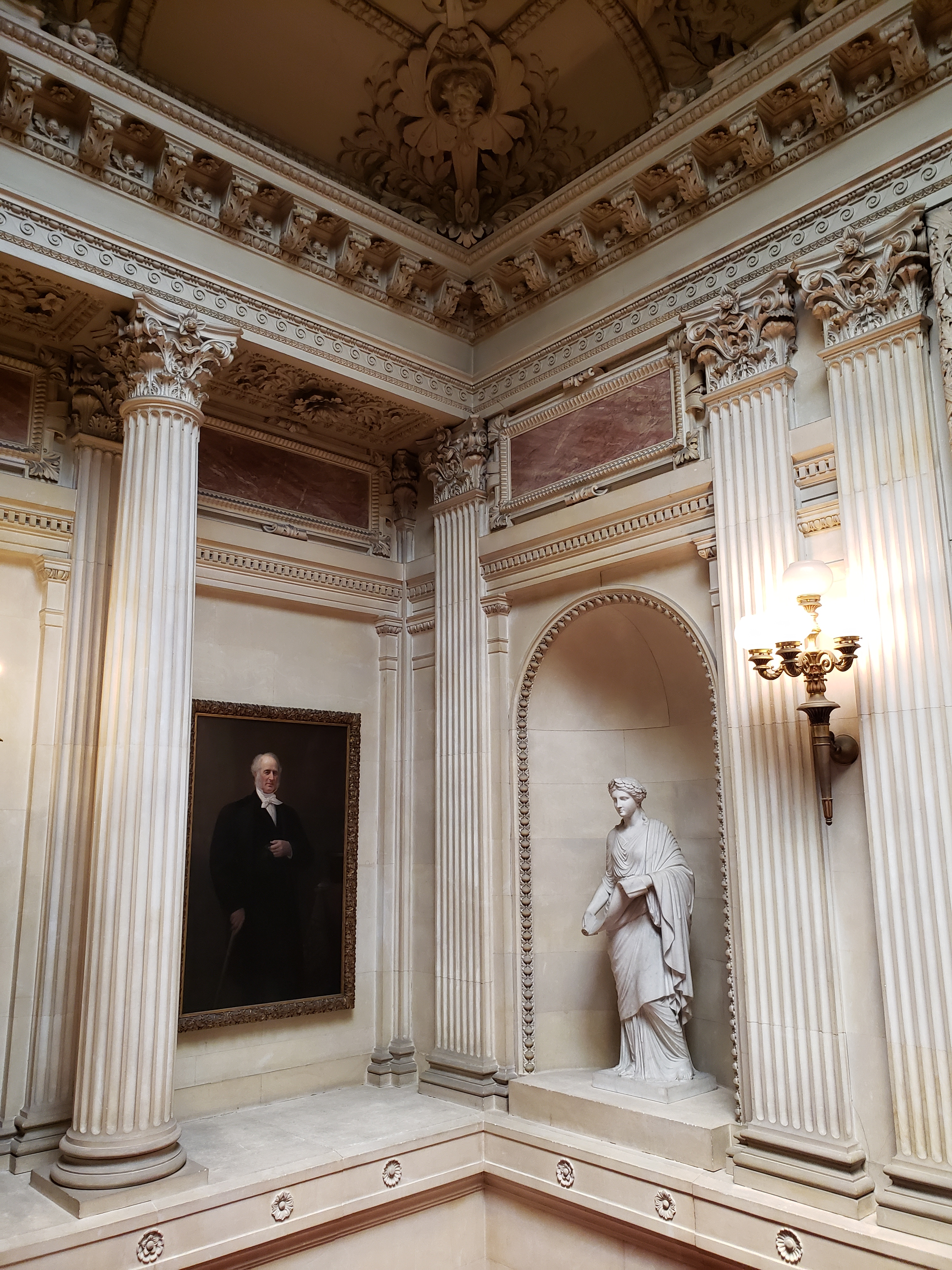
Upper staircase

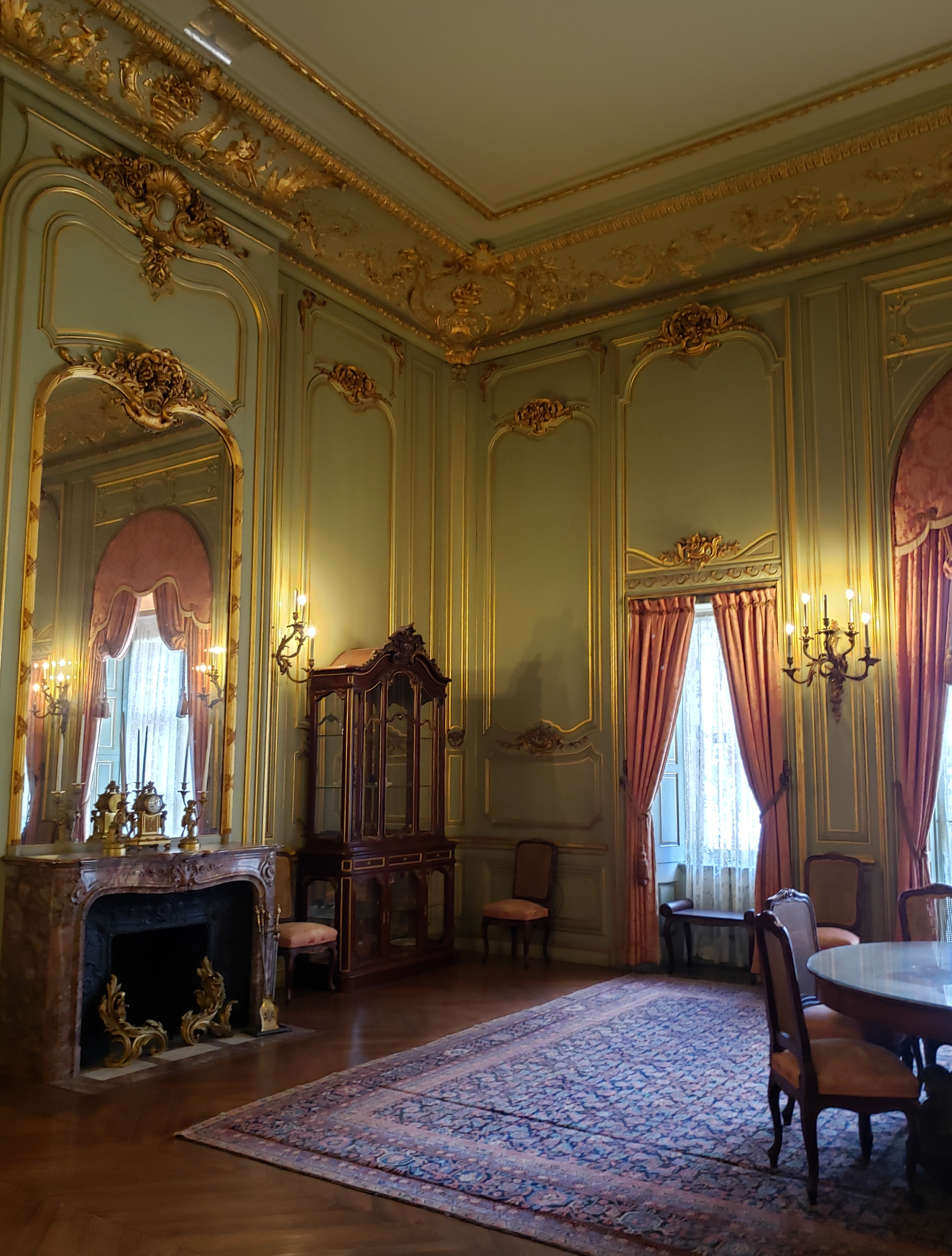
Breakfast room

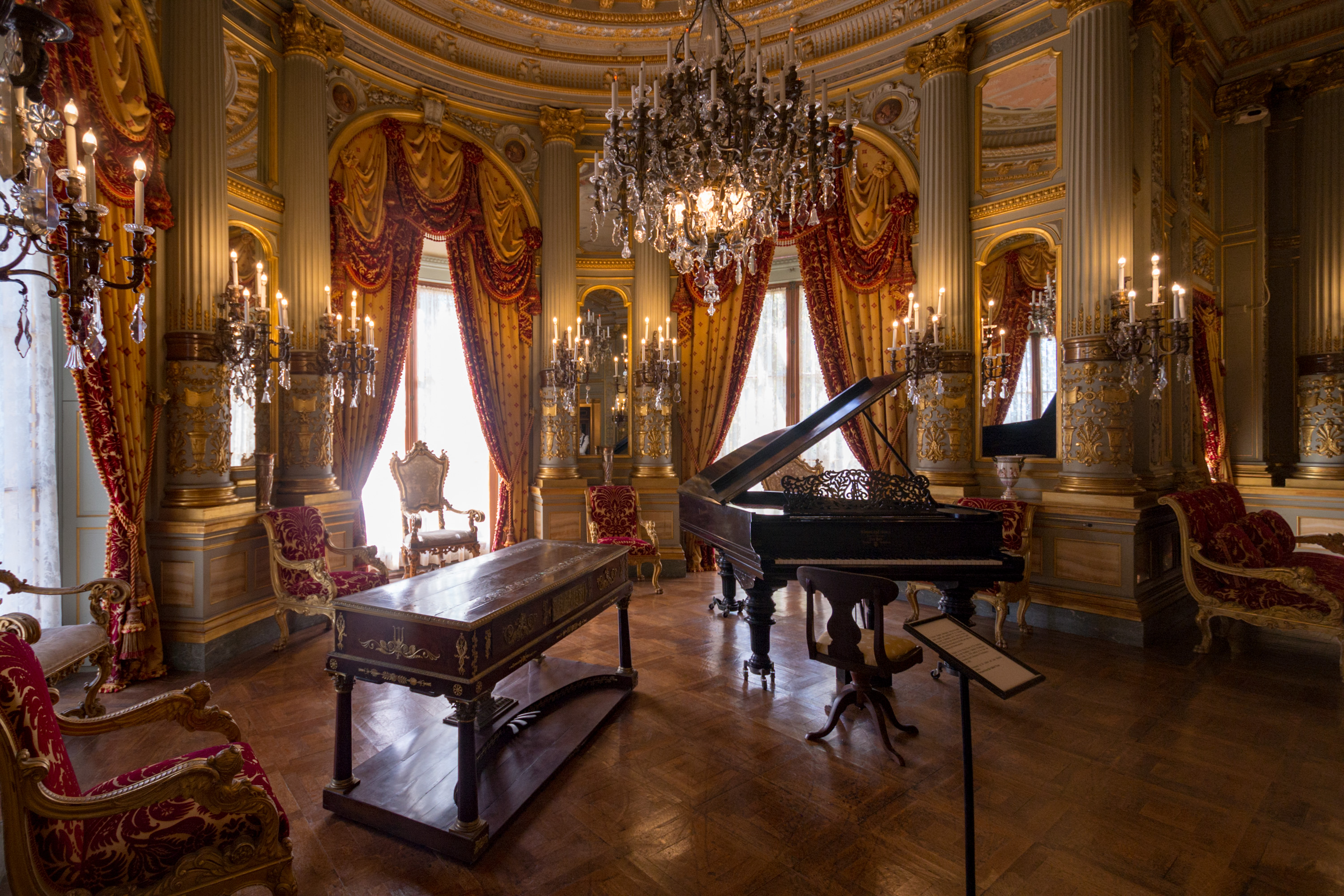
Music room windows

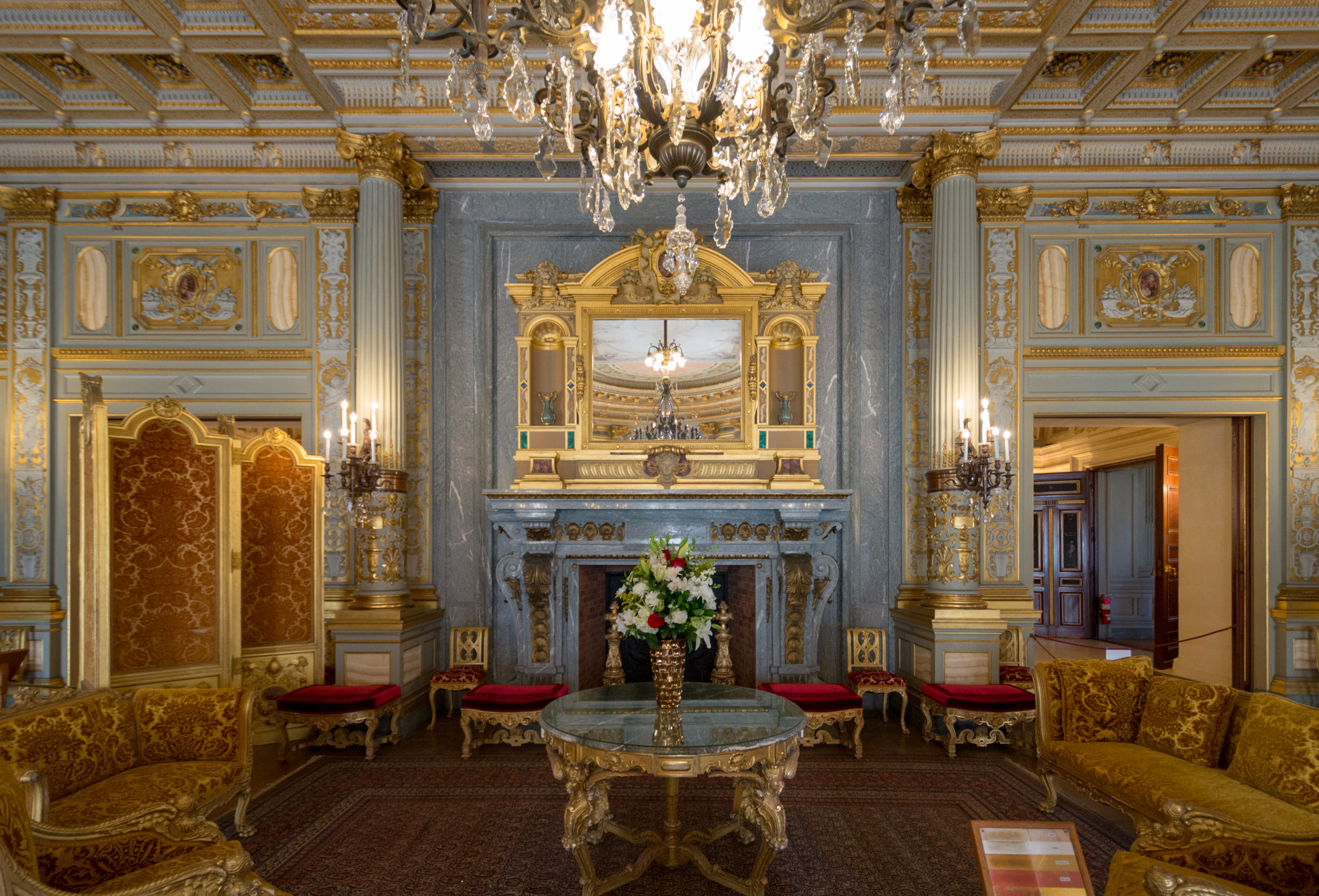
Music room

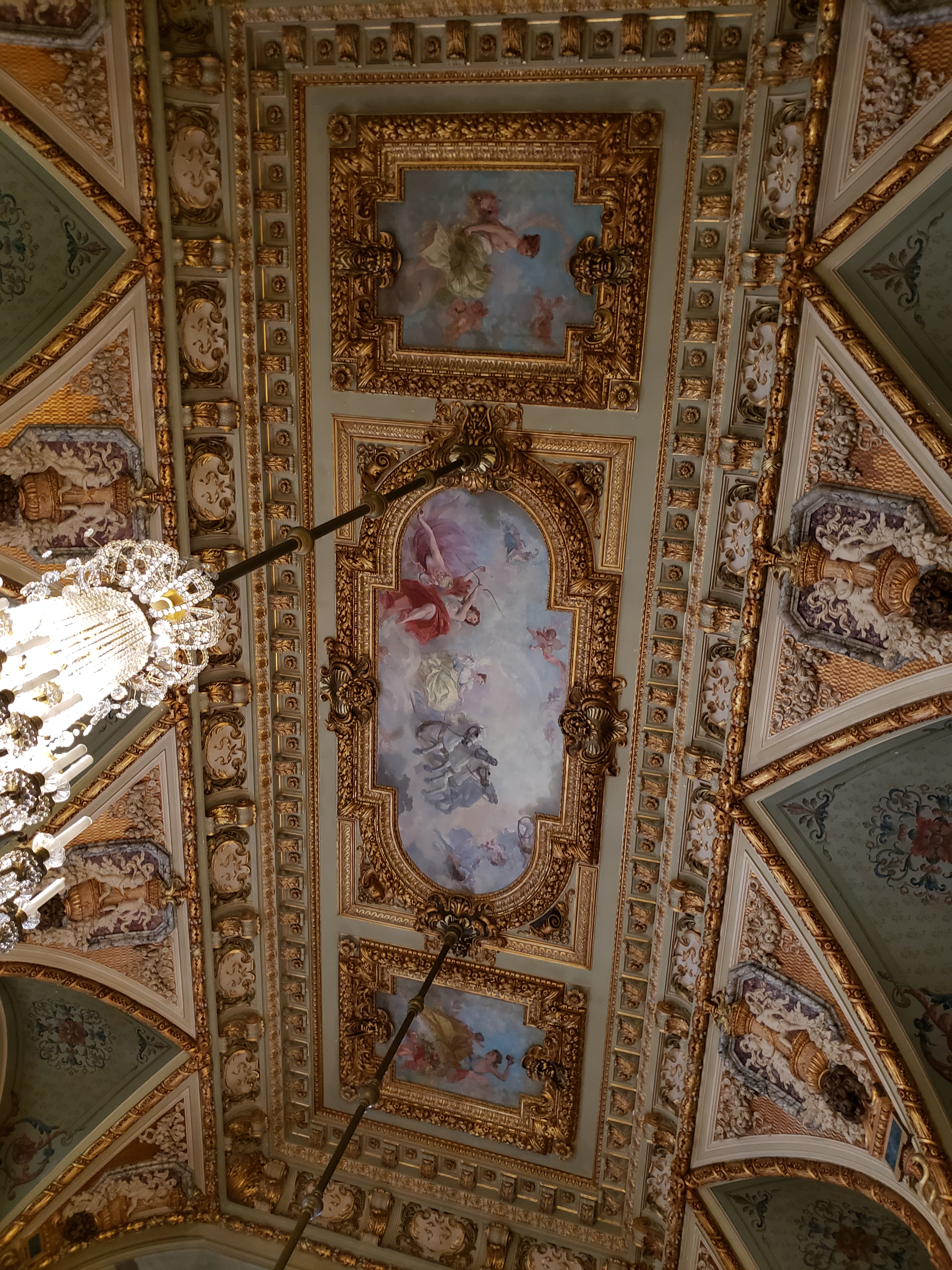
Dining room ceiling

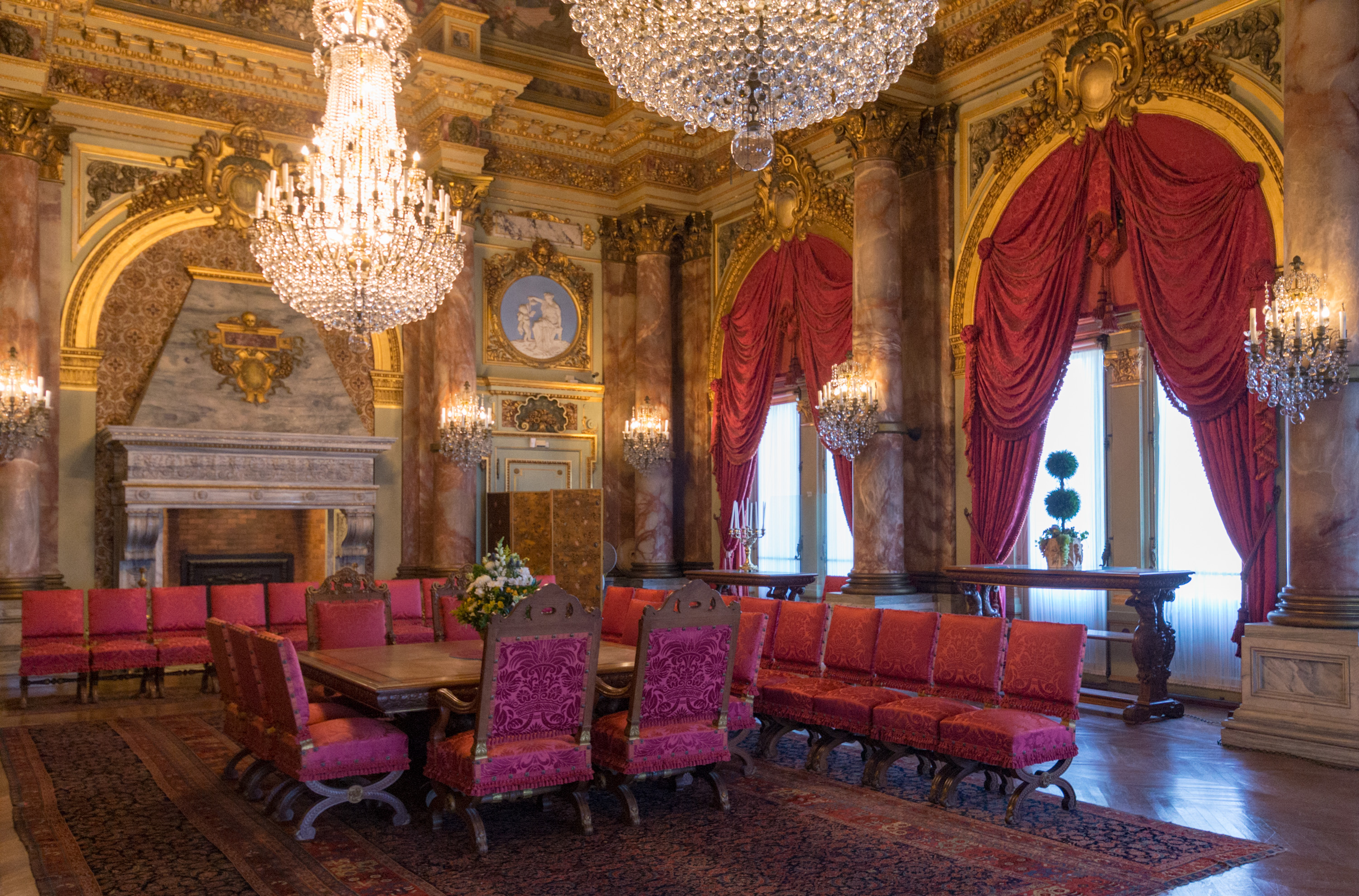
Dining room

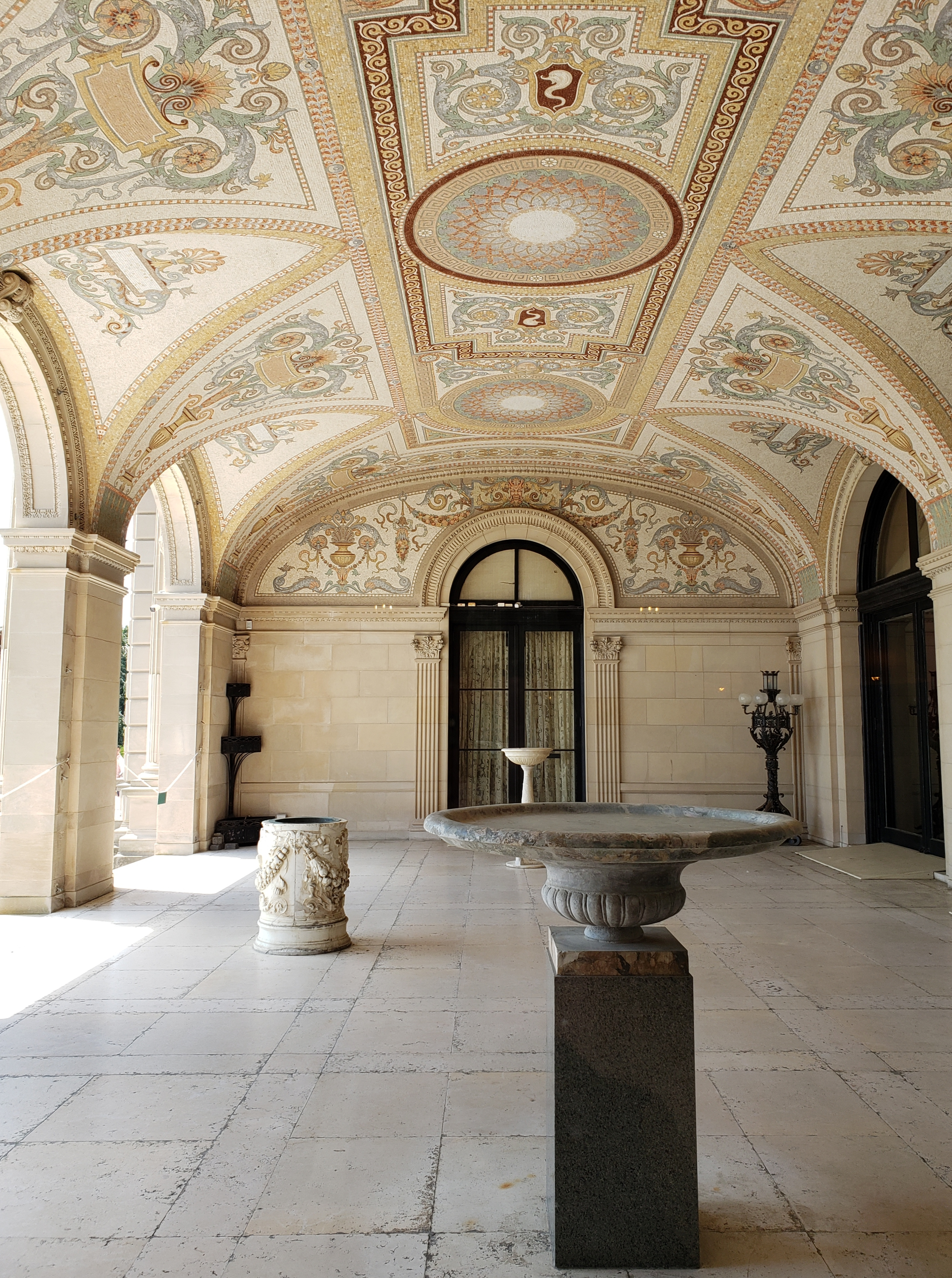
Terrace

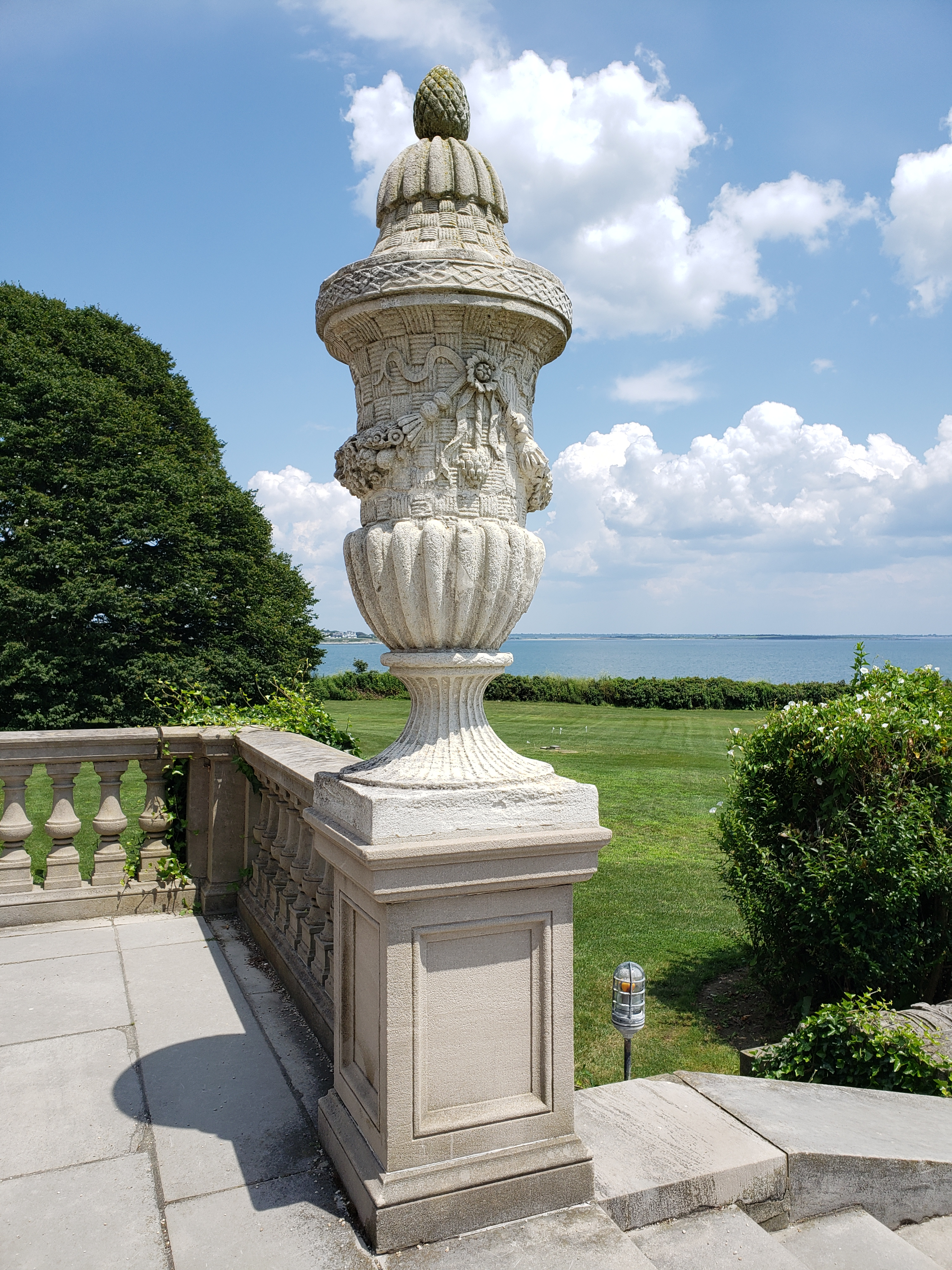
View of the sea

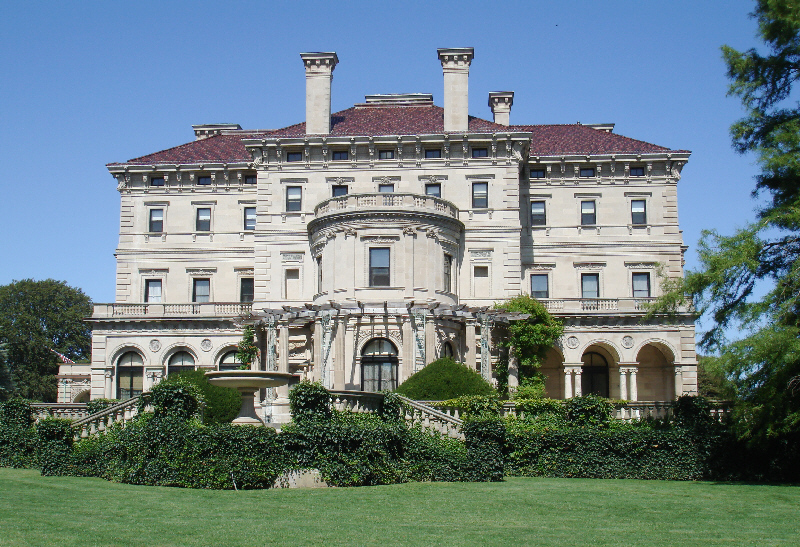
The Breakers side facade

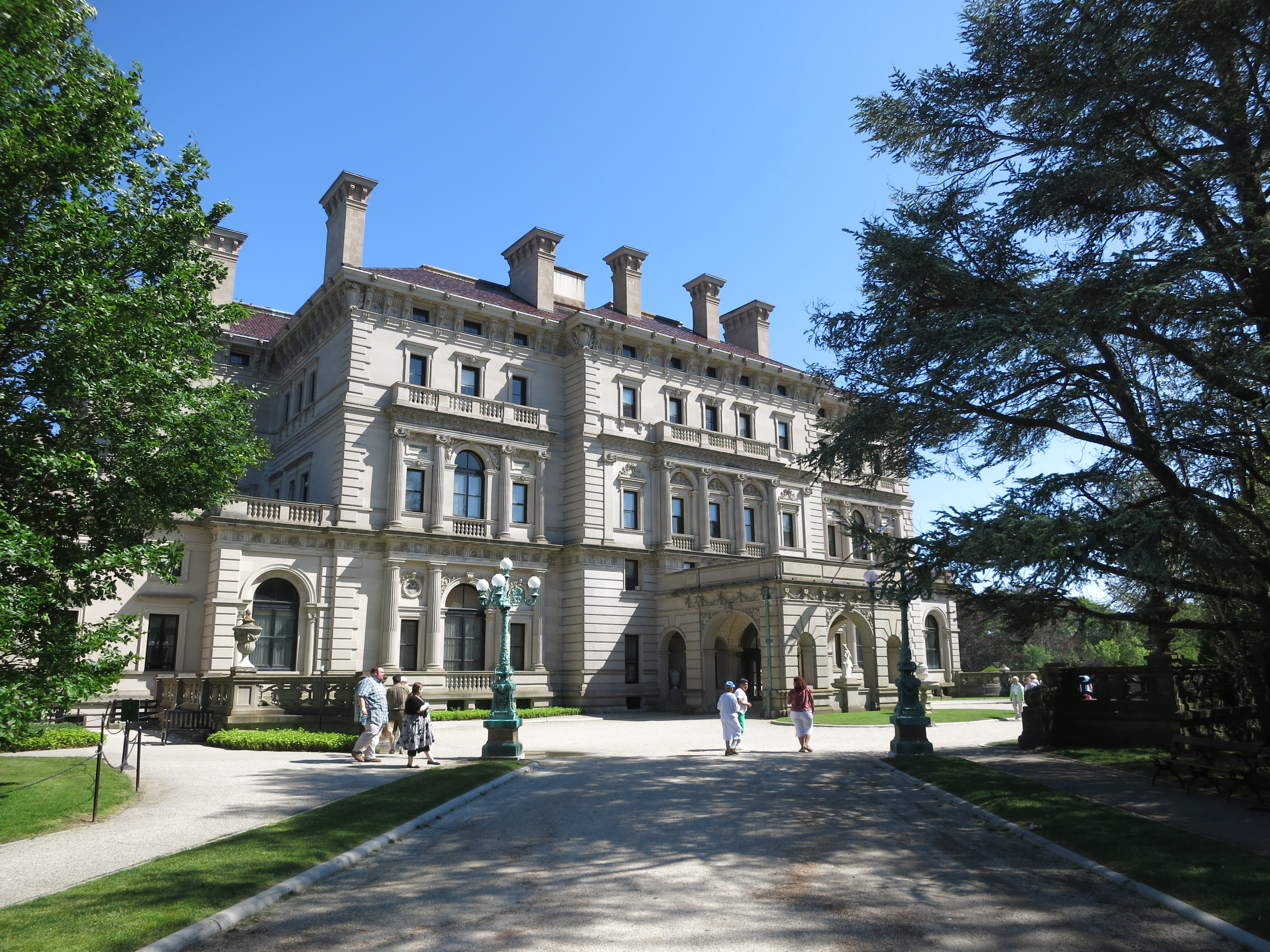
The Breakers other facade

== See also ==
- List of Gilded Age mansions
- List of largest houses in the United States
- List of National Historic Landmarks in Rhode Island
- National Register of Historic Places listings in Newport County, Rhode Island

== Notes ==
- Vanderbilt, Arthur T. (1989). Fortune's Children: The Fall of the House of Vanderbilt. Perennial.
