= Japanese yew =

Japanese yew may refer to:

- Taxus cuspidata, a species of yew native to Japan, Korea, and Manchuria and cultivated as an ornamental plant
- Podocarpus macrophyllus, a yew-like conifer native to southern Japan and southern and eastern China also cultivated as an ornamental plant
