= Magyarization =

Adoption of Hungarian culture or language by non-Hungarian people

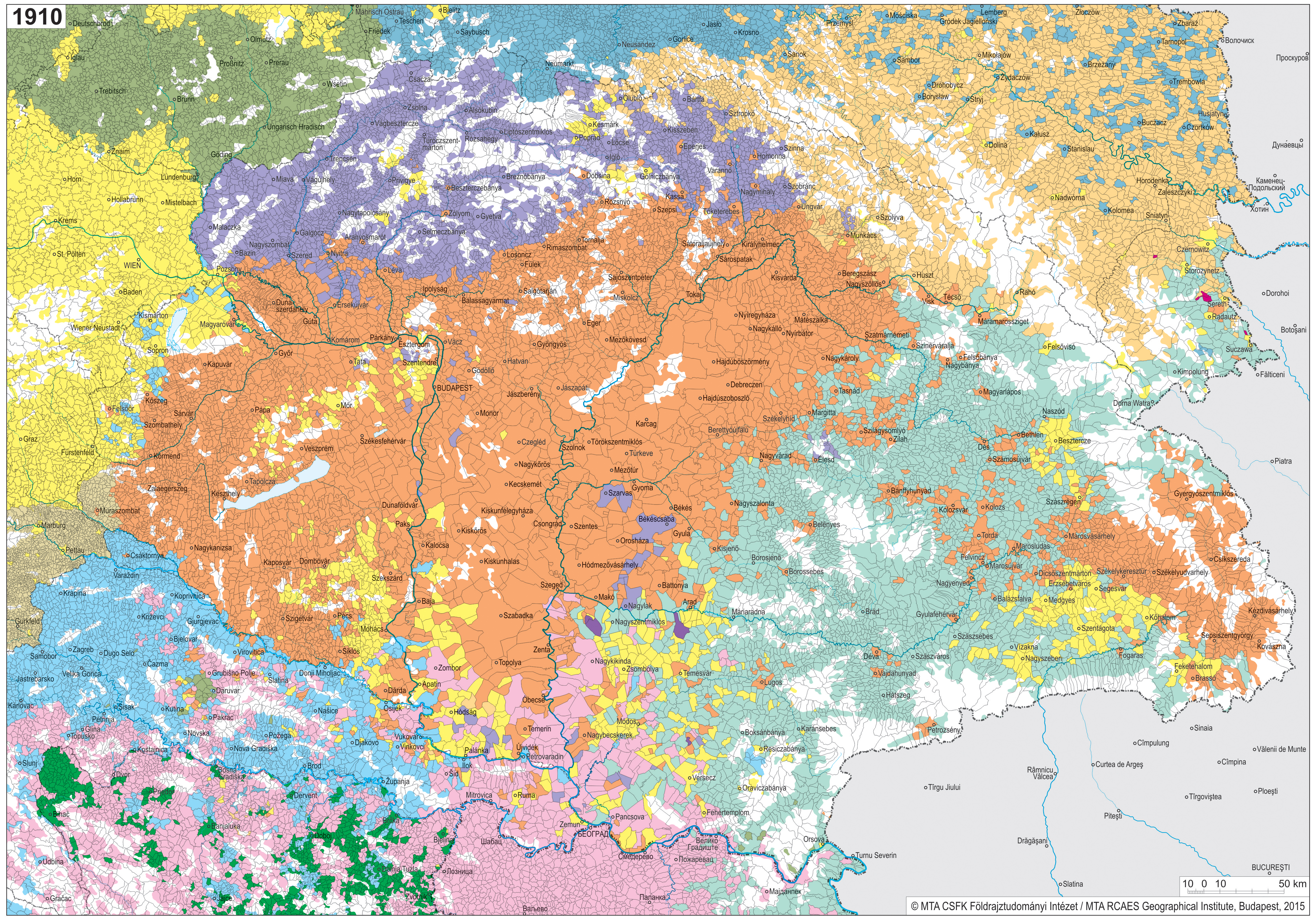
Ethnic map of the Kingdom of Hungary in 1910 (and the Carpatho-Pannonian area), based on the 1910 Austro-Hungarian census of Bosnia and Herzegovina, as well as the Hungarian, Austrian, and Serbian censuses. Hungarians Bosniaks Bulgarians Croats Czechs Germans Serbs Slovaks Slovenes Poles Romanians Russians Ruthenians Uninhabited

Magyarization (UK: /ˌmædʒəraɪˈzeɪʃən/ US: /ˌmɑːdʒərɪ-/, also Hungarianization; Hungarian: magyarosítás [ˈmɒɟɒroʃiːtaːʃ]), after "Magyar"—the Hungarian autonym—was an assimilation or acculturation process by which non-Hungarian nationals living in the Kingdom of Hungary, then part of the Austro-Hungarian Empire, adopted the Hungarian national identity and language in the period between the Compromise of 1867 and Austria-Hungary's dissolution in 1918. Magyarization occurred both voluntarily and as a result of social pressure, and was mandated in certain respects by specific government policies.

Before World War I, only three European countries declared ethnic minority rights, and enacted minority-protecting laws: the first was Hungary (1849 and 1868), the second was Austria (1867), and the third was Belgium (1898). In contrast, the legal systems of other pre-WW1 era European countries did not allow the use of European minority languages in primary schools, in cultural institutions, in offices of public administration and in the courts.

Hungarian nation-building in the 19th century was explicitly modeled after contemporary Western examples, viewing the ongoing linguistic integration enforced by the governments of Britain and France as the prime models for state stability. While proponents justified Magyarization by citing these successful Western precedents, they argued that Hungary's progress was less effective because it was hindered by legal protections for minority rights and the autonomy of minority churches — the Hungarian institutional barriers — that were absent in Britain and France, where the lack of similar constraints allowed for more rapid and comprehensive unification.

Magyarization was ideologically based on the classical liberal concepts of individualism (civil liberties of the person/citizens of the country rather than of nationalities/ethnic groups as communities) and civic nationalism, which encouraged ethnic minorities' cultural and linguistic assimilation.

By emphasizing minority rights and civil and political rights of the citizen/person based on individualism, Hungarian politicians sought to prevent establishment of politically autonomous territories for ethnic minorities. However, the leaders of the Romanian, Serb and Slovak minorities aspired to full territorial autonomy instead of linguistic and cultural minority rights. Hungarian politicians, influenced by their experience during the Hungarian Revolution of 1848, when many minorities supported the Habsburgs in opposition to Hungarian independence, and afraid of pan-slavic Russian Tsarist interventionism, viewed such autonomy as the dismemberment of Kingdom of Hungary.

Although the 1868 Hungarian Nationalities Law guaranteed legal equality to all citizens, including in language use, in this period practically only Hungarian was used in administrative, judicial, and higher educational contexts.

By 1900, Transleithanian state administration, businesses, and high society spoke Hungarian almost exclusively, and by 1910, 96% of civil servants, 91% of all public employees, 97% of judges and public prosecutors, 91% of secondary school teachers and 89% of medical doctors had learned Hungarian as their first language. Urban and industrial centers' Magyarization proceeded at a particularly quick rate; nearly all middle-class Jews and Germans and many middle-class Slovaks and Ruthenes spoke Hungarian. Overall, between 1880 and 1910, the percentage of the total population that spoke Hungarian as its first language rose from 46.6% to 54.5%. Most Magyarization occurred in central Hungary and among the educated middle classes, largely the result of urbanization and industrialization. It hardly touched rural, peasant, and peripheral populations; among these groups, linguistic frontiers did not shift significantly between 1800 and 1900.

Despite the often-touted 'Magyarization efforts', the 1910 census revealed that approximately 87% of the minorities in the Kingdom of Hungary (8,895,925 citizens) could not speak Hungarian at all."

While those nationalities who opposed Magyarization faced political and cultural challenges, these were less severe than the civic and fiscal mistreatment of minorities in some of Hungary’s neighboring countries during the interwar period. After the Treaty of Trianon, this mistreatment included prejudicial court proceedings, overtaxation, and biased application of social and economic legislation in those countries.

== Use of the term ==
Magyarization usually refers specifically to the policies that were enforced in Austro-Hungarian Transleithania in the 19th century and early 20th century, especially after the Compromise of 1867 and especially after Count Menyhért Lónyay's premiership beginning in 1871.

When referring to personal and geographic names, Magyarization refers to the replacement of a non-Hungarian name with a Hungarian one.

Magyarization was perceived by ethnic groups such as Romanians, Slovaks, Ruthenians (Rusyns), Croats, and Serbs as cultural aggression or active discrimination, especially in areas where national minorities formed the majority of the local population.

== Medieval antecedents ==
Although Latin was the official language of state administration, legislation, and schooling from 1000 to 1784, smaller ethnic groups assimilated into a common Hungarian culture throughout medieval Hungarian history. Even at the time of the Hungarian conquest, the Hungarian tribal alliance was made up of tribes from different ethnic backgrounds. The Kabars, for example, were of Turkic origin, as were later groups, such as the Pechenegs and Cumans, who settled in Hungary between the 9th and 13th centuries. Still-extant Turkic toponyms, such as Kunság (Cumania), reflect this history. The subjugated local population in the Carpathian Basin, mainly in the lowlands, also took on the Hungarian language and customs during the high medieval period.

Similarly, some historians claim that ancestors of the Szeklers (Transylvanian Hungarians) were Avars or Turkic Bulgars who began using the Hungarian language in the Middle Ages. Others argue the Szeklers descended from a Hungarian-speaking "Late Avar" population or from ethnic Hungarians who, after receiving unique settlement privileges, developed a distinct regional identity.

As a reward for their military achievements, the Hungarian crown granted titles of nobility to some Romanian knezes. Many of these nobles houses, such as the Drágffy (Drag, Drăgoștești), Kendeffy (Cândea, Cândești), Majláth (Mailat) or Jósika families, assimilated into the Hungarian nobility by taking on the Hungarian language and converting to Catholicism.

== Modern background ==
Although the Kingdom of Hungary had become an integral part of the House of Habsburg's Austrian Empire following the liberation of Buda in 1686, Latin remained the administrative language until 1784, and then again between 1790 and 1844. Emperor Joseph II influenced by Enlightenment absolutism, pushed for the replacement of Latin by German as the empire's official language during his reign (1780–1790). Many lesser Hungarian nobles perceived Joseph's language reform as German cultural hegemony, and they insisted on their right to use Hungarian. This sparked a national awakening of Hungarian language and culture which increased the political tensions between the Hungarian-speaking lesser houses and the germanophone and francophone magnates, fewer than half of whom were ethnic Magyars.

Magyarization as a social policy began in earnest in the 1830s, when Hungarian started replacing Latin and German in educational contexts. Although this phase of Magyarization lacked religious and ethnic elements—language use was the only issue, as it would be, just a few decades later, during tsarist Russification—it nonetheless caused tensions within the Hungarian ruling class. The liberal revolutionary Lajos Kossuth advocated rapid Magyarization, pleading in the early 1840s in the newspaper Pesti Hírlap, "Let us hurry, let us hurry to Magyarize the Croats, the Romanians, and the Saxons, for otherwise we shall perish." Kossuth stressed that Hungarian had to be the exclusive language in public life, writing in 1842 that "in one country it is impossible to speak in a hundred different languages. There must be one language, and in Hungary, this must be Hungarian."

However, moderate nationalists, who supported a compromise with Austria, were less enthusiastic. Zsigmond Kemény, for example, agitated for a Magyar-led multinational state and disapproved of Kossuth's assimilatory ambitions. István Széchenyi was also who more conciliatory toward ethnic minorities and criticized Kossuth for "pitting one nationality against another". While Széchenyi promoted Magyarization on the basis of the alleged "moral and intellectual supremacy" of Hungarian culture, he argued that Hungary had to first become worthy of emulation if Magyarization was to succeed. Kossuth's radical program gained more popular support than Széchenyi's. The nationalists thus initially supported the policy "One country – one language – one nation" during the Kossuth-led Revolution of 1848. Some minority nationalists, such as the Slovak nationalist author and activist Janko Kráľ, were imprisoned .

As the 1848 Revolution progressed, the Austrians gained the upper hand with the help of the Russian Imperial Army. This led the Hungarian revolutionary government to attempt negotiations with Hungary's ethnic minorities, who comprised up to 40% of its armed forces. (The Hungarian revolutionary army was a volunteer army) On 28 July 1849, the revolutionary parliament enacted minority rights legislation, one of the first in Europe. This was insufficient to turn the tide, and the Hungarian revolutionary volunteer army under Artúr Görgey surrendered in August 1849 after the Habsburgs gained the support of Nicholas I's Russia.

The Hungarian national awakening had the lasting effect of triggering similar national revivals among the Slovak, Romanian, Serbian, and Croatian minorities in Hungary and Transylvania, who felt threatened by both German and Hungarian cultural hegemony. These revivals would blossom into nationalist movements in the nineteenth and twentieth centuries and contribute to Austria-Hungary's collapse in 1918.

== Magyarization during Dualism ==
Time	Total population of the Kingdom of Hungary without Croatia	Percentage rate of Hungarians
900	c. 800,000	55–71%
1222	c. 2,000,000	70–80%
1370	2,500,000	60–70% (including Croatia)
1490	c. 3,500,000	80%
1699	c. 3,500,000	50–55%
1711	3,000,000	53%
1790	8,525,480	37.7%
1828	11,495,536	40–45%
1846	12,033,399	40–45%
1850	11,600,000	41.4%
1880	13,749,603	46%
1900	16,838,255	51.4%
1910	18,264,533	54.5% (including c. 5% Jews)

The term Magyarization is used in regards to the national policies put into use by the government of the Kingdom of Hungary, which was part of the Habsburg Empire. The beginning of this process dates to the 19th century and was intensified after the Austro-Hungarian Compromise of 1867, which increased the power of the Hungarian government within the newly formed Austria-Hungary. some of them had little desire to be declared a national minority like in other cultures. However, Jews in Hungary appreciated the emancipation in Hungary at a time when anti-semitic laws were still applied in Russia and Romania. Large minorities were concentrated in various regions of the kingdom, where they formed significant majorities. In Transylvania proper (1867 borders), the 1910 census finds 55.08% Romanian-speakers, 34.2% Hungarian-speakers, and 8.71% German-speakers. In the north of the Kingdom, Slovaks and Ruthenians formed an ethnic majority also, in the southern regions the majority were South Slavic Croats, Serbs and Slovenes and in the western regions the majority were Germans. The process of Magyarization did not succeed in imposing the Hungarian language as the most used language in all territories in the Kingdom of Hungary. In fact the profoundly multinational character of historic Transylvania was reflected in the fact that during the fifty years of the dual monarchy, the spread of Hungarian as the second language remained limited. In 1880, 5.7% of the non-Hungarian population, or 109,190 people, claimed to have a knowledge of the Hungarian language; the proportion rose to 11% (183,508) in 1900, and to 15.2% (266,863) in 1910. These figures reveal the reality of a bygone era, one in which millions of people could conduct their lives without speaking the state's official language. The policies of Magyarization aimed to have a Hungarian language surname as a requirement for access to basic government services such as local administration, education, and justice. Between 1850 and 1910 the ethnic Hungarian population increased by 106.7%, while the increase of other ethnic groups was far slower: Serbians and Croatians 38.2%, Romanians 31.4% and Slovaks 10.7%.

The Magyarization of Budapest was rapid and it implied not only the assimilation of the old inhabitants, but also the Magyarization of immigrants. In the capital of Hungary in 1850, 56% of the residents were Germans and only 33% Hungarians, but in 1910 almost 90% declared themselves Magyars. This evolution had beneficial influence on Hungarian culture and literature.

According to census data, the Hungarian population of Transylvania increased from 24.9% in 1869 to 31.6% in 1910. In the same time, the percentage of Romanian population decreased from 59.0% to 53.8% and the percentage of German population decreased from 11.9% to 10.7%. Changes were more significant in cities with predominantly German and Romanian population. For example, the percentage of Hungarian population increased in Braşov from 13.4% in 1850 to 43.43% in 1910, meanwhile the Romanian population decreased from 40% to 28.71% and the German population from 40.8% to 26.41%.

=== State policy ===
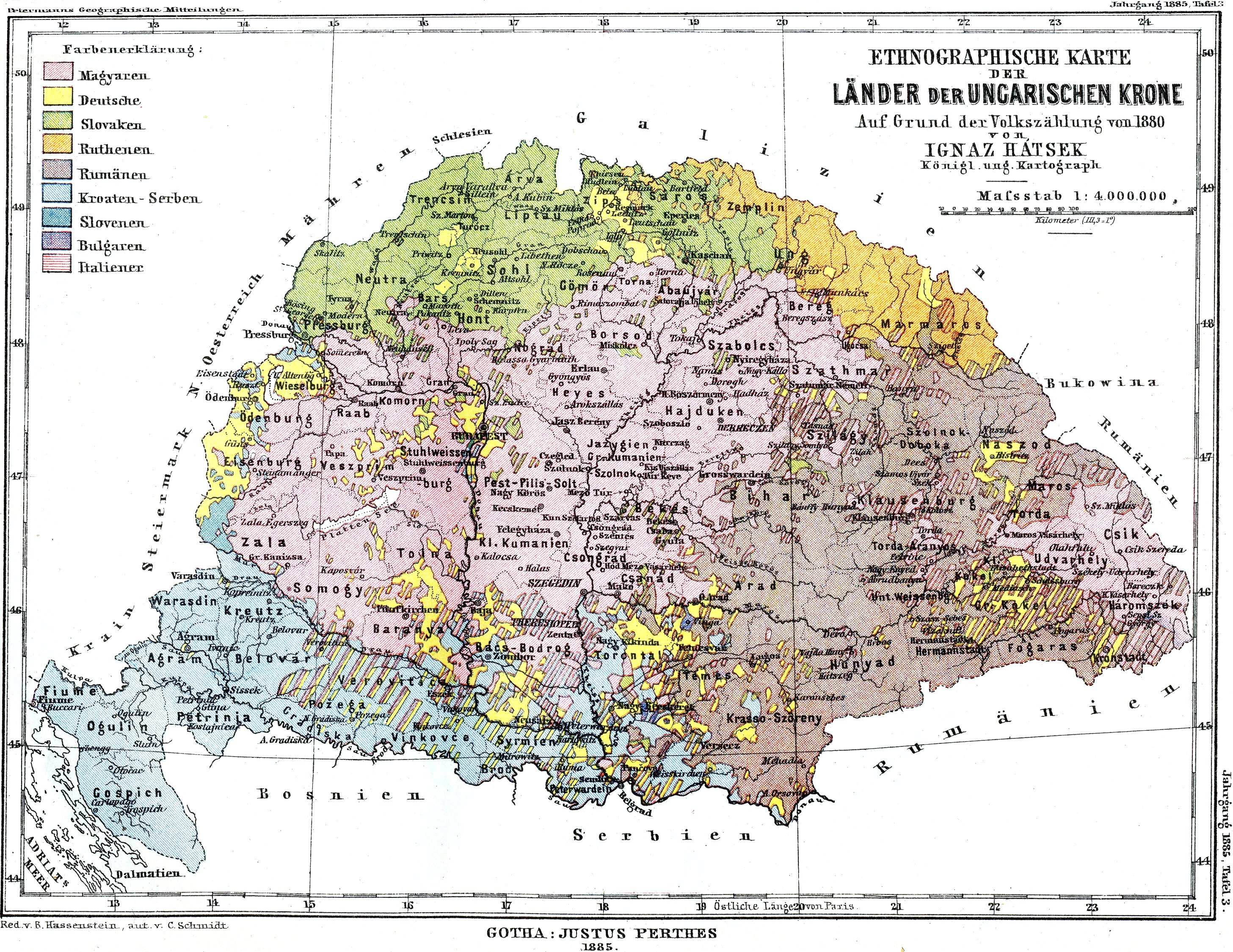
Distribution of nationalities within the Kingdom of Hungary, according to the 1880 census (based on mother tongue interpreted as the language one was most comfortable using)

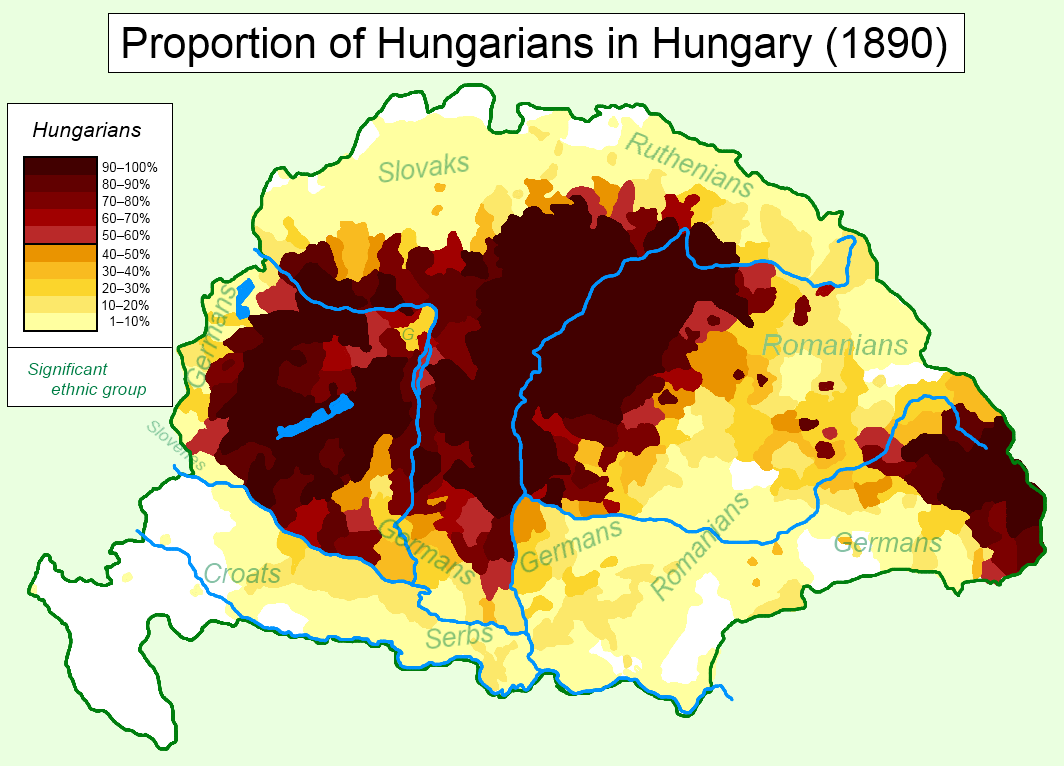
1890 census data of the prevalence of the use of Hungarian as a first language in Transleithania

The first Hungarian government after the Austro-Hungarian Compromise of 1867, the 1867–1871 liberal government led by Count Gyula Andrássy and sustained by Ferenc Deák and his followers, passed the 1868 Nationality Act, that declared "all citizens of Hungary form, politically, one nation, the indivisible unitary Hungarian political nation ( politikai nemzet), of which every citizen of the country, whatever his personal nationality (nemzetiség), is a member equal in rights." The Education Act, passed the same year, shared this view as the Magyars simply being primus inter pares ("first among equals"). At this time ethnic minorities de jure had a great deal of cultural and linguistic autonomy, including in education, religion, and local government.

However, after education minister Baron József Eötvös died in 1871, and in Andrássy became imperial foreign minister, Deák withdrew from active politics and Menyhért Lónyay was appointed prime minister of Hungary. He became steadily more allied with the Magyar gentry, and the notion of a Hungarian political nation increasingly became one of a Magyar nation. "[A]ny political or social movement which challenged the hegemonic position of the leading role of Hungarians was liable to be repressed or charged with 'treason'..., 'libel' or 'incitement of ethnic hatred'. This was to be the fate of various Slovak, South Slav [e.g. Serb], Romanian and Ruthene cultural societies and nationalist parties from 1876 onward". All of this only intensified after 1875, with the rise of Kálmán Tisza, who as minister of the Interior had ordered the closing of Matica slovenská on 6 April 1875. Until 1890, Tisza, when he served as prime minister, brought the Slovaks many other measures which prevented them from keeping pace with the progress of other European nations.

For a long time, the number of non-Hungarians that lived in the Kingdom of Hungary was much larger than the number of ethnic Hungarians. According to the 1787 data, the population of the Kingdom of Hungary numbered 2,322,000 Hungarians (29%) and 5,681,000 non-Hungarians (71%). In 1809, the population numbered 3,000,000 Hungarians (30%) and 7,000,000 non-Hungarians (70%). An increasingly intense Magyarization policy was implemented after 1867.

Although in Slovak, Romanian and Serbian historiography, administrative and often repressive Magyarization is usually singled out as the main factor accountable for the dramatic change in the ethnic composition of the Kingdom of Hungary in the 19th century, spontaneous assimilation was also an important factor. In this regard, it must be pointed out that large territories of central and southern Kingdom of Hungary lost their previous, predominantly Magyar population during the numerous wars fought by the Habsburg and Ottoman empires in the 16th and 17th centuries. These empty lands were repopulated, by administrative measures adopted by the Vienna Court especially during the 18th century, by Hungarians and Slovaks from the northern part of the Kingdom that avoided the devastation (see also Royal Hungary), Swabians, Serbs (Serbs were the majority group in most southern parts of the Pannonian Plain during Ottoman rule, i.e. before those Habsburg administrative measures), Croats and Romanians. Various ethnic groups lived side by side (this ethnic heterogeneity is preserved until today in certain parts of Vojvodina, Bačka and Banat). After 1867, Hungarian became the lingua franca on this territory in the interaction between ethnic communities, and individuals who were born in mixed marriages between two non-Magyars often grew a full-fledged allegiance to the Hungarian nation. Of course since Latin was the official language until 1844 and the country was directly governed from Vienna (which excluded any large-scale governmental assimilation policy from the Hungarian side before the Austro-Hungarian Compromise of 1867), the factor of spontaneous assimilation should be given due weight in any analysis relating to the demographic tendencies of the Kingdom of Hungary in the 19th century.

The other key factor in mass ethnic changes is that between 1880 and 1910 about 3 million people from Austria-Hungary migrated to the United States alone. More than half of them were from Hungary (at least 1.5 million or about 10% of the total population) alone. Besides the 1.5 million that migrated to the US (two thirds of them or about a million were ethnically non-Hungarians) mainly Romanians and Serbs had migrated to their newly established mother states in large numbers, like the Principality of Serbia or the Kingdom of Romania, who proclaimed their independence in 1878. Amongst them were such noted people as the early aviator Aurel Vlaicu (represented on the 50 Romanian lei banknote), writer Liviu Rebreanu (first illegally in 1909, then legally in 1911), and Ion Ivanovici. Many also migrated to Western Europe and other

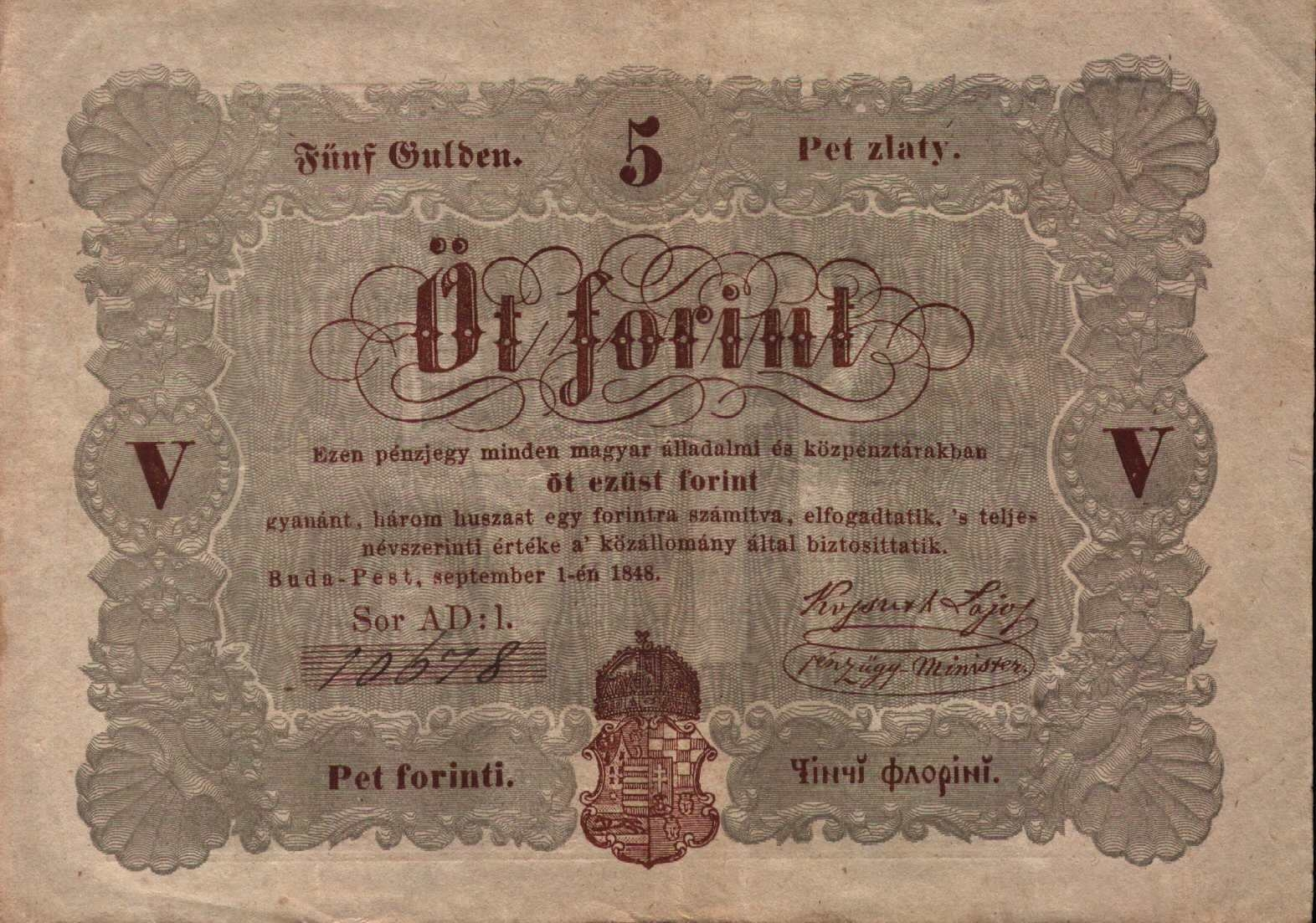
During the 1848–1849 Hungarian Revolution War, Hungarian money called the "Kossuth banknote", with inscriptions in Hungarian and the languages of the nationalities on it: German, Slovak, Croatian, and Romanian.

parts of the Americas.

=== Allegation of violent oppression ===
Many Slovak intellectuals and activists (such as national activist Janko Kráľ who started a peasant's revolt) were imprisoned or even sentenced to death for high treason during the Hungarian Revolution of 1848. One of the incidents that shocked European public opinion was the Černová (Csernova) massacre in which 15 people were killed and 52 injured in 1907. The massacre caused the Kingdom of Hungary to lose prestige in the eyes of the world when the English historian Robert William Seton-Watson, the Norwegian writer Bjørnstjerne Bjørnson and the Russian writer Leo Tolstoy championed this cause. The case being a proof for the violence of Magyarization is disputed, partly because the sergeant who ordered the shooting and all the shooters were ethnic Slovaks and partly because of the controversial figure of Andrej Hlinka.

The writers who condemned forced Magyarization in printed publications were likely to be put in jail either on charges of treason or for incitement of ethnic hatred.

=== Education ===
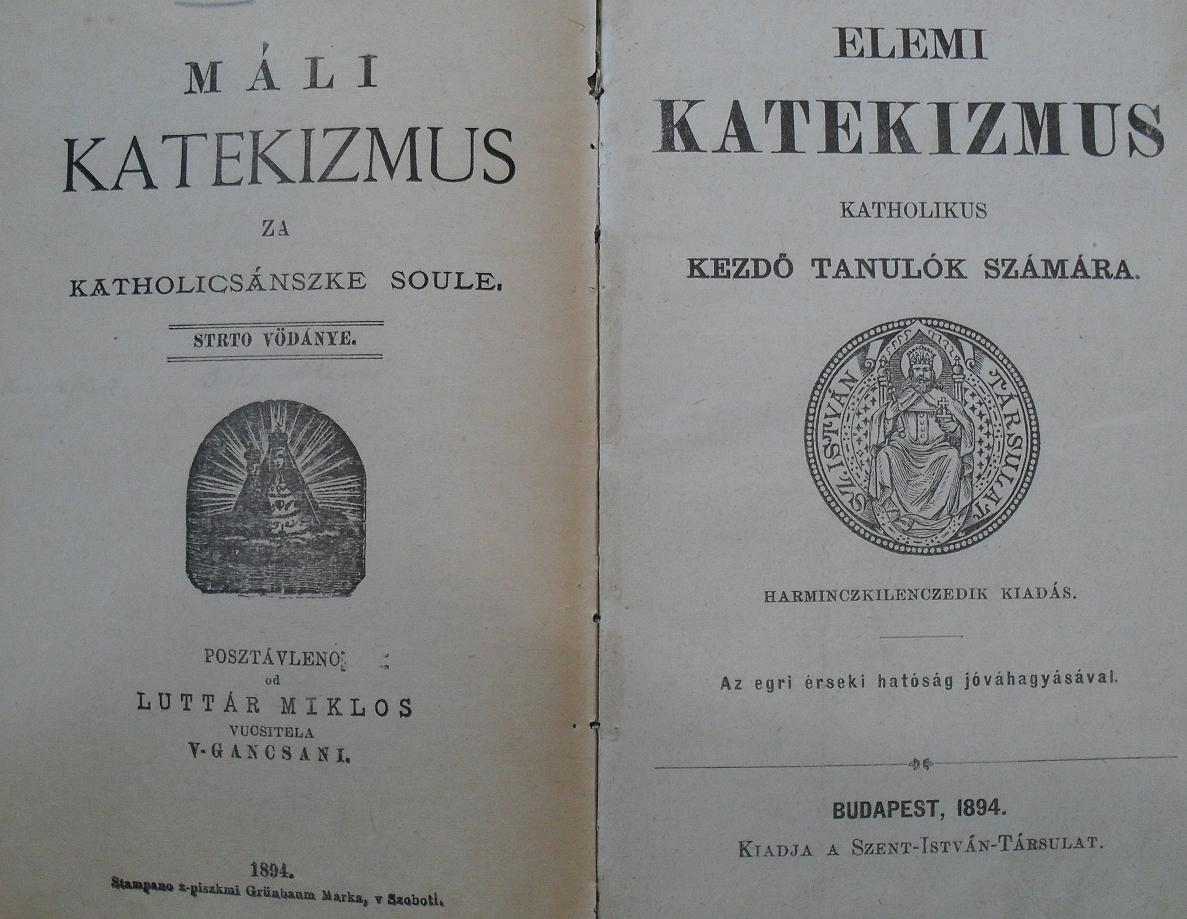
Bilingual catechism textbook from 1894

The Hungarian secondary school is like a huge machine, at one end of which the Slovak youths are thrown in by the hundreds, and at the other end of which they come out as Magyars.

— Béla Grünwald, adviser to Count Kálmán Tisza, Hungarian prime minister from 1875 to 1890

Schools funded by churches and communes had the right to provide education in minority languages. These church-funded schools, however, were mostly founded before 1867, that is, in different socio-political circumstances. In practice, the majority of students in commune-funded schools who were native speakers of minority languages were often instructed in Hungarian.

Beginning with the 1879 Primary Education Act and the 1883 Secondary Education Act, the Hungarian state made more efforts to reduce the use of non-Magyar languages, in strong violation of the 1868 Nationalities Law.

In about 61% of these schools the language used was exclusively Magyar, in about 20% it was mixed, and in the remainder some non-Magyar language was used.

The ratio of minority-language schools was steadily decreasing: in the period between 1880 and 1913, when the ratio of Hungarian-only schools almost doubled, the ratio of minority language-schools almost halved. Nonetheless, Transylvanian Romanians had more Romanian-language schools under the Austro-Hungarian Empire rule than there were in the Romanian Kingdom itself. Thus, for example, in 1880, in Austro-Hungarian Empire there were 2,756 schools teaching exclusively in the Romanian language, while in the Kingdom of Romania there were only 2,505 (the Romanian Kingdom gained its independence from the Ottoman Empire only two years before, in 1878). The process of Magyarization culminated in 1907 with the lex Apponyi (named after education minister Albert Apponyi) which expected all primary school children to read, write and count in Hungarian for the first four years of their education. From 1909 religion also had to be taught in Hungarian. "In 1902 there were in Hungary 18,729 elementary schools with 32,020 teachers, attended by 2,573,377 pupils, figures which compare favourably with those of 1877, when there were 15,486 schools with 20,717 teachers, attended by 1,559,636 pupils. In about 61% of these schools the language used was exclusively Magyar". Approximately 600 Romanian villages were depleted of proper schooling due to the laws. As of 1917, 2,975 primary schools in Romania were closed as a result due to the wartime.

The effect of Magyarization on the education system in Hungary was very significant, as can be seen from the official statistics submitted by the Hungarian government to the Paris Peace Conference (formally, all the Jewish people who spoke Hungarian as first language in the kingdom were automatically considered Hungarians, a sentiment supported by many of them, who had a magnitude higher rate of tertiary education than the Christian populations).

By 1910 about 900,000 religious Jews made up approximately 5% of the population of Hungary and about 23% of Budapest's citizenry. They accounted for 20% of all general grammar school students, and 37% of all commercial scientific grammar school students, 31.9% of all engineering students, and 34.1% of all students in human faculties of the universities. Jews were accounted for 48.5% of all physicians, and 49.4% of all lawyers/jurists in Hungary.

Literacy in Kingdom of Hungary, incl. male and female
Major nationalities in Hungary	Rate of literacy in 1910
German	70.7%
Hungarian	67.1%
Croatian	62.5%
Slovak	58.1%
Serbian	51.3%
Romanian	28.2%
Ruthenian	22.2%

	Hungarian	Romanian	Slovak	German	Serbian	Ruthenian
% of total population	54.5%	16.1%	10.7%	10.4%	2.5%	2.5%
Kindergartens	2,219	4	1	18	22	-
Elementary schools	14,014	2,578	322	417	n/a	47
Junior high schools	652	4	-	6	3	-
Science high schools	33	1	-	2	-	-
Teachers' colleges	83	12	-	2	1	-
Gymnasiums for boys	172	5	-	7	1	-
High schools for girls	50	-	-	1	-	-
Trade schools	105	-	-	-	-	-
Commercial schools	65	1	-	-	-	-

Source: Paclisanu 1985

=== Election system ===
Officially, Hungarian electoral laws never contained any legal discrimination based on nationality or mother tongue. The Hungarian electoral system was neither fully democratic nor egalitarian. Voting rights were tied to a complex matrix of tax payments, property ownership and level of education. Only around 6% of the population had the right to vote in parliamentary elections.

Electoral laws based on such high census were very common in Western European countries until the turn of the 20th century but later the countries of Western Europe gradually lowered the requirements for suffrage rights, and finally - after WW I - they abolished their census suffrage, and introduced the general suffrage right.

The ratio of franchise among ethnicities in Hungary proper (Not including Croatia)
Major nationalities	Ratio of nationalities	Ratio of franchise
Hungarians	54.4%	56.2%
Romanians	16.1%	11.2%
Slovaks	10.7%	11.4%
Germans	10.4%	12.7%
Ruthenians	2.5%	2.9%
Serbs	2.5%	2.5%
Croats	1.1%	1.2%
Other smaller groups	2.3%	

The Austro-Hungarian compromise and its supporting Liberal Party remained bitterly unpopular among the ethnic Hungarian voters, and the continuous successes of the pro-compromise Liberal Party in the Hungarian parliamentary elections caused long lasting frustration among ethnic Hungarian voters. The ethnic minorities had the key role in the political maintenance of the compromise in Hungary, because they were able to vote the pro-compromise Liberal Party into the position of the majority/ruling parties of the Hungarian parliament. The pro-compromise liberal parties were the most popular among ethnic minority voters, however i.e. the Slovak, Serb and Romanian minority parties remained unpopular among their own ethnic minority voters. On the other hand, coalitions formed by Hungarian nationalist parties—which enjoyed overwhelming support from ethnic Hungarian voters—consistently found themselves in the opposition. There was a brief exception during the period of 1906 to 1910, when the coalition of Hungarian-supported nationalist parties was able to form a government.

The districts that predominantly supported the government were chiefly situated in regions inhabited by ethnic minorities, whereas opposition strongholds were found in areas with a Hungarian majority. To secure the ruling party's success, the districts in minority regions were delineated to be smaller than those in Hungarian-majority regions. This strategy enabled the election of a greater number of representatives from minority dominated districts to parliament, which further shrunk the value of votes in ethnic Hungarian territories. Consequently, the Liberal Party was able to sustain its parliamentary majority for an extended period with considerable success.

The census system of the post-1867 Kingdom of Hungary was unfavourable to many of the non-Hungarian nationality, especially for Romanian minority because franchise was based on the income tax of the person. According to the 1874 election law, which remained unchanged until 1918, only the upper 5.9% to 6.5% of the whole population had voting rights. That effectively excluded almost the whole of the peasantry and the working class from Hungarian political life. The percentage of those on low incomes was higher among other nationalities than among the Magyars, with the exception of Germans and Jews who were generally richer than Hungarians, thus proportionally they had a much higher ratio of voters than the Hungarians. From a Hungarian point of view, the structure of the settlement system was based on differences in earning potential and wages. The Hungarians and Germans were much more urbanised than Slovaks, Romanians and Serbs in the Kingdom of Hungary.

In 1900, nearly a third of the deputies were elected by fewer than 100 votes, and close to two-thirds were elected by fewer than 1000 votes. Due to economic reasons Transylvania had an even worse representation: the more Romanian a county was, the fewer voters it had. Out of the Transylvanian deputies sent to Budapest, 35 represented the 4 mostly Hungarian counties and the major towns (which together formed 20% of the population), whereas only 30 deputies represented the other 72% of the population, which was predominantly Romanian.

In 1913, even the electorate that elected only one-third of the deputies had a non-proportional ethnic composition. The Magyars who made up 54.5% of the population of the Kingdom of Hungary represented a 60.2% majority of the electorate. Ethnic Germans made up 10.4% of the population and 13.0% of the electorate. The participation of other ethnic groups was as follows: Slovaks (10.7% in population, 10.4% in the electorate), Romanians (16.1% in population, 9.9% in the electorate), Rusyns (2.5% in population, 1.7% in the electorate), Croats (1.1% in population, 1.0% in the electorate), Serbs (2.2% in population, 1.4% in the electorate), and others (2.2% in population, 1.4% in the electorate). There is no data about the voting rights of the Jewish people, because they were counted automatically as Hungarians, due to their Hungarian mother tongue. People of Jewish origin were disproportionately represented among the businessmen and intellectuals in the country, thus making the ratio of Hungarian voters much higher.

Slovak national interests were represented by the Slovak National Party (SNS) which was the main force in the fight for the emancipation of Slovaks and their main representative in establishing contacts with Romanians, Serbians and Czechs. The Hungarian government, however, did not recognize any of them as official representatives for the non-Hungarian nationalities. Pressure from the Hungarian government and irregularities at elections caused these parties to declare electoral passivity, such as in the years 1884–1901, when the SNS boycotted the election. Elections were public, voters had to say aloud who they were voting for to the electoral commission. This allowed Hungarian authorities to enact pressure on voters including the intervention of the armed forces and the persecution of Slovak candidates and their voters.

=== The Magyarization of personal names ===
The Hungarianization of names occurred mostly in bigger towns and cities, mostly in Budapest, in Hungarian majority regions like Southern Transdanubia, Danube–Tisza Interfluve (the territory between the Danube and Tisza rivers), and Tiszántúl, however the change of names in Upper Hungary (today mostly Slovakia) or Transylvania (now in Romania) remained a marginal phenomenon.

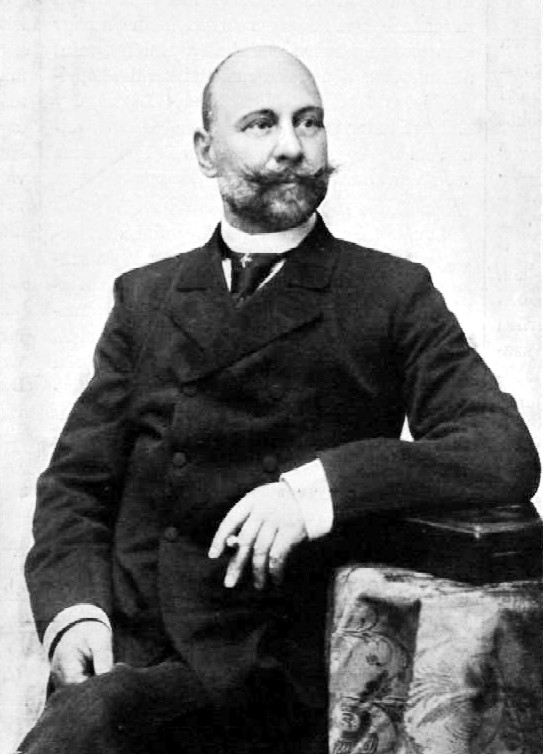
Prime Minister Dezső Bánffy (1895–1899), strong supporter of Magyarization

Hungarian authorities put constant pressure upon all non-Hungarians to Magyarize their names and the ease with which this could be done gave rise to the nickname of Crown Magyars (the price of registration being one korona). A private non-governmental civil organization "Central Society for Name Magyarization" (Központi Névmagyarositó Társaság) was founded in 1881 in Budapest. The aim of this private society was to provide advice and guidelines for those who wanted to Magyarize their surnames. Simon Telkes became the chairman of the society, and professed that "one can achieve being accepted as a true son of the nation by adopting a national name". The society began an advertising campaign in the newspapers and sent out circular letters. They also made a proposal to lower the fees for changing one's name. The proposal was accepted by the Parliament and the fee was lowered from 5 forints to 50 krajcárs. After this the name changes peaked in 1881 and 1882 (with 1261 and 1065 registered name changes), and continued in the following years at an average of 750–850 per year. During the Bánffy administration there was another increase, reaching a maximum of 6,700 applications in 1897, mostly due to pressure from authorities and employers in the government sector. Statistics show that between 1881 and 1905 alone, 42,437 surnames were Magyarized, although this represented less than 0.5% of the total non-Hungarian population of the Kingdom of Hungary.

According to Hungarian statistics 340,000–350,000 names were Magyarised between 1815 and 1944; this happened mainly inside the Hungarian-speaking area. One Jewish name out of 17 was Magyarised, in comparison with other nationalities: one out of 139 (German Catholic), 427 (German Lutheran), 170 (Slovak Catholic), 330 (Slovak Lutheran).

The attempts to assimilate the Carpatho-Rusyns started in the late 18th century, but their intensity grew considerably after 1867. The agents of forced Magyarization endeavored to rewrite the history of the Carpatho-Rusyns with the purpose of subordinating them to Magyars by eliminating their own national and religious identity. Carpatho-Rusyns were pressed to add Western Rite practices to their Eastern Christian traditions and efforts were made to replace the Slavonic liturgical language with Hungarian.

=== Multi ethnic political elits ===
The Hungarian political elite during the Dual Monarchy was characterized by a high degree of integration of individuals from diverse ethnic backgrounds (Germanic, Slavic, and others).

These examples demonstrate that 'Magyarization' of surnames was not a prerequisite for achieving even the high-ranking positions in public administration and judicature or reaching the pinnacle of a political career (ministers or prime minister) in Kingdom of Hungary. These influential figures served the state under their ancestral names, reflecting the multicultural roots of the country's historical elite.

The following list highlights Hungarian government ministers of various ethnic backgrounds (Slavic, Germanic, and others) who retained their original family names throughout their political careers.

These success stories communicated that ethnic origin was not determinant factor: individuals who spoke fluent Hungarian and remained loyal to the state ideal, could attain positions of power within the Kingdom of Hungary, even at its highest levels. This promise of meritocracy acted as a powerful magnet for minority intellectuals, showing that the path to the summit of power was open to anyone who embraced the Hungarian state ideal.

Ministers of Education and Culture
Tivadar Pauler (1871–1872);
József Szlávy (1871);
Ágoston Trefort (1872–1888);
Gyula Wlassics (1895–1903);
Albert Berzeviczy (1903–1905);
István Haller (1919–1920);
Kuno Klebelsberg (1922–1931);
Bálint Hóman (1932–1938, 1939–1942);
Ferenc Rajniss (1944–1945);

Ministers of Defence / War
Lajos Aulich (1849);
Sándor Wekerle (1906);
Béla Linder (1918);
Ferenc Schnetzer (1919);
István Friedrich (1919–1920);
István Sréter (1920);
Sándor Belitska (1920–1923);
Vilmos Rőder (1936–1938);

Ministers of Justice
Sebő Vukovics (1849);
Tivadar Pauler (1872–1875, 1878–1886);
Béla Perczel (1875–1878);
Teofil Fabiny (1886–1889);
Antal Günther (1907–1909);
Sándor Wekerle (1917–1918);
Gyula Ferdinandy (1920);
Gábor Vladár (1944);
Ágoston Valentiny (1944–1945);
István Ries (1945–1950);

Ministers of Interior
Béla Wenckheim (1867–1869, 1875, 1878–1879);
Pál Rajner (1869–1871);
Károly Hieronymi (1892–1895);
Gábor Ugron (1917–1918);
Sándor Wekerle (1918);
Ödön Beniczky (1919–1920);
Sándor Semadam (1920);
Gyula Ferdinandy (1920–1921);
Kuno Klebelsberg (1921–1922);
Iván Rakovszky (1922–1926);
Béla Scitovszky (1926–1931);
Ferenc Keresztes-Fischer (1931–1935, 1938–1944);
Andor Jaross (1944);

Ministers of Finance
Ferenc Duschek (1849);
József Szlávy (1873–1874);
János Teleszky (1912–1917);
Sándor Wekerle (1889–1895, 1906–1910, 1917–1918);
Gusztáv Gratz (1917);
Gyula Peidl (1919);
János Grünn (1919);
Lajos Walko (1922–1924);
János Bud (1924–1928);
Lajos Reményi-Schneller (1938–1945);

Foreign Ministers / Ministers beside the King
József Somssich (1919–1920);
Gusztáv Gratz (1921);
Béla Wenckheim (1871–1879);
Lajos Walko (1925–1930, 1931–1932);
Ervin Roszner (1915–1917);

Ministers of Agriculture
Gábor Klauzál (1848);
István Gorove (1867–1870);
Ágoston Trefort (1876–1878);
Károly Vántus (1919);
Gyula Rubinek (1919–1920, 1920–1921);
János Mayer (1921, 1922–1924, 1924–1931);
Sándor Sztranyavszky (1938);
Béla Jurcsek (1944);

Ministers of Commerce

Károly Hieronymi (1903–1905, 1910–1911);
István Friedrich (1919);
Gyula Rubinek (1920);
János Bud (1929–1931);

=== The Magyarization of place names ===
Together with Magyarization of personal names and surnames, the exclusive use of the Hungarian forms of place names, instead of multilingual usage, was also common. For those places that had not been known under Hungarian names in the past, new Hungarian names were invented and used in administration instead of the former original non-Hungarian names. Examples of places where non-Hungarian origin names were replaced with newly invented Hungarian names are: Szvidnik – Felsővízköz (in Slovak Svidník, now Slovakia), Sztarcsova – Tárcsó (in Serbian Starčevo, now Serbia), or Lyutta – Havasköz (in Ruthenian Lyuta, now Ukraine).

The same can be said the successor states. For example Kövecses became Štrkovec, Zsigárd became Žigard, Nemeshódos became Vydrany, Magyarbél became Maďarský Bél, Nagymegyer became Čalovo, Harkács became Hrkáč, Feled became Jesenské, Párkány became Párkány Štúrovo (after Slovak politician Ľudovít Štúr) and none of these had a Slovak name. In Romania Kisbábony was changed to Băbești, Szalárd to Sălard Aknasugatag to Ocna Şugatag, Bácsiláz to Lazu Baciului, Barcánfalva to Bîrsana and Farkasrév to Vadu Izei. In Transcarpathia names were changed from Baranka to Бронька, Gernyés to Копашневo and so on.

On the first place the former official name used in Hungarian is given, on the second the new name and on the third place the name as it was restored after 1918 with the proper orthography of the given language.

== Emigration ==
During the dualism era, there was an internal migration of segments of the ethnically non-Hungarian population to the Kingdom of Hungary's central predominantly Hungarian counties and to Budapest where they assimilated. The ratio of ethnically non-Hungarian population in the Kingdom was also dropping due to their overrepresentation among the migrants to foreign countries, mainly to the United States. Hungarians, the largest ethnic group in the Kingdom representing 45.5% of the population in 1900, accounted for only 26.2% of the emigrants, while non-Hungarians (54.5%) accounted for 72% from 1901 to 1913. The areas with the highest emigration were the northern mostly Slovak inhabited counties of Sáros, Szepes, Zemlén, and from Ung county where a substantial Rusyn population lived. In the next tier were some of the southern counties including Bács-Bodrog, Torontál, Temes, and Krassó-Szörény largely inhabited by Serbs, Romanians, and Germans, as well as the northern mostly Slovak counties of Árva and Gömör-Kishont, and the central Hungarian inhabited county of Veszprém. The reasons for emigration were mostly economic. Additionally, some may have wanted to avoid Magyarization or the draft, but direct evidence of other than economic motivation among the emigrants themselves is limited. The Kingdom's administration welcomed the development as yet another instrument of increasing the ratio of ethnic Hungarians at home.

By 1914, a total number of 3 million had emigrated from the whole Austro-Hungarian Empire, of whom about 25% returned. This process of returning was halted by World War I and the dissolution of Austria-Hungary. The majority of the emigrants came from the most indigent social groups, especially from the agrarian sector. Magyarization did not cease after the collapse of Austria-Hungary but has continued within the borders of the post-WW-I Hungary throughout most of the 20th century and resulted in high decrease of numbers of ethnic Non-Hungarians.

== Jews ==
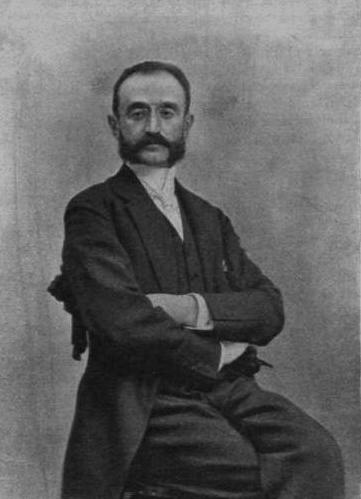
Sándor Hatvany-Deutsch, a Jewish entrepreneur, who was created baron by King Francis Joseph I in 1908

In the nineteenth century, the Neolog Jews were located mainly in the cities and larger towns. They arose in the environment of the latter period of the Austro-Hungarian Empire—generally a good period for upwardly mobile Jews, especially those of modernizing inclinations. In the Hungarian portion of the Empire, most Jews (nearly all Neologs and even most of the Orthodox) adopted the Hungarian language as their primary language and viewed themselves as "Magyars of the Jewish persuasion". The Jewish minority which to the extent it is attracted to a secular culture is usually attracted to the secular culture in power, was inclined to gravitate toward the cultural orientation of Budapest. (The same factor prompted Prague Jews to adopt an Austrian cultural orientation, and at least some Vilna Jews to adopt a Russian orientation.)

After the emancipation of Jews in 1867, the Jewish population of the Kingdom of Hungary (as well as the ascending German population) actively embraced Magyarization, because they saw it as an opportunity for assimilation without conceding their religion. (In the case of the Jewish people that process had been preceded by a process of Germanization earlier performed by Habsburg rulers). Stephen Roth writes, "Hungarian Jews were opposed to Zionism because they hoped that somehow they could achieve equality with other Hungarian citizens, not just in law but in fact, and that they could be integrated into the country as Hungarian Israelites. The word 'Israelite' (Hungarian: Izraelita) denoted only religious affiliation and was free from the ethnic or national connotations usually attached to the term 'Jew'. Hungarian Jews attained remarkable achievements in business, culture and less frequently even in politics. By 1910 about 900,000 religious Jews made up approximately 5% of the population of Hungary and about 23% of Budapest's citizenry. Jews accounted for 54% of commercial business owners, 85% of financial institution directors and owners in banking, and 62% of all employees in commerce, 20% of all general grammar school students, and 37% of all commercial scientific grammar school students, 31.9% of all engineering students, and 34.1% of all students in human faculties of the universities. Jews were accounted for 48.5% of all physicians, and 49.4% of all lawyers/jurists in Hungary. During the cabinet of pm. István Tisza three Jewish men were appointed as ministers. The first was Samu Hazai (Minister of War), János Harkányi (Minister of Trade) and János Teleszky (Minister of Finance).

While the Jewish population of the lands of the Dual Monarchy was about five percent, Jews made up nearly eighteen percent of the reserve officer corps. Thanks to the modernity of the constitution and to the benevolence of emperor Franz Joseph, the Austrian Jews came to regard the era of Austria-Hungary as a golden era of their history.

But even the most successful Jews were not fully accepted by the majority of the Magyars as one of their kind—as the events following the Nazi German invasion of the country in World War II "so tragically demonstrated."

However, in the 1930s and early 1940s Budapest was a safe haven for Slovak, German, and Austrian Jewish refugees and a center of Hungarian Jewish cultural life.

In 2006 the Company for Hungarian Jewish Minority failed to collect 1000 signatures for a petition to declare Hungarian Jews a minority, even though there are at least 100,000 Jews in the country. The official Hungarian Jewish religious organization, Mazsihisz, advised not to vote for the new status because they think that Jews identify themselves as a religious group, not as a 'national minority'. There was no real control throughout the process and non-Jewish people could also sign the petition.

== Notable dates ==
- 1844 – Hungarian is gradually introduced for all civil records (kept at local parishes until 1895). German became an official language again after the 1848 revolution, but the laws reverted in 1881 yet again.
- 1849 – The Hungarian Parliament during the Hungarian Revolution War, passed the first minority right in Europe, an act acknowledging the rights of non-Hungarians to use their own language on local and minor administrative levels and to maintain their own schools.
- 1868 – After the Kingdom of Hungary reached the Compromise with the Habsburg Dynasty in 1867, one of the first acts of its restored Parliament was to pass a Law on Nationalities (Act Number XLIV of 1868). It was a liberal piece of legislation and offered extensive language and cultural rights.
- 1874 – All Slovak secondary schools (created in 1860) were closed. Also the Matica slovenská was closed down in April 1875. The building was taken over by the Hungarian government and the property of Matica slovenská, which according to the statutes belonged to the Slovak nation, was confiscated by the Prime Minister's office, with the justification that, according to Hungarian laws, there did not exist a Slovak nation.
- 1883 – The Upper Hungary Magyar Educational Society, (the Hungarian name of the NGO was FEMKE), was created. The society was founded to propagate Magyar values and Magyar education in Upper Hungary.
- 1897 – The Bánffy law of the villages is ratified. According to this law, all officially used village names in the Hungarian Kingdom had to be in Hungarian language.
- 1898 – Simon Telkes publishes the book "How to Magyarize family names".
- 1907 – The Apponyi educational law made Hungarian a compulsory subject in all schools in the Kingdom of Hungary. This also extended to confessional and communal schools, which had the right to provide instruction in a minority language as well. "All pupils regardless of their native language must be able to express their thoughts in Hungarian both in spoken and in written form at the end of fourth grade [~ at the age of 10 or 11]"
- 1907 – The Černová massacre in present-day northern Slovakia, a controversial event in which 15 people were killed during a clash between a group of gendarmes and local villagers. However the majority of the members of the gendarmes involved in the shooting were of Slovak origin (five persons from the total seven).

== After Trianon ==
A considerable number of other nationalities remained within the frontiers of the post-Trianon Hungary:

According to the 1920 census 10.4% of the population spoke one of the minority languages as their mother language:

- 551,212 German (6.9%)
- 141,882 Slovak (1.8%)
- 23,760 Romanian (0.3%)
- 36,858 Croatian (0.5%)
- 23,228 Bunjevac and Šokci (0.3%)
- 17,131 Serb (0.2%)

The number of bilingual people was much higher, for example

- 1,398,729 people spoke German (17%)
- 399,176 people spoke Slovak (5%)
- 179,928 people spoke Croatian (2.2%)
- 88,828 people spoke Romanian (1.1%).

Hungarian was spoken by 96% of the total population and was the mother language of 89%.

In interwar period, Hungary expanded its university system so the administrators could be produced to carry out the Magyarization of the lost territories for the case they were regained. In this period the Roman Catholic clerics dwelled on Magyarization in the school system even more strongly than did the civil service.

The percentage and the absolute number of all non-Hungarian nationalities decreased in the next decades, although the total population of the country increased. Bilingualism was also disappearing. The main reasons of this process were both spontaneous assimilation and the deliberate Magyarization policy of the state. Minorities made up 8% of the total population in 1930 and 7% in 1941 (on the post-Trianon territory).

After World War II about 200,000 Germans were deported to Germany according to the decree of the Potsdam Conference. Under the forced exchange of population between Czechoslovakia and Hungary, approximately 73,000 Slovaks left Hungary. After these population movements Hungary became an ethnically almost homogeneous country except the rapidly growing number of Romani people in the second half of the 20th century.

After the First Vienna Award which gave Carpathian Ruthenia to Hungary, a Magyarization campaign was started by the Hungarian government in order to remove Slavic nationalism from Catholic Churches and society. There were reported interferences in the Uzhhorod (Ungvár) Greek Catholic seminary, and the Hungarian-language schools excluded all pro-Slavic students.

According to Chris Hann, most of the Greek Catholics in Hungary are of Rusyn and Romanian origin, but they have been almost totally Magyarized. While according to the Hungarian Catholic Lexicon, though originally, in the 17th century, the Greek Catholics in the Kingdom of Hungary were mostly composed of Rusyns and Romanians, they also had Polish and Hungarian members. Their number increased drastically in the 17–18th centuries, when during the conflict with Protestants many Hungarians joined the Greek Catholic Church, and so adopted the Byzantine Rite rather than the Latin. In the end of the 18th century, the Hungarian Greek Catholics themselves started to translate their rites to Hungarian and created a movement to create their own diocese.

== See also ==
- Treaty of Trianon
- Transylvanian Memorandum
- Slovakization
- Romanianization
- Serbianisation
- Ukrainization
- Germanisation
- Croatisation
- Slovenisation
- Anti-Hungarian sentiment
- 1848–1849 massacres in Transylvania
- Magyaron
- Transylvanian Armenians: conversion from Armenian Apostolic Church to Catholicism (see Gherla and Dumbrăveni)

== Sources ==
- Rothenberg, Gunther E. (1976), The Army of Francis Joseph, Purdue University Press
- Dr. Dimitrije Kirilović, Pomađarivanje u bivšoj Ugarskoj, Novi Sad – Srbinje, 2006 (reprint). Originally printed in Novi Sad in 1935.
- Dr. Dimitrije Kirilović, Asimilacioni uspesi Mađara u Bačkoj, Banatu i Baranji, Novi Sad – Srbinje, 2006 (reprint). Originally printed in Novi Sad in 1937 as Asimilacioni uspesi Mađara u Bačkoj, Banatu i Baranji – Prilog pitanju demađarizacije Vojvodine.
- Lazar Stipić, Istina o Mađarima, Novi Sad – Srbinje, 2004 (reprint). Originally printed in Subotica in 1929 as Istina o Madžarima.
- Dr. Fedor Nikić, Mađarski imperijalizam, Novi Sad – Srbinje, 2004 (reprint). Originally printed in Novi Sad in 1929.
- Borislav Jankulov, Pregled kolonizacije Vojvodine u XVIII i XIX veku, Novi Sad – Pančevo, 2003.
- Dimitrije Boarov, Politička istorija Vojvodine, Novi Sad, 2001.
- Robert Bideleux and Ian Jeffries, A History of Eastern Europe: Crisis and Change, Routledge, 1998. ISBN 0-415-16111-8 hardback, ISBN 0-415-16112-6 paper.
