= Pál Almásy =

Hungarian lawyer and politician

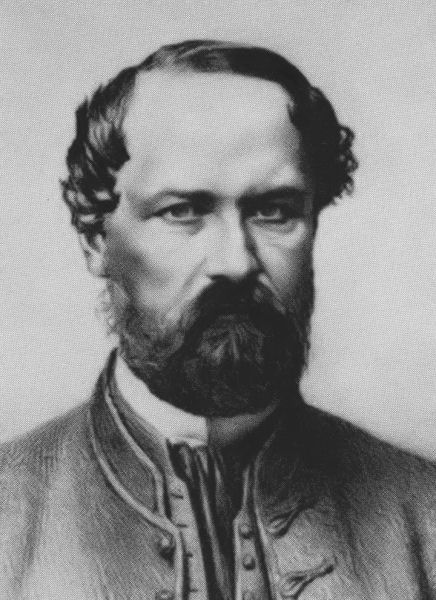

Speaker of the House of Representatives
- In office 9 January 1849 – 2 July 1849
- Preceded by: Dénes Pázmándy
- Succeeded by: László Palóczy

Personal details
- Born: 1818 Gyöngyös, Kingdom of Hungary
- Died: 1 November 1882 (aged 64) Budapest, Austria-Hungary
- Party: Opposition Party
- Profession: politician

Pál Almásy de Zsadány et Törökszentmiklós (1818 – 1 November 1882) was a Hungarian lawyer and politician, who served as Speaker of the House of Representatives in 1849.

== Career ==
After studying law he became a lawyer in 1838. He participated in the working of Diet of 1844 as emissary for Heves and Külső-Szolnok County. He served as Viscount (vicecomes) of the county between 1844 and 1847.

He was elected to a member of the House of Representatives in Spring 1848 as representative of Gyöngyös, his birthplace. He was appointed deputy speaker of the first popular representation legislature in April. At the end of the year, during attack of General Franz Schlik he functioned as Government Commissioner of Heves and Külső-Szolnok County. After that, when the National Assembly moved to Debrecen after fall of Buda, he returned to his legislative office. However Speaker Dénes Pázmándy surrendered before Field Marshal Windisch-Grätz in January 1849, therefore Almásy became speaker of the lower house in Debrecen. He announced Hungarian Declaration of Independence on 14 April 1849 which contained dethronement of the House of Habsburg-Lorraine. He was also one of the signatories of the document as well as Speaker of the House of Magnates Zsigmond Perényi and House of Representatives Recorder Imre Szacsvay.

After defeat of the Hungarian Revolution of 1848 he emigrated to Paris. In 1851 the Pest Military Tribunal sentenced him to death in absentia. The sentence was performed symbolically. He had a close relationship with other members of emigration such as György Klapka, László Teleki, Mihály Horváth but he had a bad relationship with Lajos Kossuth because he condemned Kossuth's personal leadership style.

He returned to home in 1859 but still remained in connection with Klapka. He did not appoint himself during 1861 elections but involved in politics actively besides Resolution Party. He started to organize with Lajos Beniczky and István Nedeczky against Habsburg rule and for restitution of Hungarian independence alongside 1848 laws. It was revealed only in 1918 that one of the participants Lajos Asbóth (father of Union general Sándor Asbóth) was an informer of the Austrian police. Almásy was arrested in 1864 and sentenced to 20 years imprisonment in the next year. He released in 1867 after Austro-Hungarian Compromise when many political prisoners granted an amnesty. Then he lived in retirement until his death in 1882.

Political offices
Preceded by Dénes Pázmándy	Speaker of the House of Representatives; 1849	Succeeded by László Palóczy
