= Tamás Péchy =

Hungarian nobleman and politician

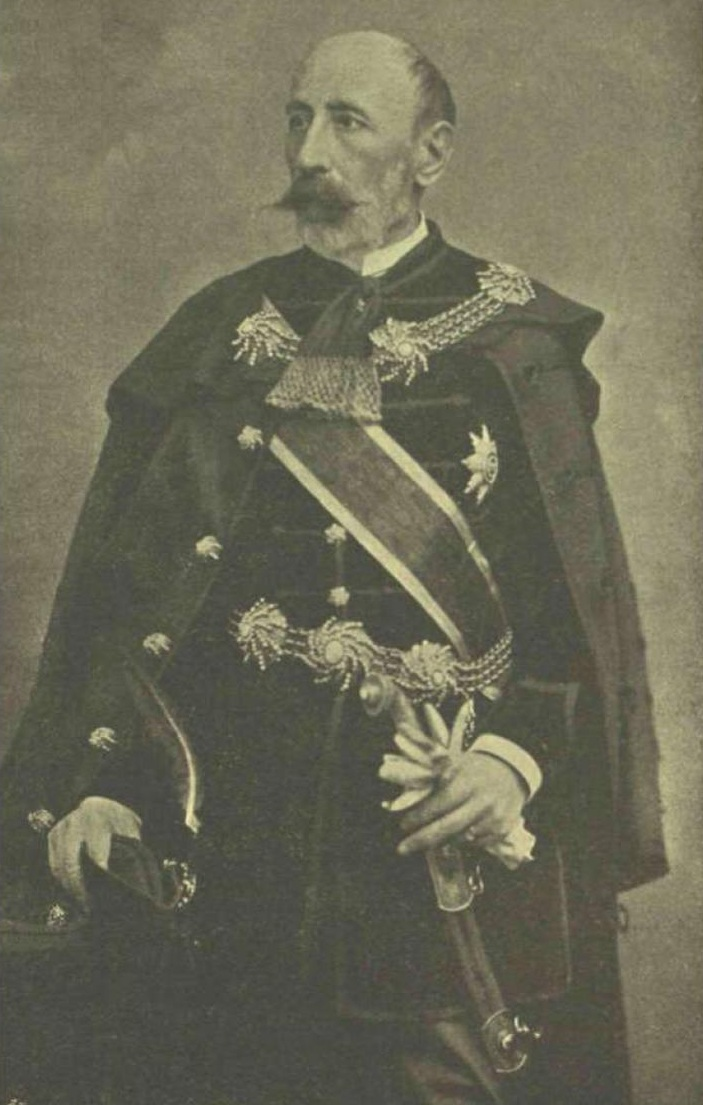

Speaker of the House of Representatives
- In office 13 April 1880 – 20 February 1892
- Preceded by: József Szlávy
- Succeeded by: Dezső Bánffy

Personal details
- Born: 6 December 1828 Alsókázsmárk, Kingdom of Hungary
- Died: 17 September 1897 (aged 68) Alsókázsmárk, Austria-Hungary
- Party: Centre Left Party, Liberal Party
- Profession: politician

Tamás Péchy de Pécsújfalu (6 December 1828 – 17 September 1897) was a Hungarian nobleman and politician, who served as Minister of Public Works and Transport (1875–1880) and as Speaker of the House of Representatives (1880–1892). He also functioned as Inspector of the Lutheran Diocese of Tisza from 1876 to 1897.

== Biography ==
He was born in the Péchy family estate in Alsókázsmárk (today: Kázsmárk, Borsod-Abaúj-Zemplén County). His parents were Tamás Péchy, Sr. (1792–1862), who came from the Lutheran branch of the family, Chief Constable of Szikszó District, later court judge; and Katalin Bárczay (1802–1832) who died young. He had three older siblings: both of his brothers (Gábor [1822–1877] and István [1826–1905]) became Hussar Lieutenants, while his sister, Katalin (1820–1905) married to Antal Darvas de Nagyrét, brother of Lord Lieutenant (Count; comes) of Abaúj-Torna County Imre Darvas.

Péchy started studies in his birthplace under the supervision of Pál Lukács. He finished secondary school studies in Eperjes and Sárospatak. During this time his educator was Mihály Tompa. After graduating in Law Academy he worked as a draftsman, but when the Hungarian Revolution of 1848 broke out he joined to the revolutionary army. He fought through the war of independence and promoted to Captain. After Surrender at Világos he was arrested and enlisted in the Imperial Austrian Army where served for half a year. After that he traveled to Western Europe where he studied geology and other natural sciences. After returning home he managed the family's estates.

=== Political career ===
He began his political career in 1861 when he became leading committee of Abaúj County. He quickly rose in the hierarchy, he was appointed Deputy Lieutenant (Viscount; vicecomes) in 1867 but one year later he resigned and became representative of Szikszó District. He was a supporter of Kálmán Tisza and participated in working of House of Representatives as a member of the Centre Left. His party merged into Deák Party as a result Péchy joined newly established Liberal Party in 1875. He was appointed Minister of Public Works and Transport on 2 March 1875 in the cabinets of Béla Wenckheim and Kálmán Tisza. He held his office until 1880. He began nationalization of the railways (etc. Tisza line) which was developed successfully by Gábor Baross. Furthermore, his most important activity was the railways' case management language make to Hungarian language.

He was appointed Speaker of the House of Representatives on 14 April 1880 succeeding József Szlávy who became Joint Finance Minister of Austria-Hungary. This assignment was represented for 12 years by him. In 1892 the Liberal Party replaced him with Dezső Bánffy. After adoption of the new Church Policy Act he withdrew from the party. He was elected group leader of the non-partisans.

=== Family ===
Péchy married Albertina Mensáros de Nagykerek, daughter of Károly Mensáros and Mária Péchy, on 28 May 1857 in Átány, Heves County. They had ten children.

Political offices
| Preceded by József Zichy | Minister of Public Works and Transport; 1875–1880 | Succeeded by Gyula Szapáry |
| Preceded by József Szlávy | Speaker of the House of Representatives; 1880–1892 | Succeeded by Dezső Bánffy |
