= Görög Katolikus Szemle (1899–1918) =

- Type: Weekly
- Publisher: Society of Saint Basil the Great (1899-1901), Union Book Publishing Company (1902-1918)
- Editor: Viktor Kaminsky
- Founded: 1899
- Ceased publication: December 1918
- Language: Hungarian language

Görög Katolikus Szemle ('Greek Catholic Survey') was a Hungarian-language Greek Catholic weekly newspaper published from Ungvár, Subcarpathian Rus, between 1899 and 1918. Görög Katolikus Szemle was the organ of the Society of Saint Basil the Great 1899–1901, and by the Unio Book Publishing Company 1902–1918.

Viktor Kaminsky was the editor of the newspaper for most of its existence.

Politically, the newspaper represented a sector of the Greek Catholic clergy. The group behind Görög Katolikus Szemle supported the Habsburg monarchy, but opposed Hungarian assimilation of the Rusyn people. The group symbolically supported use of Church Slavonic and Cyrillic script.

Görög Katolikus Szemle was closed down in December 1918, after the fall of the Austro-Hungarian empire. In 1919 Kárpát was launched as a continuation, but that publication did not last beyond that year.
