= László Palóczy =

Hungarian politician (1783–1861)

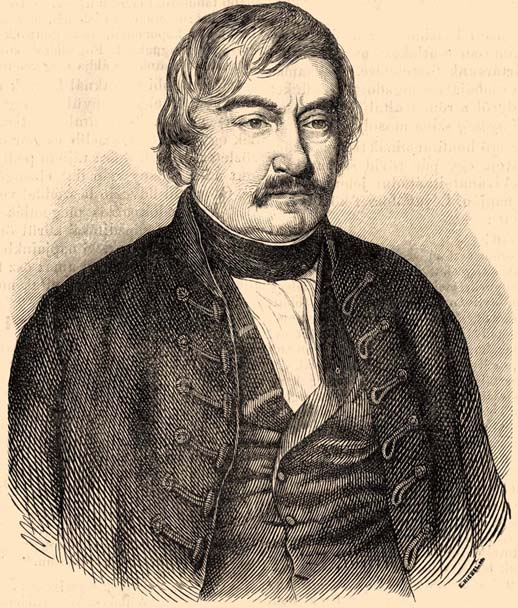

Speaker of the House of Representatives
- In office 9 January 1849 – 11 August 1849
- Preceded by: Pál Almásy
- Succeeded by: Kálmán Ghyczy

Personal details
- Born: 14 October 1783; Miskolc, Kingdom of Hungary
- Died: 27 April 1861 (aged 77); Pest, Kingdom of Hungary
- Political party: Opposition Party
- Profession: politician

László Palóczy (14 October 1783 – 27 April 1861) was a Hungarian politician, who served as acting Speaker of the House of Representatives as oldest member of the lower house in 1849.

He was sentenced to death after the surrender at Világos but the sentence was changed to life imprisonment. After his release he moved to Miskolc. He became a member of the Diet of Hungary again in 1861, shortly before his death. He was the oldest member too. A street was named after him in his birthplace.

Political offices
Preceded by Pál Almásy	Speaker of the House of Representatives; 1849	Succeeded by Kálmán Ghyczy
