= Kálmán Ghyczy =

Hungarian politician (1808–1888)

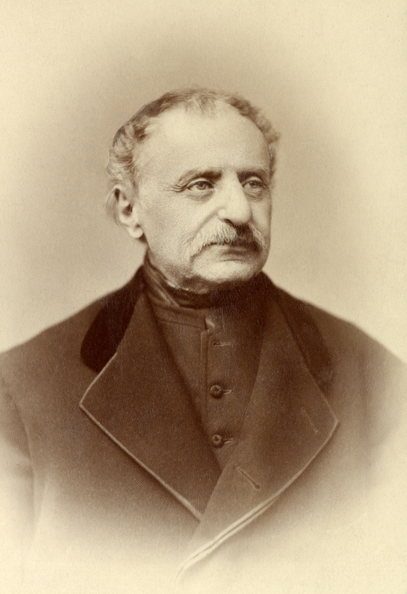

Minister of Finance of Hungary
- In office 21 March 1874 – 2 March 1875
- Preceded by: József Szlávy
- Succeeded by: Kálmán Széll

Personal details
- Born: 12 February 1808 Komárom, Kingdom of Hungary
- Died: 28 February 1888 (aged 80) Budapest, Austria-Hungary
- Party: Left Centre; Resolution Party
- Profession: politician, lawyer

Kálmán Ghyczy de Ghicz, Assakürt et Ablánczkürt (12 February 1808 – 28 February 1888) was a Hungarian politician, who served as Minister of Finance between 1874 and 1875. He became representative of Komárom County in 1843. During the Hungarian Revolution of 1848 he served as state secretary of the Ministry of Justice. After the defeat Ghyczy retired from the politics for a time.

He was appointed Speaker of the House of Representatives in 1861. He didn't support the compromise with the Austrians. Later his views changed. Ghyczy founded a new party named the Central Party. He supported the case of the compromise since the left centre is a party with this practically came to an end with his secession. In 1874 he was appointed Minister of Finance, he was the only opposition member of the cabinet. He took over as Minister of Finance in a period when the budget struggled with chronic troubles. Economic optimism brought the country under control in the years after the compromise, many people waited for the taxes' reduction. Was in need of a tax increase in the truth of the budget, but nobody dared to say this. Ghyczy took over this role and the unpopularity, pushing his way for his successor's, Kálmán Széll fiscal policy.

Ghyczy submitted the 1875 budget which earmarked, that from the deficiency of the budget let 13 million forints be met the cost of from tax increases. His former ally, Kálmán Tisza launched a hard political campaign against the budget however and when a dot came into existence with the leadership of Tisza in 1875 of his Februaries the fusional cabinet's, Ghyczy leaving turned into one of which clear cannot be kept. According to the fusional agreement but his successor Széll, who was member of the Deák Party, became faithful of the tax increases.

Ghyczy later served again as Speaker of the House of Representatives (until 1879). In 1885 he became a member of the House of Magnates.

Political offices
Preceded by László Palóczy	Speaker of the House of Representatives; 1861	Succeeded by Károly Szentiványi
Preceded by József Szlávy	Minister of Finance; 1874–1875	Succeeded by Kálmán Széll
Preceded by Béla Perczel	Speaker of the House of Representatives; 1875–1879	Succeeded by József Szlávy
