= Blatná na Ostrove =

Blatná na Ostrove Sárosfa
- Municipality
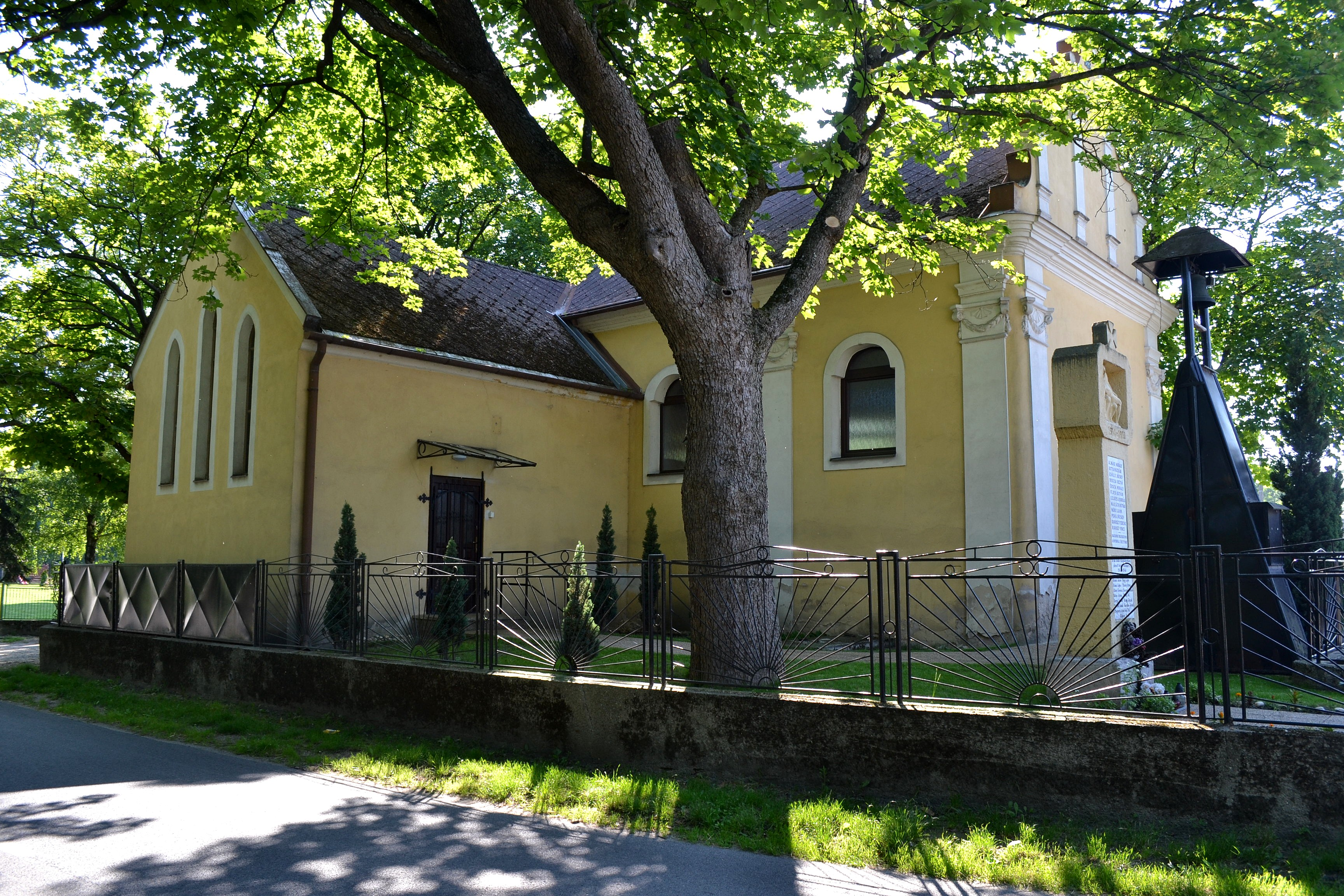

- Flag

- Location of Blatná na Ostrove in the Trnava Region Location of Blatná na Ostrove in Slovakia
- Coordinates: 48.01°N 17.44°E
- Country: Slovakia
- Region: Trnava Region
- District: Dunajská Streda District
- First mentioned: 1286

Government
  - Mayor: Terézia Földváry

Area
  - Total: 10.77 km^{2} (4.16 sq mi)
- Elevation: 121 m (397 ft)

Population (2025)
  - Total: 978

Ethnicity
  - Hungarians: 87.89%
  - Slovaks: 10.17%
- Time zone: UTC+1 (CET)
  - Summer (DST): UTC+2 (CEST)
- Postal code: 930 32
- Area code: +421 31
- Vehicle registration plate (until 2022): DS
- Website: www.blatnanaostrove.sk

Blatná na Ostrove (Hungarian: Sárosfa, pronounced [ˈʃaːroʃfɒ]) is a village and municipality in the Dunajská Streda District in the Trnava Region of south-west Slovakia. It has a post-office, a food store, a petrol station, and a bar. There is also a football playground and a public library in the village.

== Geography ==
The municipality lies at an altitude of 121 metres (397 ft) and covers an area of 10.77 km^{2} (4.16 sq mi) (2025).

== History ==
In the 9th century, the territory of Blatná na Ostrove became part of the Kingdom of Hungary. After the Austro-Hungarian army disintegrated in November 1918, Czechoslovak troops occupied the area, later acknowledged internationally by the Treaty of Trianon. Between 1938 and 1945 Blatná na Ostrove once more became part of Miklós Horthy's Hungary through the First Vienna Award. From 1945 until the Velvet Divorce, it was part of Czechoslovakia. Since then it has been part of Slovakia.

== Population ==
Population statistic (10 years)
Year	1995	2005	2015	2025
Count	779	841	883	978
Difference		+7.95%	+4.99%	+10.75%

Population statistic
Year	2024	2025
Count	994	978
Difference		−1.60%

It has a population of 978 people (31 December 2025).

=== Ethnicity ===
Census 2021 (1+ %)
Ethnicity	Number	Fraction
Hungarian	707	72.06%
Slovak	278	28.33%
Not found out	38	3.87%
Total	981	

In year 2021 was 981 people by ethnicity 707 as Hungarian, 278 as Slovak, 38 as Not found out, 8 as Romani, 5 as Czech, 4 as Russian, 3 as Other, 2 as Ukrainian, 2 as Polish, 2 as Bulgarian, 1 as Irish, 1 as German, 1 as Moravian and 1 as Croatian.

Note on population: The difference values of population numbers in the table "Population statistic" and in the sections "Ethnicity" & "Religion" is caused by the use of various statistical methods.

=== Religion ===
Census 2021 (1+ %)
Religion	Number	Fraction
Roman Catholic Church	687	70.03%
None	214	21.81%
Not found out	28	2.85%
Evangelical Church	17	1.73%
Calvinist Church	14	1.43%
Total	981	

In year 2021 was 981 people by religion 687 from Roman Catholic Church, 214 from None, 28 from Not found out, 17 from Evangelical Church, 14 from Calvinist Church, 8 from Greek Catholic Church, 3 from Apostolic Church, 2 from Other and not ascertained christian church, 2 from Other, 1 from Old Catholic Church, 1 from Eastern Orthodox Church, 1 from Christian Congregations in Slovakia, 1 from Islam, 1 from Czechoslovak Hussite Church and 1 from Buddhism.

== Notable people ==
- István Bittó (1822–1903), a Hungarian politician, Prime Minister of Hungary from 1874 to 1875, was born here.

== See also ==
- List of municipalities and towns in Slovakia

== Genealogical resources ==
The records for genealogical research are available at the state archive "Statny Archiv in Bratislava, Slovakia"

- Roman Catholic church records (births/marriages/deaths): 1689-1905 (parish B)
- Lutheran church records (births/marriages/deaths): 1706-1895 (parish B)
