= Károly Szentiványi =

Hungarian politician (1802–1877)

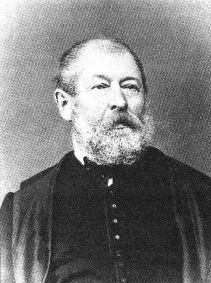

Speaker of the House of Representatives
- In office 20 December 1865 – 22 April 1869
- Preceded by: Kálmán Ghyczy
- Succeeded by: Pál Somssich

Personal details
- Born: January 1802 Besztercebánya, Kingdom of Hungary
- Died: 26 January 1877 (aged 75) Budapest, Austria-Hungary
- Party: Address Party, Deák Party
- Profession: politician

Károly Szentiványi de Liptószentiván (January 1802 – 26 January 1877) was a Hungarian official and politician, who served as Speaker of the House of Representatives between 1865 and 1869.

Political offices
| Preceded by Kálmán Ghyczy | Speaker of the House of Representatives; 1865–1869 | Succeeded by Pál Somssich |
