= Béla Perczel =

Hungarian politician (1819-1888)

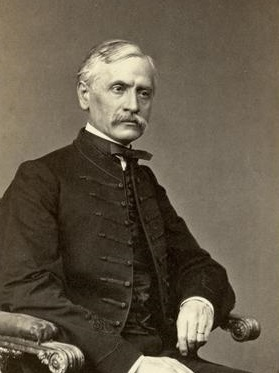

Minister of Justice of Hungary
- In office 2 March 1875 – 30 June 1878
- Prime Minister: Béla Wenckheim; Kálmán Tisza
- Preceded by: Tivadar Pauler
- Succeeded by: Tivadar Pauler

Personal details
- Born: 15 June 1819 Börzsönypuszta, Kingdom of Hungary
- Died: 25 March 1888 (aged 68) Budapest, Austria-Hungary
- Party: Deák Party, Liberal Party
- Spouse: Elvira Boronkay
- Children: Dezső; Gizella; Béla; Dénes; Ferenc
- Profession: politician, jurist

Dr. Béla Perczel de Bonyhád (15 June 1819 – 25 March 1888) was a Hungarian politician and jurist, who served as Minister of Justice between 1875 and 1878. His son was the Interior Minister and Speaker of the House of Representatives Dezső Perczel. He was the leader of the Deák Party between 1869 and 1872. He was elected as Speaker of the House of Representatives in 1874.

Béla Wenckheim appointed him Minister of Justice in 1875. Perczel held his position in the Kálmán Tisza cabinet. The first modern Hungarian penal code (Csemegi Codex) is connected to his name. He resigned in 1878. Later he became chairman of the Court. He was a member of the House of Magnates from 1886 until his death.

Political offices
Preceded by István Bittó	Speaker of the House of Representatives; 1874–1875	Succeeded by Kálmán Ghyczy
Preceded by Tivadar Pauler	Minister of Justice; 1875–1878	Succeeded by Tivadar Pauler
