= József Eötvös =

Hungarian politician (1813–1871)

Baron József Eötvös de Vásárosnamény
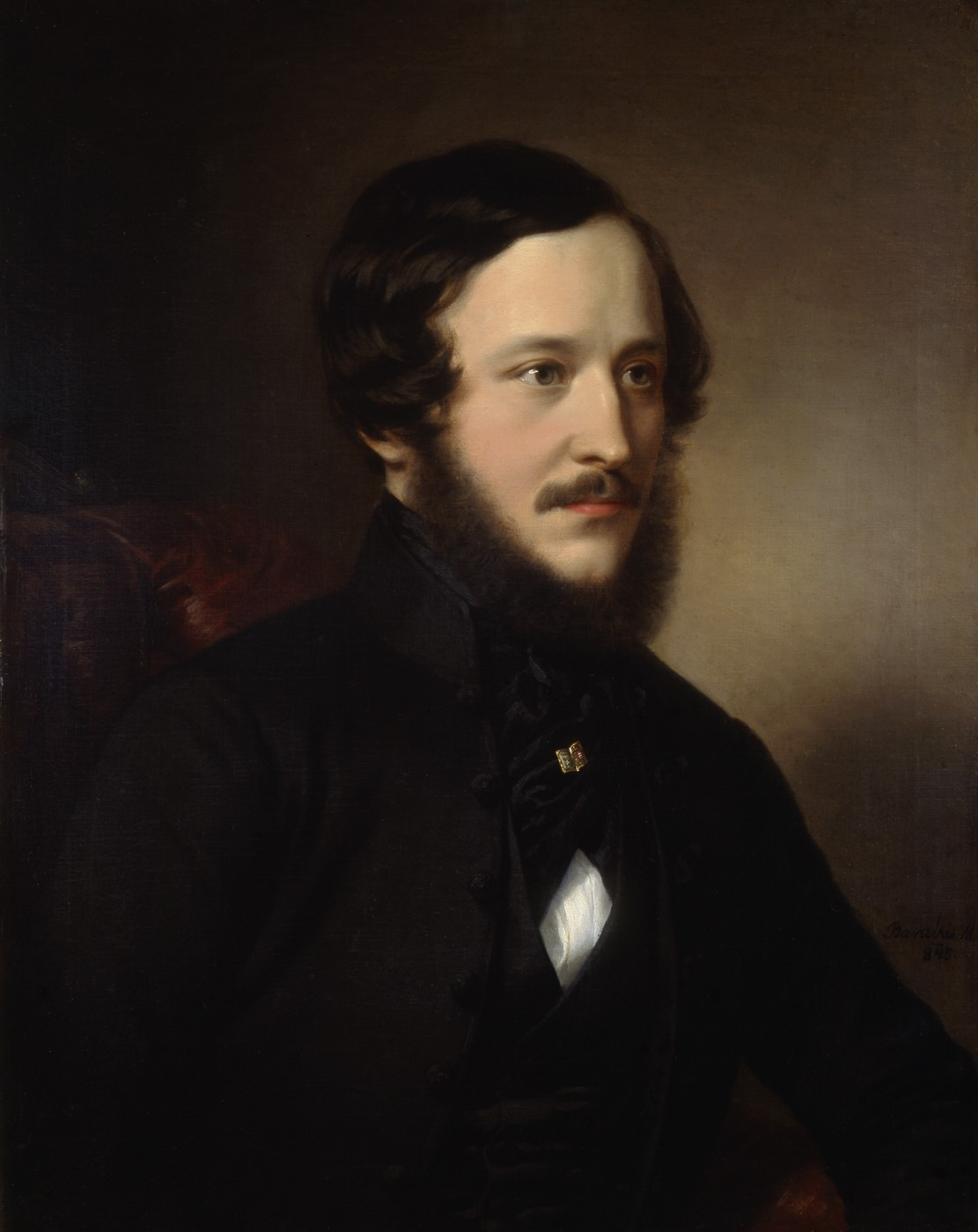
- Portrait by Miklós Barabás (1845)

Minister of Education of the Kingdom of Hungary
- In office 7 April 1848 – 11 September 1848
- Prime Minister: Lajos Batthyány
- Preceded by: Office established
- Succeeded by: Lajos Batthyány

Minister of Religion and Education of the Kingdom of Hungary
- In office 20 February 1867 – 2 February 1871
- Prime Minister: Gyula Andrássy
- Preceded by: Mihály Horváth
- Succeeded by: József Szlávy

Personal details
- Born: 3 September 1813 Buda, Kingdom of Hungary, Austrian Empire
- Died: 2 February 1871 (aged 57) Pest, Austria-Hungary
- Resting place: Ercsi, Hungary
- Party: Deák Party (1865-1871)
- Other political affiliations: Opposition Party (1847-1848); Address Party (1861-1865)
- Spouse: Ágnes Rosty
- Children: 4, including Loránd
- Parents: Ignác Eötvös (father); Anna Lilien (mother)
- Education: Royal University of Pest
- Occupation: Lawyer; Politician; Writer

Baron József Eötvös de Vásárosnamény (pronounced ['joːʒɛf 'øtvøʃ dɛ 'vaːʃaːroʃnɒmeːɲ]; 3 September 1813 – 2 February 1871) was a Hungarian writer and statesman, the son of Ignác baron Eötvös de Vásárosnamény and Anna von Lilien, who stemmed from an Erbsälzer family of Werl in Germany. Eötvös name is sometimes anglicised as Joseph von Eotvos.

== Biography ==
The Baron József Eötvös de Vásárosnamény was born in the Hungarian aristocratic family Eötvös de Vásárosnamény. His father was the Baron Ignác Eötvös de Vásárosnamény (1786–1851), vice-chancellor of the Kingdom of Hungary, and his mother was the Baroness Anne von der Lilien (1786–1858). Alexandru Roman, professor of Romanian linguistics at the University of Budapest, claimed that a relative of Eötvös told him that his Eötvös' ancestor was an Aromanian silversmith (Eötvös means silversmith in Hungarian) who moved to Hungary in the early 18th-century.

On 13 September 1842 he married Ágnes Rosty de Barkóc (1825–1913). Baron Eötvös' brother in law was Pál Rosty de Barkócz (1830–1874), a Hungarian nobleman, photographer, explorer, who visited Texas, New Mexico, Mexico, Cuba and Venezuela between 1857 and 1859. Another brother-in-law was the politician Ágoston Trefort.

Eötvös disseminated his progressive ideas in the columns of the Pesti Hírlap, as well as in his novels The Village Notary (1844–1846) – one of the classics of Hungarian literature – Hungary in 1514, and the comedy Long live Equality!. The February Hungarian Revolution of 1848 was the complete triumph of Eötvös's ideas, and he held the portfolio of public worship and instruction in the first Hungarian ministry. Eötvös, Ferenc Deák and István Széchenyi represented the pacific, moderating influence in the council of ministers, but when the premier, Lajos Batthyány, resigned, Eötvös retired for a time to Munich during the War of Independence. Yet he continued to serve the cause in his influential writings, for example Influence of the Ruling Ideas of the 19th century on the State (Pest, 1851–1854, German editions at Vienna and Leipzig the same year).

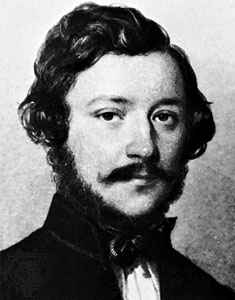
Steel engraving after a drawing by Miklós Barabás (1841)

On his return home, in 1851, he abstained from all political movements. In 1859 he published The Guarantees of the Power and Unity of Austria (the German edition was published in Leipzig the same year), in which he tried to arrive at a compromise between personal union and ministerial responsibility on the one hand and centralization on the other. After the Italian war, however, such a position was regarded as inadequate by the majority of the nation. In the diets of 1861, 1865, and 1867 Eötvös was one of the most loyal followers of Deák, with whose policy he now completely associated himself. On the formation of the Andrássy cabinet in February 1867 he once more accepted the portfolio of public worship and education, being the only one of the ministers of 1848 who thus returned to office. He had now, at last, the opportunity of realizing the ideals of a lifetime. That very year the diet passed his bill for the emancipation of the Jews; though his further efforts in the direction of religious liberty were less successful, owing to the opposition of the Catholics. Perhaps his greatest achievement was the National Schools Act, the most complete system of education provided for Hungary since the days of Maria Theresa. In 1866, he was elected president of the Hungarian academy. He died at Pest on 2 February 1871. On 3 May 1879 a statue was erected to him at Pest in the square which bears his name.

== Family ==
- Loránd Eötvös
- Actor and playwright Leo Ditrichstein was his grandson.

Political offices
Preceded by post created	Minister of Education; 1848	Succeeded by Lajos Batthyány
Preceded by Mihály Horváth	Minister of Religion and Education; 1867–1871	Succeeded by József Szlávy
Cultural offices
Preceded by Emil Dessewffy	President of the Hungarian Academy of Sciences; 1866–1871	Succeeded by Menyhért Lónyay
