= List of speakers of the House of Representatives (Hungary) =

Speaker of House of Representatives
- A képviselőház elnöke
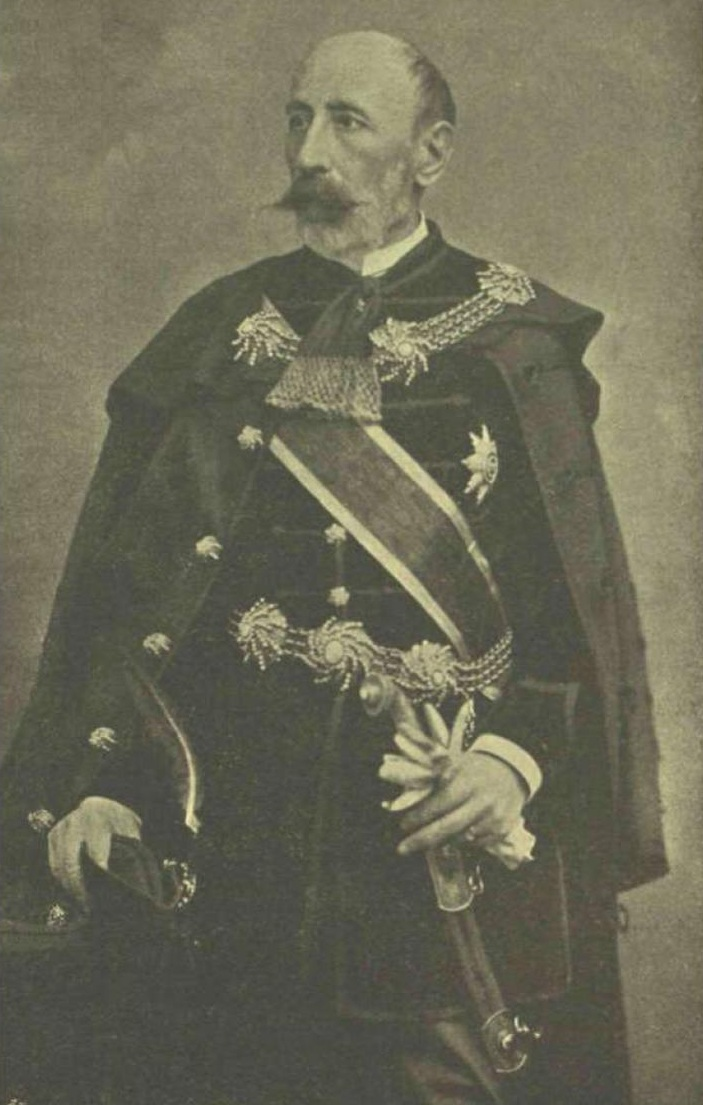
- Longest serving Tamás Péchy; 13 April 1880 – 20 February 1892
- House of Representatives
- Type: Speaker
- Member of: Diet of Hungary
- Formation: 10 July 1848
- First holder: Dénes Pázmándy
- Final holder: András Tasnádi Nagy
- Abolished: 29 March 1945

The Speaker of the House of Representatives (Hungarian: A képviselőház elnöke) was the presiding officer of the House of Representatives, the lower chamber of the Diet of Hungary.

The House of Representatives was initially established during the Hungarian Revolution of 1848, and existed with interruptions between 1848 and 1918.

== List of officeholders ==
=== 1848–1918 ===
Parties EP/HP/F48P DP/SZP/NMP

No.	Portrait	Name (Birth–Death)	Term of office			Political party
No.	Portrait	Name (Birth–Death)	Took office	Left office	Tenure	Political party
1		Dénes Pázmándy (1816–1856)	10 July 1848	9 January 1849	183 days	EP
2		Pál Almásy (1818–1882)	9 January 1849	2 July 1849	174 days	EP
—		László Palóczy (1783–1861)	9 January 1849	11 August 1849	214 days	EP
The National Assembly was disbanded (11 August 1849 – 17 April 1861)
3		Kálmán Ghyczy (1808–1888)	17 April 1861	22 August 1861	127 days	HP
The National Assembly was disbanded (22 August 1861 – 20 December 1865)
4		Károly Szentiványi (1802–1877)	20 December 1865	22 April 1869	3 years, 123 days	DP
5		Pál Somssich (1811–1888)	1 May 1869	3 September 1872	3 years, 125 days	DP
6		István Bittó (1822–1903)	10 September 1872	21 March 1874	1 year, 192 days	DP
7		Béla Perczel (1819–1888)	24 March 1874	3 March 1875	344 days	DP
8		Kálmán Ghyczy (1808–1888)	5 March 1875	2 April 1879	4 years, 28 days	SZP
9		József Szlávy (1818–1900)	2 April 1879	12 April 1880	1 year, 10 days	SZP
10		Tamás Péchy (1828–1897)	13 April 1880	20 February 1892	11 years, 313 days	SZP
11		Dezső Bánffy (1843–1911)	25 February 1892	14 January 1895	2 years, 323 days	SZP
12		Dezső Szilágyi (1840–1901)	19 January 1895	9 December 1898	3 years, 329 days	SZP
—		József Madarász (1814–1915)	17 December 1898	2 March 1899	75 days	F48P
13		Dezső Perczel (1848–1913)	2 March 1899	26 October 1901	2 years, 238 days	SZP
14		Albert Apponyi (1846–1933)	31 October 1901	6 November 1903	2 years, 6 days	SZP
15		Dezső Perczel (1848–1913)	6 November 1903	17 February 1905	1 year, 103 days	SZP
16		Gyula Justh (1850–1917)	21 February 1905	12 November 1909	4 years, 264 days	F48P
17		Sándor Gál (1868–1937)	13 November 1909	23 June 1910	222 days	F48P
18		Albert Berzeviczy (1853–1936)	30 June 1910	7 November 1911	1 year, 130 days	NMP
19		Lajos Návay (1870–1919)	9 November 1911	21 May 1912	194 days	NMP
20		István Tisza (1861–1918)	22 May 1912	10 June 1913	1 year, 19 days	NMP
21		Pál Beőthy (1866–1921)	13 June 1913	28 June 1917	4 years, 15 days	NMP
22		Károly Szász (1865–1950)	3 July 1917	16 November 1918	1 year, 136 days	NMP

During the First Hungarian Republic the House of Representatives was replaced by the National Council. During the Hungarian Soviet Republic it was replaced by the National Assembly of Soviets. During the Kingdom of Hungary it was replaced by a unicameral National Assembly between 1920 and 1927. It was re-established between 1927 and 1945.

=== 1927–1945 ===
Parties EP/NEP/MÉP

No.	Portrait	Name (Birth–Death)	Term of office			Political party
No.	Portrait	Name (Birth–Death)	Took office	Left office	Tenure	Political party
23		Tibor Zsitvay (1884–1969)	31 January 1927	5 February 1929	2 years, 5 days	EP
24		László Almásy (1869–1936)	7 February 1929	29 April 1935	6 years, 81 days	EP
24		László Almásy (1869–1936)	7 February 1929	29 April 1935	6 years, 81 days	NEP
25		Sándor Sztranyavszky (1882–1942)	1 May 1935	17 May 1938	3 years, 16 days	NEP
26		Gyula Kornis (1885–1958)	20 May 1938	1 December 1938	195 days	NEP
27		Kálmán Darányi (1886–1939)	5 December 1938	1 November 1939	331 days	NEP
27		Kálmán Darányi (1886–1939)	5 December 1938	1 November 1939	331 days	MÉP
28		András Tasnádi Nagy (1882–1956)	1 November 1939	29 March 1945	5 years, 148 days	MÉP

== See also ==
- List of speakers of the House of Magnates
- List of speakers of the National Assembly (Hungary)

== Sources ==
- Official website of the National Assembly of Hungary (in Hungarian)
