= Pál Somssich =

Hungarian politician (1811–1888)

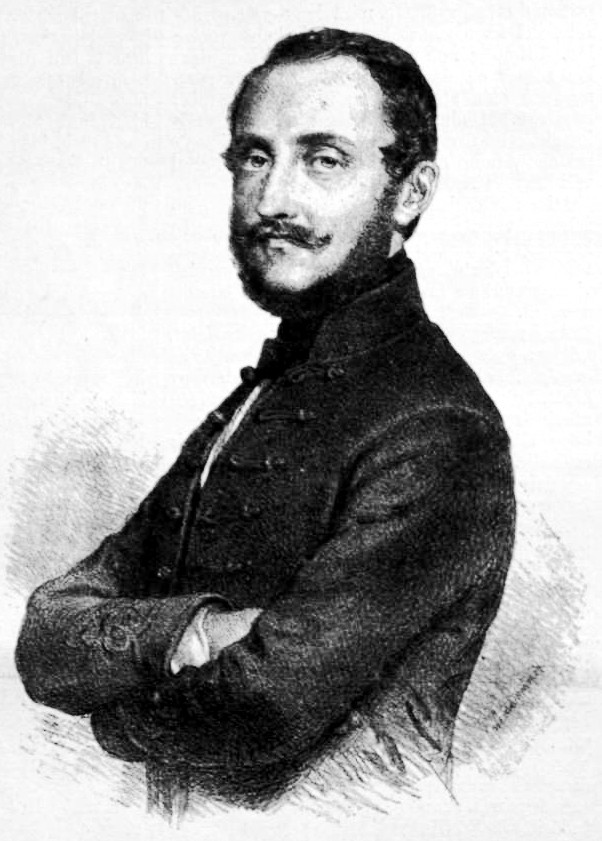

Speaker of the House of Representatives
- In office 1 May 1869 – 3 September 1872
- Preceded by: Károly Szentiványi
- Succeeded by: István Bittó

Personal details
- Born: 13 January 1811 Somogysárd, Kingdom of Hungary
- Died: 5 March 1888 (aged 77) Budapest, Austria-Hungary
- Party: Conservative Party, Address Party, Deák Party, Liberal Party, United Opposition, Moderate Opposition
- Profession: politician

Count Pál Somssich de Saárd (13 January 1811 – 5 March 1888) was a Hungarian conservative nobleman and politician, who served as Speaker of the House of Representatives between 1869 and 1872.

Political offices
Preceded by Károly Szentiványi	Speaker of the House of Representatives; 1869–1872	Succeeded by István Bittó
