= Dezső Perczel =

Hungarian politician (1848–1913)

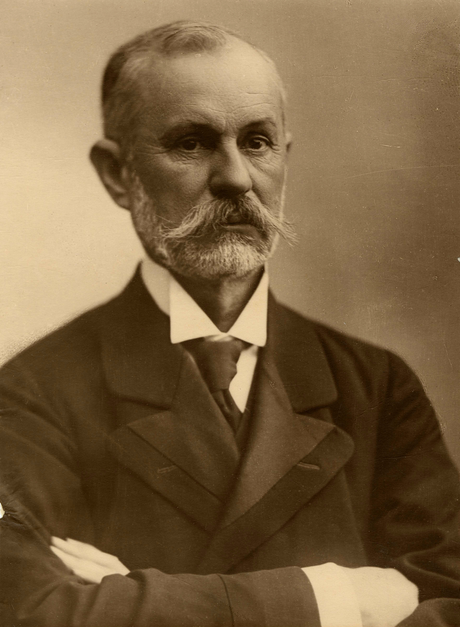

Minister of the Interior of Hungary
- In office 15 January 1895 – 26 February 1899
- Preceded by: Károly Hieronymi
- Succeeded by: Kálmán Széll

Personal details
- Born: 18 January 1848 Szekszárd, Kingdom of Hungary, Austrian Empire
- Died: 20 May 1913 (aged 65) Bonyhád, Austria-Hungary
- Party: Liberal Party, Party of National Work
- Profession: politician

Dr. Dezső Perczel de Bonyhád (18 January 1848 – 20 May 1913) was a Hungarian politician, who served as Interior Minister between 1895 and 1899 in Dezső Bánffy's cabinet. His father was Béla Perczel, a former Minister of Justice of Hungary. During his reigning Dezső Perczel supported the institution of civil marriage. He also made a law about the parish registers. He took several measures concerning about the labour movement's and the nationality movements' breaking off. Later (1903–1904) he fought against the Opposition's tactics of filibuster. He was a president of new-created Party of National Work.

Political offices
Preceded by Károly Hieronymi	Minister of the Interior; 1895–1899	Succeeded by Kálmán Széll
Preceded by József Madarász	Speaker of the House of Representatives; 1899–1901	Succeeded by Albert Apponyi
Preceded by Albert Apponyi	Speaker of the House of Representatives; 1903–1905	Succeeded by Gyula Justh
