= Tivadar Pauler =

Hungarian politician (1816–1886)

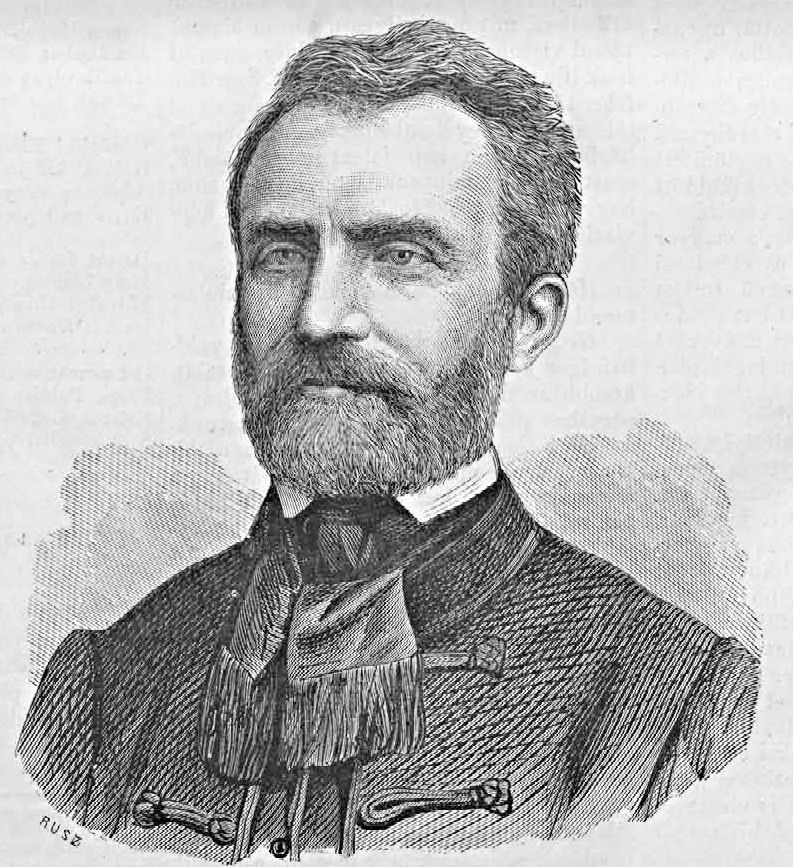

Minister of Religion and Education of Hungary
- In office 10 February 1871 – 4 September 1872
- Prime Minister: Gyula Andrássy; Menyhért Lónyay
- Preceded by: József Szlávy
- Succeeded by: Ágoston Trefort

Personal details
- Born: 9 April 1816 Buda, Kingdom of Hungary
- Died: 30 April 1886 (aged 70) Budapest, Austria-Hungary
- Party: Deák Party; Liberal Party
- Spouse: Juliska Pauler
- Children: Tivadar Pauler
- Profession: politician, jurist

Dr. Tivadar Pauler (9 April 1816 – 30 April 1886) was a Hungarian politician, who served as Minister of Religion and Education between 1871 and 1872. He taught for several universities in Zagreb, Győr and Pest. He was the chairman of the first Jurist Assembly in 1870. After 1872 he served as Minister of Justice until 1875. Kálmán Tisza appointed him Minister of Justice again in 1878. Pauler held this position until his death. He was also representative in the Diet of Hungary between 1871 and 1886. He became a member of the Hungarian Academy of Sciences in 1858.

The preparation of the Civil Act of Parliament and the penal code was started under his ministerial term. He was an advocate for Hungarian national interests, the university's autonomy, its electoral rights, and the full restoration of teaching in the Hungarian language.

Political offices
Preceded by József Szlávy	Minister of Religion and Education; 1871–1872	Succeeded by Ágoston Trefort
Preceded by István Bittó	Minister of Justice; 1872–1875	Succeeded by Béla Perczel
Preceded by Béla Perczel	Minister of Justice; 1878–1886	Succeeded by Teofil Fabiny
