= Nová Ves nad Žitavou =

Nová Ves nad Žitavou Zsitvaújfalu
- Municipality
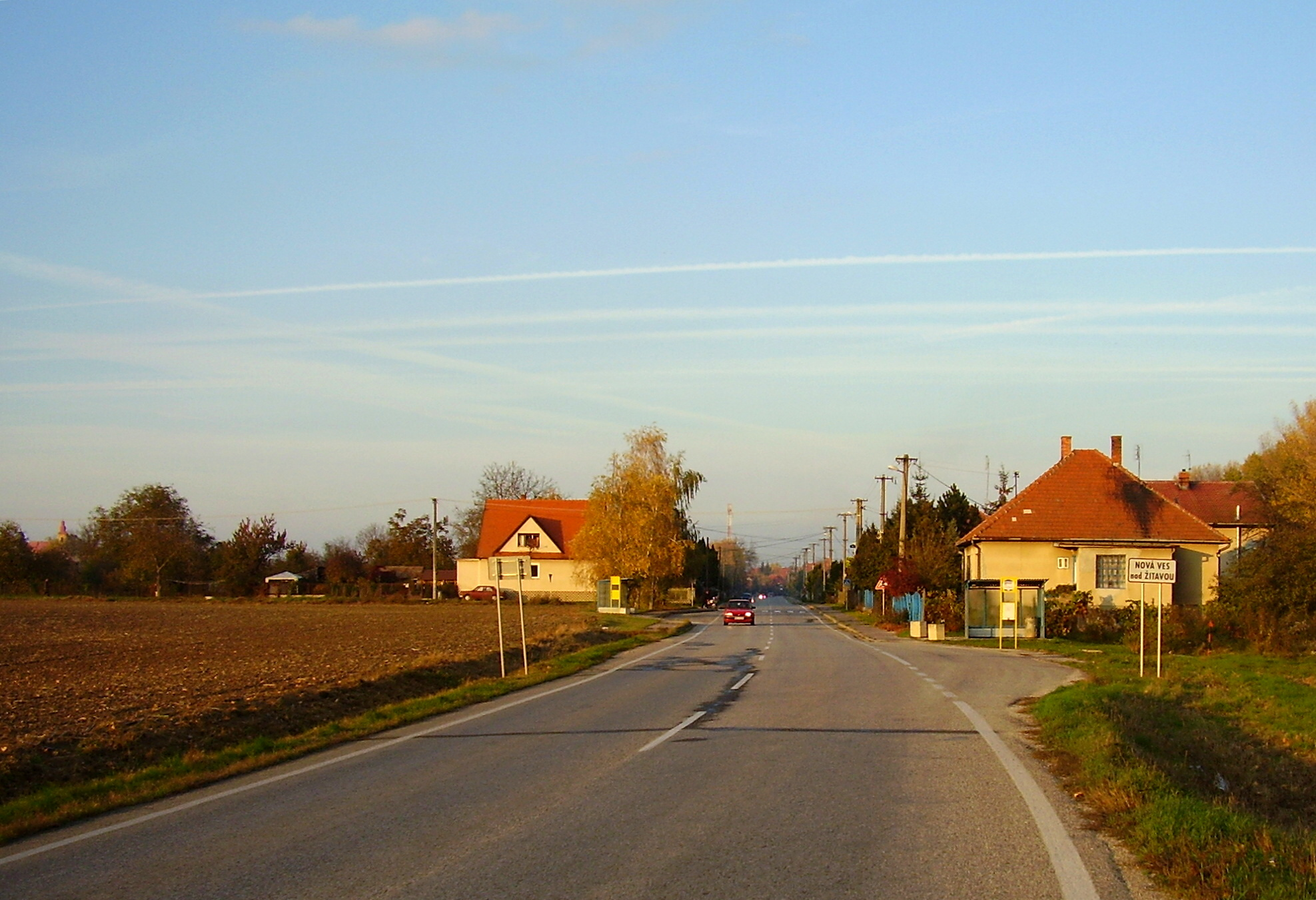

- Flag Coat of arms

- Location of Nová Ves nad Žitavou in the Nitra Region Location of Nová Ves nad Žitavou in Slovakia
- Coordinates: 48.28°N 18.33°E
- Country: Slovakia
- Region: Nitra Region
- District: Nitra District
- First mentioned: 1355

Area
  - Total: 10.17 km^{2} (3.93 sq mi)
- Elevation: 152 m (499 ft)

Population (2025)
  - Total: 1,398
- Time zone: UTC+1 (CET)
  - Summer (DST): UTC+2 (CEST)
- Postal code: 951 51
- Area code: +421 37
- Vehicle registration plate (until 2022): NR
- Website: www.novavesnadzitavou.sk

Nová Ves nad Žitavou (Hungarian: Zsitvaújfalu) is a village and municipality in the Nitra District in western central Slovakia, in the Nitra Region. The village lies at an elevation of 164 metres (538 ft) and covers an area of 10.173 km^{2} (3.928 sq mi). It has a population of about 1,270 people, with a distribution of approximately 99% Slovak and 1% Magyar. It was first mentioned in historical records in 1355. Since 1925 the village has a football club.

The village has a public library, a gym and a football pitch.

== Geography ==
The municipality lies at an altitude of 152 metres (499 ft) and covers an area of 10.17 km^{2} (3.93 sq mi) (2025).

== Population ==
Population statistic (10 years)
Year	1995	2005	2015	2025
Count	1322	1252	1350	1398
Difference		−5.29%	+7.82%	+3.55%

Population statistic
Year	2024	2025
Count	1392	1398
Difference		+0.43%

It has a population of 1398 people (31 December 2025).

=== Ethnicity ===
Census 2021 (1+ %)
Ethnicity	Number	Fraction
Slovak	1207	90.2%
Not found out	127	9.49%
Total	1338	

In year 2021 was 1338 people by ethnicity 1207 as Slovak, 127 as Not found out, 6 as Czech, 5 as Hungarian, 5 as Other, 2 as Romani, 1 as Ukrainian, 1 as Russian, 1 as Polish, 1 as German and 1 as Croatian.

Note on population: The difference values of population numbers in the table "Population statistic" and in the sections "Ethnicity" & "Religion" is caused by the use of various statistical methods.

=== Religion ===
Census 2021 (1+ %)
Religion	Number	Fraction
Roman Catholic Church	999	74.66%
None	198	14.8%
Not found out	120	8.97%
Total	1338	

In year 2021 was 1338 people by religion 999 from Roman Catholic Church, 198 from None, 120 from Not found out, 9 from Evangelical Church, 3 from Other, 3 from Ad hoc movements, 2 from Calvinist Church, 2 from Greek Catholic Church, 1 from Other and not ascertained christian church and 1 from Christian Congregations in Slovakia.
