= Mihály Horváth =

Catholic bishop and politician

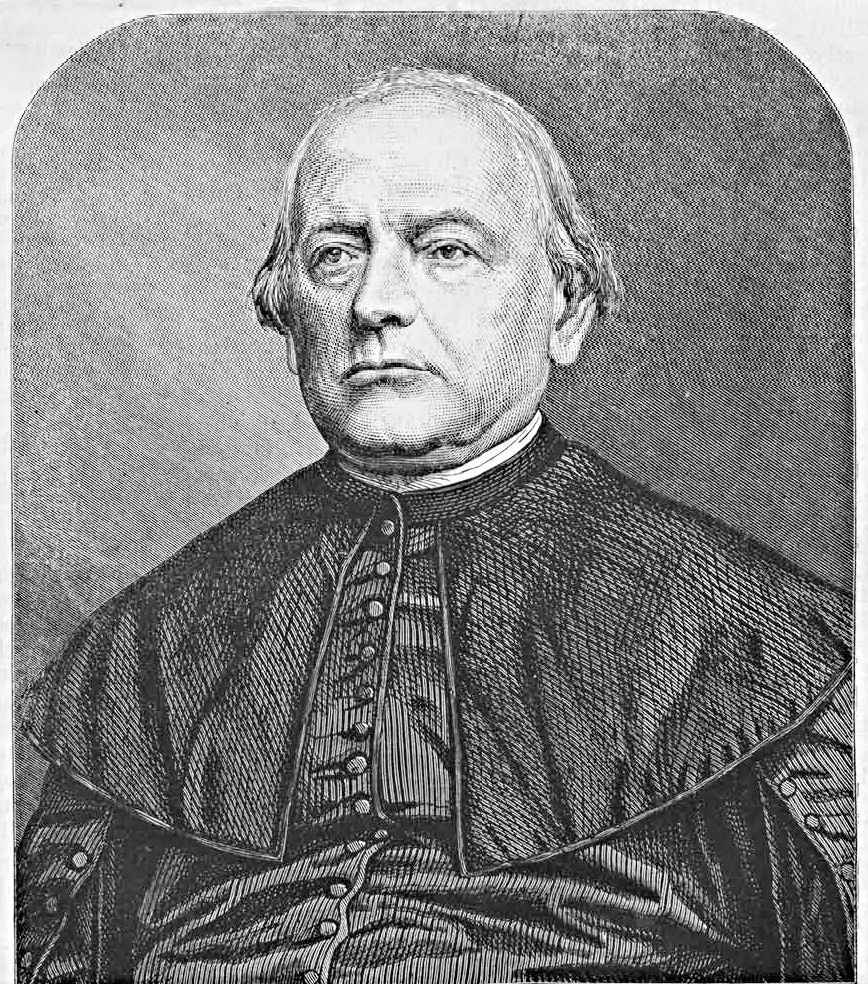

Minister of Religion and Education of Hungary
- In office 2 May 1849 – 11 August 1849
- Preceded by: Károly Szász
- Succeeded by: József Eötvös

Personal details
- Born: 20 October 1809; Szentes, Austrian Empire
- Died: 19 August 1878 (aged 68); Karlsbad, Austria-Hungary
- Political party: Independent
- Profession: priester, bishop

Mihály Horváth (20 October 1809, Szentes – 19 August 1878, Karlsbad) was a Hungarian Roman Catholic bishop, historian, and politician. He was an exponent of Hungarian nationalism with an emphasis on its historical culture.

Political offices
| Preceded by Lajos Batthyány | Minister of Religion and Education; 1849 | Succeeded by József Eötvös |
