= József Szlávy =

Hungarian and Austro-Hungarian politician

Noble József Szlávy de Érkenéz et Okány
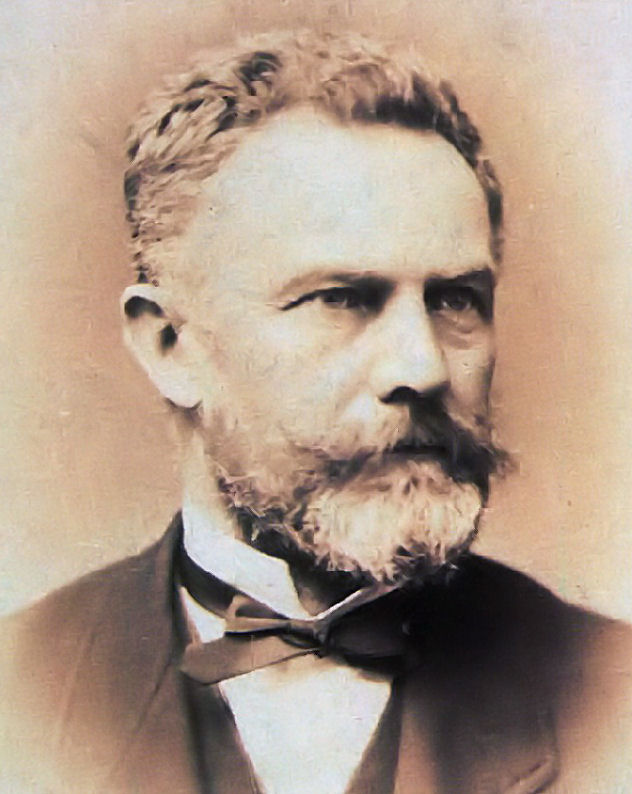

Prime Minister of the Kingdom of Hungary
- In office 4 December 1872 – 21 March 1874
- Monarch: Francis Joseph I
- Preceded by: Menyhért Lónyay
- Succeeded by: István Bittó

Personal details
- Born: 23 November 1818 Győr, Kingdom of Hungary, Austrian Empire
- Died: 8 August 1900 (aged 81) Zsitvaújfalu, Kingdom of Hungary, Austria-Hungary (today Nová Ves nad Žitavou, Slovakia)
- Party: Deák Party (1865–1875); Liberal Party (1875–1881)
- Spouse: never married
- Children: 0
- Education: Polytechnikum of Besztercebánya, Besztercebánya
- Profession: politician, mining engineer

József Szlávy de Érkenéz et Okány (23 November 1818 in Győr – 8 August 1900 Zsitvaújfalu, (today Nová Ves nad Žitavou, Slovakia)) was a Hungarian politician who served as prime minister from 1872 to 1874, as Speaker of the House of Representatives of the Kingdom of Hungary from 3 April 1879 to 12 April 1880 and as Speaker of the House of Magnates from 19 September 1894 to 3 October 1896. He was Minister of Finance of Austria-Hungary from 1880 to 1882.

Political offices
Preceded by István Gorove	Minister of Agriculture, Industry and Trade; 1870–1872	Succeeded by József Zichy
Preceded by József Eötvös	Minister of Religion and Education; Acting; 1871	Succeeded by Tivadar Pauler
Preceded by Menyhért Lónyay	Prime Minister of Hungary; 1872–1874	Succeeded by István Bittó
Preceded by Menyhért Lónyay	Minister of Defence; Acting; 1872	Succeeded by Béla Szende
Preceded by Károly Kerkapoly	Minister of Finance; 1873–1874	Succeeded by Kálmán Ghyczy
Preceded by Kálmán Ghyczy	Speaker of the House of Representatives; 1879–1880	Succeeded by Tamás Péchy
Preceded by Leopold Hofmann	Joint Minister of Finance of Austria-Hungary; 1880–1882	Succeeded by Béni Kállay
Preceded by Miklós Vay	Speaker of the House of Magnates; 1894–1896	Succeeded by Vilmos Tóth
