= Pál Rosty de Barkócz =

Hungarian nobleman, photographer and explorer

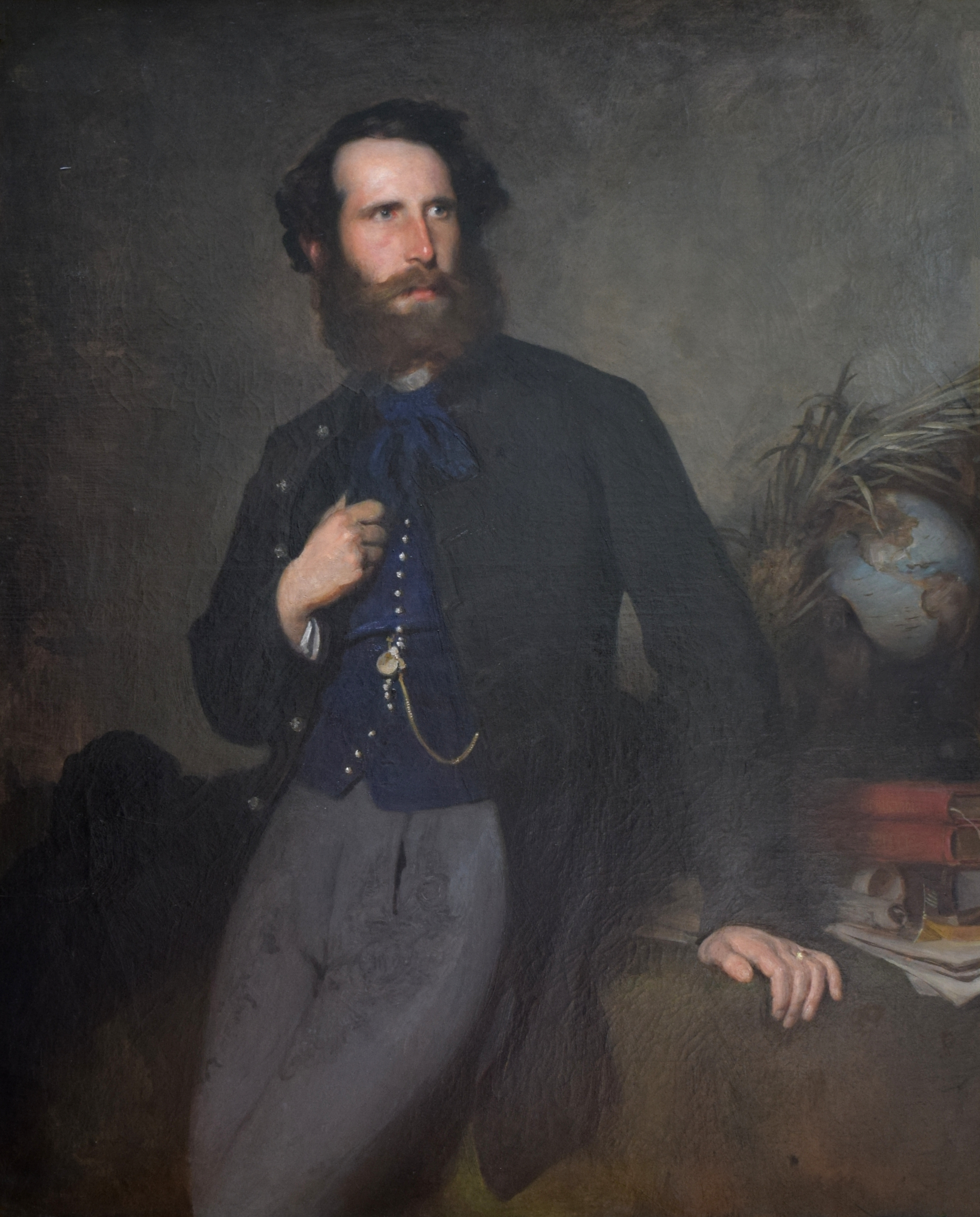
- His portrait by Bertalan Székely
- Born: 29 November 1830; Pest, Kingdom of Hungary
- Died: 7 December 1874 (aged 44); Dunapentele, Kingdom of Hungary
- Citizenship: Austro-Hungarian
- Known for: Expeditions to America
- Scientific career
- Fields: Geography
- Workplaces: Hungarian Academy of Sciences

Pál Rosty de Barkócz (pronunciation: ['pa:l 'rɔʃti 'bɒrkɔ:ʦ]; 29 November 1830 – 7 December 1874) was a Hungarian nobleman, photographer, and explorer.

== Life ==
The coat of arms of the Hungarian noble family Rosty de Barkócz

Born in Pest in the former Kingdom of Hungary. Pál István Ferenc, was a member of the illustrious ancient Roman Catholic Hungarian noble family Rosty de Barkócz (in Hungarian: barkóczi Rosty család). His father was Albert Rosty de Barkócz (1779–1847), jurist, landowner, vice-ispán of the county of Békés (alispán of Békés), and his mother was Anna Eckstein de Ehrenbergh (1801–1843). His paternal grandparents were Pál Rosty de Barkócz (1745–1810), first lieutenant, landowner, member of the Hungarian Jacobin front, and Anna Nedeczky de Nedecze (1764–1839). His great grandfather was Ferenc Rosty de Barkócz (1718–1790), royal counselor, vice-ispán of the Vas county, and a wealthy landowner during the Age of empress Maria Theresa. Pál Rosty was also, descendant of the ancient and prestigious medieval Hungarian noble Perneszy family, which died out in the 18th century. Pál Rosty de Barkócz's nephew was the Baron Loránd Eötvös de Vásárosnamény (1848–1919), physicist, engineer and politician, as his mother was Ágnes Rosty de Barkócz (1825–1913), Pál's sister.

The young Pál Rosty served as soldier in the Károlyi hussar during the Hungarian Revolution of 1848 against the Habsburgs. After the capitulation, Pál escaped from the Hungarian Kingdom and went to Munich with the help of his brother in law Agoston Trefort. There he studied biology and chemistry and soon he emigrated to Paris, where he got to known with the art of photography, which he learned and started practicing with great passion. Pál planned then an excursion to the Americas inspired by the experiences and discovering of his friend the old Baron Alexander von Humboldt. Pál left on 4 August 1856 by ship to the United Estates. He was in Texas, New Mexico, Mexico and then he traveled to the island of Cuba, staying in the Habana for several days. Then in 1857 he continued his trip to Venezuela, staying in Caracas for a very brief time, and then he left to the countryside to the Aragua state, after receiving the invitation of a local landowner of German origins, Franz Vollmer, who had a state named "El Palmar". After two years of travelling he arrived back to Hungary on 26 February 1859.

All his experiences, several drawings and plenty pictures were published in this anecdotal memories named "From America" (Pest, 1861). Once he traveled back to Europe, he visited to Berlin in 1859, where he gave personally a copy of his still unpublished memories to his friend Humboldt, who died months later. Since 1861, Pál Rosty de Barkócz was named member of the Hungarian Academy of Sciences. Since 1860, he lived in Pest and in his mansion of Dunapentele. In 1870 he became founder member of the Gentlemen's Casino of Dunapentele. From 1872 he was member of the juridic council of the Fejér county. In the decade of the 1870s his health got very weak, and moved definitely to his mansion of Dunapentele. There he died on 7 September 1874.

He never got married and was the last man descendant of his branch of the Rosty de Barkócz family.

== Bibliography ==
- Szinnyei József: Magyar írók élete és munkái XI. (Popeszku–Rybay). Budapest: Hornyánszky. 1906.
- Kenyeres Ágnes (főszerk.): Magyar életrajzi lexikon. Budapest, 1982.
