= István Bittó =

Hungarian politician

Count István Bittó de Sárosfa et Nádasd
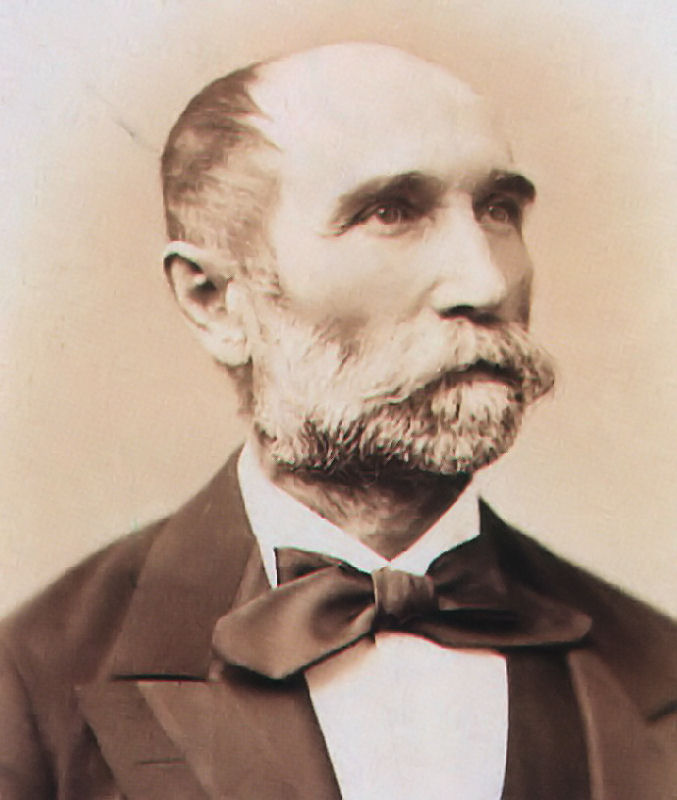

Prime Minister of the Kingdom of Hungary
- In office 21 March 1874 – 2 March 1875
- Monarch: Francis Joseph I
- Preceded by: József Szlávy
- Succeeded by: Béla Wenckheim

Personal details
- Born: 3 May 1822 Sárosfa, Kingdom of Hungary (now Blatná na Ostrove, Slovakia)
- Died: 7 March 1903 (aged 80) Budapest, Austria-Hungary
- Party: Deák Party (1865–1875); Moderate Opposition (1875–1884)
- Spouse: Mária Emilia Ágnes Lídia Irma Bittó de Nádasd et Sárosfalva

Count István Bittó de Sárosfa et Nádasd (3 May 1822 – 7 March 1903) was a Hungarian politician who served as Speaker of the House of Representatives of Hungary from 10 September 1872 to 23 March 1874 and as Prime Minister of Hungary from 1874 to 1875.

== Career ==
Bittó studied law and entered into a legal civil service. During the Revolution of 1848–49, he was a revolutionary and a member of the Diet of Hungary. He emigrated after the defeat of Hungary in 1849 out of the country, but returned in 1851. From 1861 Bittó was a parliamentarian in the newly convened parliament to the Liberal Party of Ferenc Deák.

After the compromise with Austria Bittó was the Deputy Speaker of the House of Representatives between 1869 and 1872. He served as justice minister in the government of Menyhért Lónyay from 1871 to 1872. On 1 March 1874 he was appointed by King Ferenc József prime minister. The office he held only until 2 March 1875 when he was replaced by Béla Wenckheim. In the era of Kálmán Tisza (1875–1890) he was one of the few former liberal oppositionists (he was the only Prime Minister who later joined to the opposition). From 1899 until his death, Bittó was a member of the House of Magnates.

== Private life ==
István was married to his cousin, Mária Emilia Ágnes Lídia Irma Bittó de Nádasd et Sárosfalva, the daughter of Szeraf Ferenc József Bittó de Nádasd et Sárosfalva and his wife, Mária Markovich de Zséna. They adopted a baby girl Czuni Julianna. Bittó Irma was previously married to a Huszar who died. It was not look well upon to be a widow during those times and she therefore married her cousin.

== Death ==
István Bittó died on 7 March 1903 in Budapest, at the age of 80.

Political offices
| Preceded by Boldizsár Horvát | Minister of Justice; 1871–1872 | Succeeded by Tivadar Pauler |
| Preceded by Pál Somssich | Speaker of the House of Representatives; 1872–1874 | Succeeded by Béla Perczel |
| Preceded by József Szlávy | Prime Minister of Hungary; 1874–1875 | Succeeded by Béla Wenckheim |
