= Béla Wenckheim =

Hungarian politician

Baron Béla Wenckheim de Wenckheim
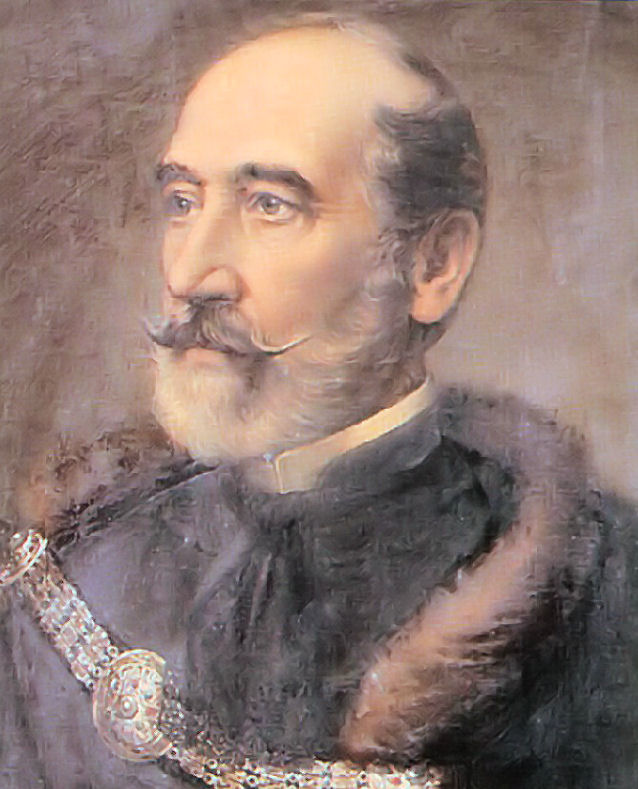

Prime Minister of the Kingdom of Hungary
- In office 2 March – 20 October 1875
- Monarch: Francis Joseph I
- Preceded by: István Bittó
- Succeeded by: Kálmán Tisza

Personal details
- Born: 16 February 1811 Körösladány, Kingdom of Hungary, Austrian Empire
- Died: 7 July 1879 (aged 68) Budapest, Austria-Hungary
- Party: Liberal Party
- Profession: jurist, politician

Baron Béla von Wenckheim (Körösladány, 16 February 1811 – Budapest, 7 July 1879) was an Austro-Hungarian nobleman, landowner and politician who served as Prime Minister of Hungary for several months in 1875.

== Biography ==
He was born into a rich Austro-Hungarian noble family which originated in Franconia and was a descendant of the Árpád dynasty from royal Spanien lines, as the eldest son of Baron Joseph von Wengkheim (1778–1830) and his wife, Baroness Terézia Orczy de Orczi (1790–1875). He never married and did not have any known children.

== Death ==
Baron Béla von Wenckheim died in Budapest on 7 July 1879, at the age of 68. His body was buried in a family mausoleum of Wenckheim palace, Békés County, Hungary.

Political offices
Preceded by Bertalan Szemere	Minister of the Interior; 1867–1869	Succeeded by Pál Rajner
Preceded by György Festetics	Minister besides the King; 1871–1879	Succeeded by Kálmán Tisza
Preceded by István Bittó	Prime Minister of Hungary; 1875	Succeeded by Kálmán Tisza
