= Minister of Public Works and Transport (Hungary) =

The minister of public works and transport of Hungary (Hungarian: Magyarország közmunka- és közlekedésügyi minisztere) was a member of the Hungarian cabinet from 1848 until 1889, when the ministry was merged into the Ministry of Trade. The last minister was Gábor Baross.

== Ministers of public works and transport (1848–1889) ==
=== Kingdom of Hungary (1848–1849) ===
Parties Opposition Party

#	Picture	Name	From	Until	Political party	Cabinet	Assembly (Election)
1		István Széchenyi (1791–1860)	16 April 1848	4 September 1848	Opposition Party	Batthyány	Last Diet
1		István Széchenyi (1791–1860)	16 April 1848	4 September 1848	Opposition Party	Batthyány	1 (1848)
—		Committee of National Defence	2 October 1848	2 May 1849	—	Committee of National Defence	1 (1848)
2		László Csány (1790–1849)	2 May 1849	11 August 1849	Opposition Party	Szemere	1 (1848)

After the collapse of the Hungarian Revolution of 1848, the Kingdom of Hungary became an integral part of the Austrian Empire until 1867, when dual Austro-Hungarian Monarchy was created.

=== Kingdom of Hungary (1867–1889) ===
Parties Deák Party/Liberal Party

#	Picture	Name	From	Until	Political party	Cabinet	Assembly (Election)
3		Imre Mikó (1805–1876)	20 February 1867	21 April 1870	Deák Party	Andrássy; DP	3 (1865)
3		Imre Mikó (1805–1876)	20 February 1867	21 April 1870	Deák Party	Andrássy; DP	4 (1869)
4		István Gorove (1819–1881)	21 April 1870	21 June 1871	Deák Party	Andrássy; DP	4 (1869)
5		Lajos Tisza (1832–1898)	21 June 1871	14 November 1871	Deák Party	Andrássy; DP	4 (1869)
5		Lajos Tisza (1832–1898)	14 November 1871	4 December 1872	Deák Party	Lónyay; DP	4 (1869)
5		Lajos Tisza (1832–1898)	14 November 1871	4 December 1872	Deák Party	Lónyay; DP	5 (1872)
5		Lajos Tisza (1832–1898)	4 December 1872	19 December 1873	Deák Party	Szlávy; DP	5 (1872)
6		József Zichy (1841–1924)	19 December 1873	21 March 1874	Deák Party	Szlávy; DP	5 (1872)
6		József Zichy (1841–1924)	21 March 1874	2 March 1875	Deák Party	Bittó; DP–BK	5 (1872)
7		Tamás Péchy (1828–1897)	2 March 1875	20 October 1875	Liberal Party	Wenckheim; SZP	5 (1872)
7		Tamás Péchy (1828–1897)	20 October 1875	14 April 1880	Liberal Party	K. Tisza; SZP	6 (1875)
7		Tamás Péchy (1828–1897)	20 October 1875	14 April 1880	Liberal Party	K. Tisza; SZP	7 (1878)
—		Gyula Szapáry (1832–1905) acting	14 April 1880	24 April 1880	Liberal Party	K. Tisza; SZP	7 (1878)
8		Pál Ordódy (1822–1885)	24 April 1880	9 August 1882	Liberal Party	K. Tisza; SZP	7 (1878)
8		Pál Ordódy (1822–1885)	24 April 1880	9 August 1882	Liberal Party	K. Tisza; SZP	8 (1881)
9		Gábor Kemény (1830–1888)	9 August 1882	19 September 1886	Liberal Party	K. Tisza; SZP	8 (1881)
9		Gábor Kemény (1830–1888)	9 August 1882	19 September 1886	Liberal Party	K. Tisza; SZP	9 (1884)
—		Béla Orczy (1822–1917) acting	19 September 1886	29 December 1886	Liberal Party	K. Tisza; SZP	9 (1884)
10		Gábor Baross (1848–1892)	29 December 1886	15 June 1889	Liberal Party	K. Tisza; SZP	9 (1884)
10		Gábor Baross (1848–1892)	29 December 1886	15 June 1889	Liberal Party	K. Tisza; SZP	10 (1887)

== See also ==
- List of heads of state of Hungary
- List of prime ministers of Hungary
- Politics of Hungary

Cabinet ministers

- Minister of Agriculture (Hungary)
- Minister of Civilian Intelligence Services (Hungary)
- Minister of Croatian Affairs of Hungary
- Minister of Defence (Hungary)
- Minister of Education (Hungary)
- Minister of Finance (Hungary)
- Minister of Foreign Affairs (Hungary)
- Minister of the Interior (Hungary)
- Minister of Justice (Hungary)
