= 1878 Hungarian parliamentary election =

- 5–14 August 1878

All 413 seats in the Diet 207 seats needed for a majority
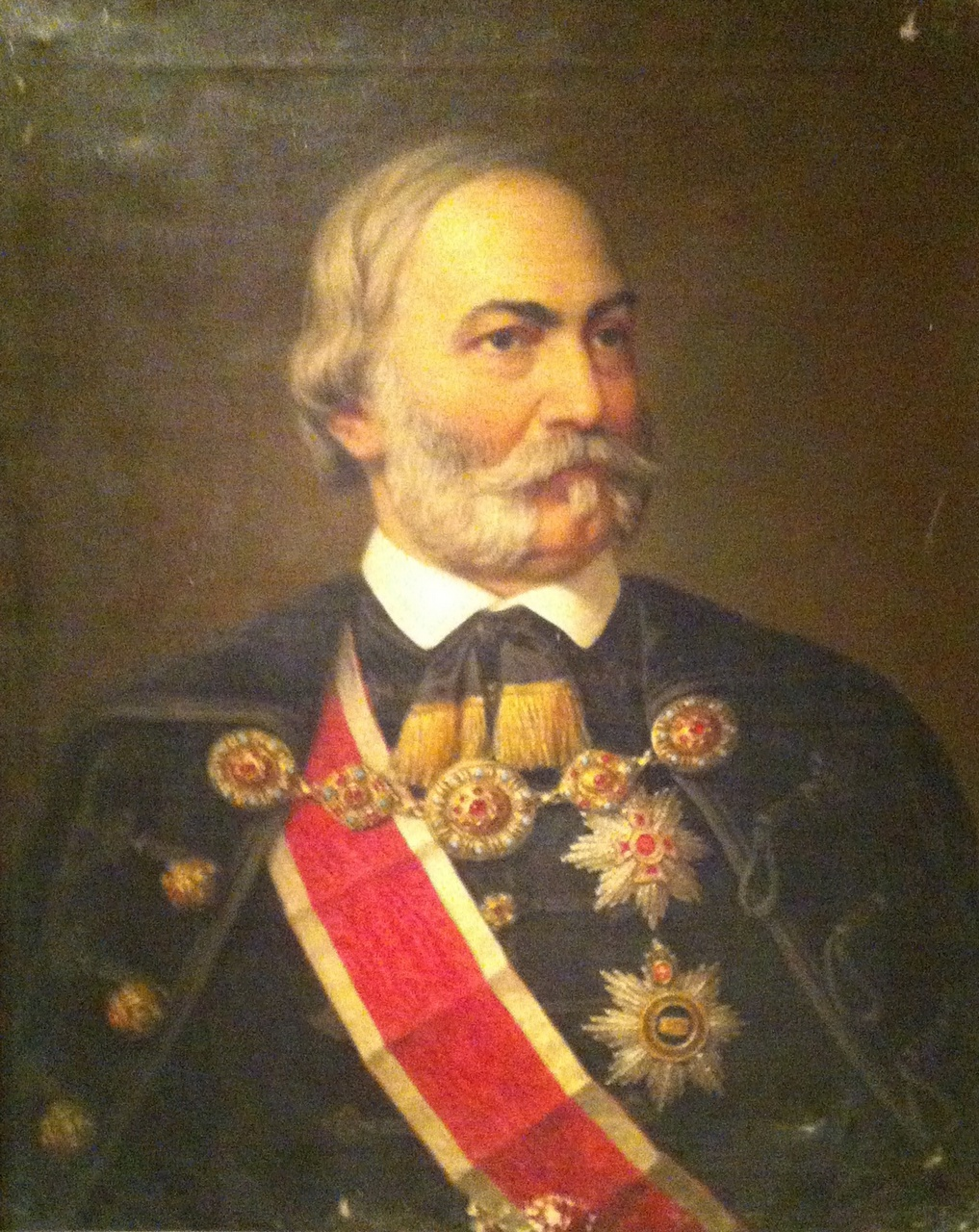

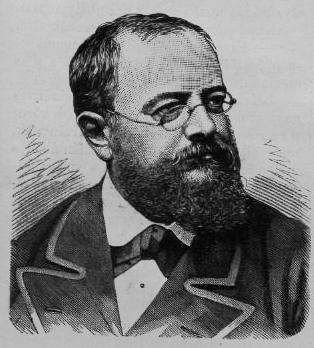

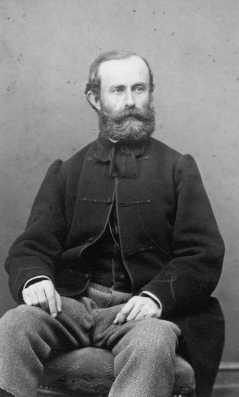
	First party	Second party	Third party
Leader	István Gorove	Béla Bánhidy	Lajos Mocsáry
Party	SZP	EE	FP
Seats won	237 / 413	82 / 413	69 / 413
Seat change	▼91	▲62	▲41
Percentage	57.39%	19.86%	16.71%
Prime Minister before election
Kálmán Tisza
SZP
Prime Minister after election
Kálmán Tisza
SZP

Parliamentary elections were held in Hungary between 5 and 14 August 1878. The entire parlamentary term was defined by the renegotiation of the customs and trade agreement, which was part of the Austro-Hungarian compromise with Cisleithania. The government initiated the negotiations and was ultimately forced to compromise on several issues, because of that a group left the Liberal Party and Kálmán Tisza resigned on 10 February 1877. But the monarch reappointed him and agreed to the renaming of the Austrian National Bank and the dual Austro-Hungarian leadership of it. After the treaty was accepted in December 1877, stones were thrown at the windows of the Sándor Palace in a demonstration against the prime minister. The government then restricted the rules about holding of demonstrations. The opposition demanded that Austria-Hungary join the Russo-Turkish War against the Russian Empire in 1878, but neither Cisleithania nor the emperor supported this. Franz Joseph I considered the acquisition of the Bosnia vilayet as a priority, which the Hungarian government had to support. The United Opposition was formed by the merger of the group of former members of the Liberal Party and the Right-Wing Opposition in April. The Liberal Party spent large sums of money to win over undecided voters, which ultimately led to an election victory. The new parliament convened on October 19, 1878.

== Parties and leaders ==
Party	Leader
Liberal Party (SZP)	István Gorove
United Opposition (EE)	Béla Bánhidy
Party of Independence (FP)	Lajos Mocsáry
Serbian People's Liberal Party (SNSS)	Mihailo Polit-Desančić
Party of 1848 (1848P)	Dániel Irányi
National Party of Romanians in Hungary (PNRBU)	Alexandru Mocioni

== Electoral system ==
The elections were based on property, income and education census. Landowners with a ¼ plot of land, rural industrialists paying a tax of 6 Ft, urban industrialists paying a tax of 10.50 Ft, house tenants paying a tax of 15.75 Ft, land and house owners paying a tax of 5 Ft, landless house owners paying a tax of 6 Ft, employed priests, officials, teachers, tutors, writers, artists, lawyers, notaries and health workers with a degree were electors. 20 years older men were eligible to vote and 24 years older men could be elected. Women had no right for the participation. The elections were held exclusively in single-member district by open voting.

== Results ==
Party	Seats	+/–
Liberal Party	237	-91
United Opposition	82	+62
Party of Independence	69	+41
Independent moderate	13	+12
Serbian People's Liberal Party	4	+1
Independent '67ers	4	-7
Party of 1848	2	-8
Independent '48ers	1	+1
National Party of Romanians in Hungary	1	-4
Total	413	–
Source: Ballabás-Pap-Pál

The group of independents are classified by their political position as 48'ers, 67'ers and moderate opposition.

== Aftermath ==
The government's economic policy included financial austerity measures: tax increases, borrowing, layoffs, office mergers, and bureaucracy reduction. With the abdication of Finance Minister Kálmán Széll in September the governmernt resigned too, but the king again asked Kálmán Tisza to become prime minister in November.
