= 1881 Hungarian parliamentary election =

- 24 June–3 July 1881

All 413 seats in the Diet 207 seats needed for a majority
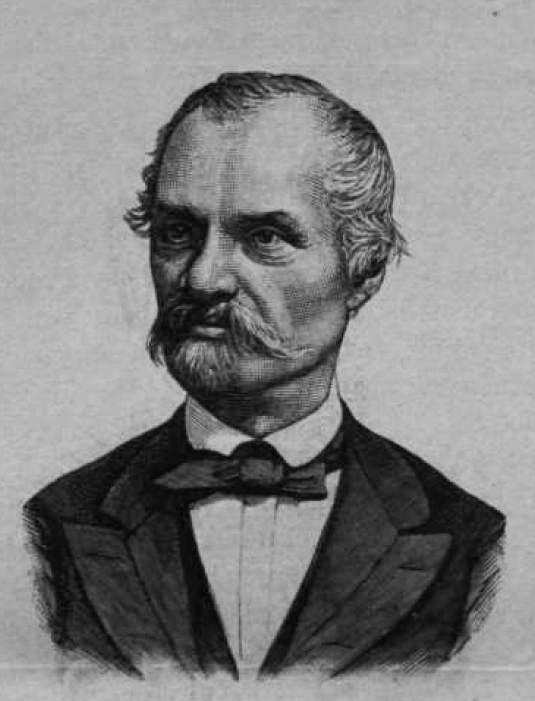

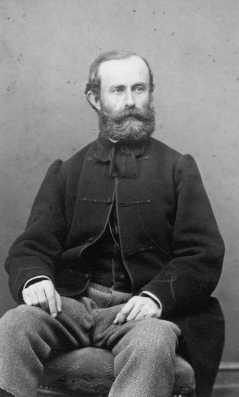

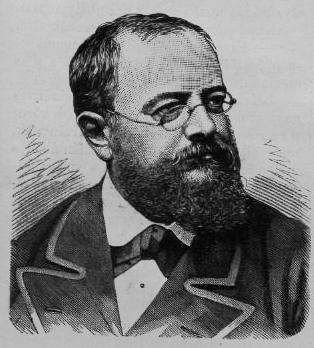
	First party	Second party	Third party
Leader	Gusztáv Vizsolyi	Lajos Mocsáry	Béla Bánhidy
Party	SZP	FP	ME
Seats won	236 / 413	91 / 413	70 / 413
Seat change	▼1	▲22	▼12
Percentage	57.14%	22.03%	16.95%
Prime Minister before election
Kálmán Tisza
SZP
Prime Minister after election
Kálmán Tisza
SZP

Parliamentary elections were held in Hungary between 24 June and 3 July 1881. The National Assembly passed the Hungarian Citizenship Act in 1879, which required citizens living abroad to apply for renewal of their citizenship within the next 10 years, otherwise they would lose it. Given that some of those who had fled after the Hungarian Revolution of 1848 were unwilling to do so, the opposition hoped that the time had come to defeat the Tisza government. The United Opposition rebranded as Moderate Opposition and the Liberal Party changed its president prior the election. Two Romanian parties in Transsylvania and in Hungary united as Romanian National Party. The new parliament convened on September 26, 1881.

== Parties and leaders ==
Party	Leader
Liberal Party (SZP)	Gusztáv Vizsolyi
Party of Independence (FP)	Lajos Mocsáry
Moderate Opposition (ME)	Béla Bánhidy
Serbian People's Liberal Party (SNSS)	Svetozar Miletić
Romanian National Party (PNR)	Nicolae Popea

== Electoral system ==
The elections were based on property, income and education census. Landowners with a ¼ plot of land, rural industrialists paying a tax of 6 Ft, urban industrialists paying a tax of 10.50 Ft, house tenants paying a tax of 15.75 Ft, land and house owners paying a tax of 5 Ft, landless house owners paying a tax of 6 Ft, employed priests, officials, teachers, tutors, writers, artists, lawyers, notaries and health workers with a degree were electors. 20 years older men were eligible to vote and 24 years older men could be elected. Women had no right for the participation. The elections were held exclusively in single-member district by open voting.

== Results ==
Party	Seats	+/–
Liberal Party	236	-1
Party of Independence	91	+22
Moderate Opposition	70	-12
Independent moderate	7	-6
Independent '67ers	5	+1
Serbian People's Liberal Party	3	-1
Romanian National Party	1	New
Total	413	–
Source: Ballabás-Pap-Pál

The group of independents are classified by their political position as 67'ers and moderate opposition.
