= 1887 Hungarian parliamentary election =

- 17–26 July 1887

All 413 seats in the Diet 207 seats needed for a majority
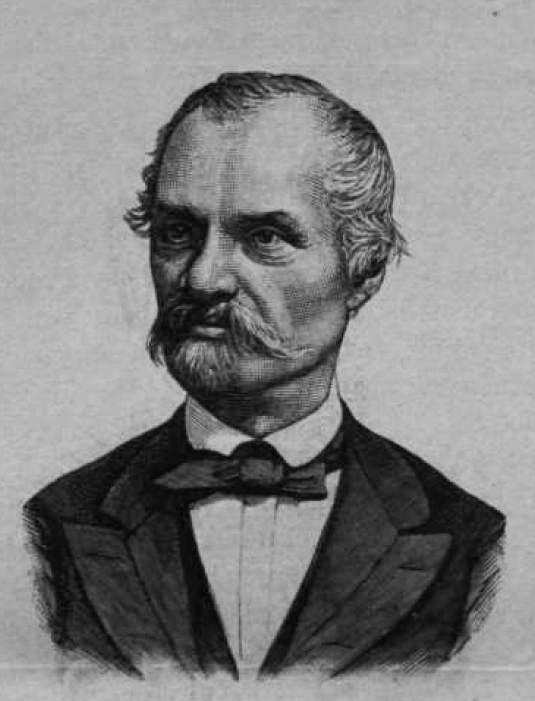

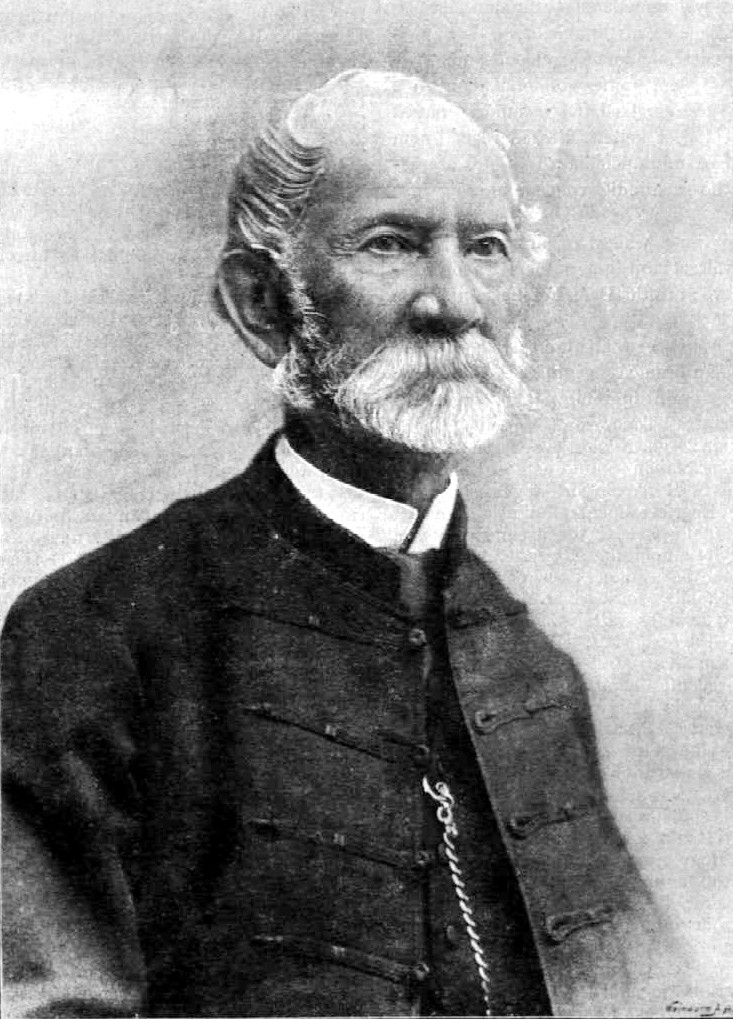

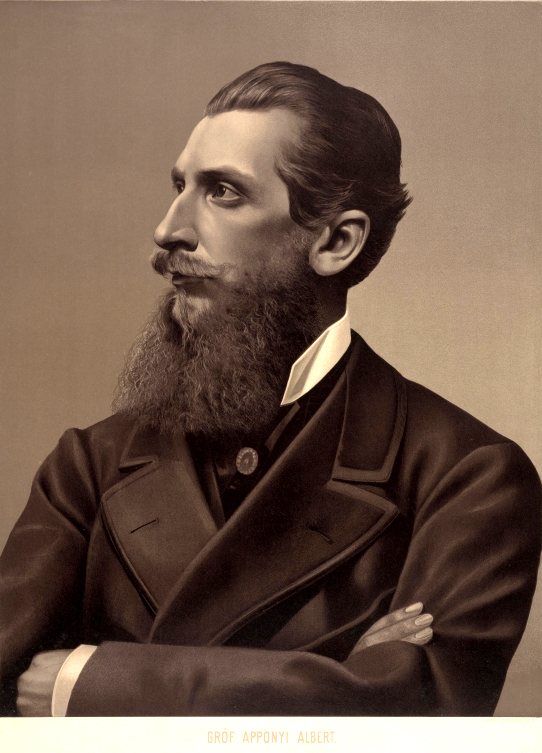
	First party	Second party	Third party
Leader	Gusztáv Vizsolyi	Dániel Irányi	Albert Apponyi
Party	SZP	48FP	ME
Seats won	256 / 413	79 / 413	47 / 413
Seat change	▲21	New	▼12
Percentage	61.99%	19.13%	11.38%
Prime Minister before election
Kálmán Tisza
SZP
Prime Minister after election
Kálmán Tisza
SZP

Parliamentary elections were held in Hungary between 17 and 26 July 1887. The period before the elections was characterized by the government's pro-industrial policy and the immutability of government policy (quieta non movere). Kálmán Tisza's government provided extensive benefits to mechanical engineering, construction, paper and printing companies. This was the last election held under the three-year parliamentary term, after that the length of parliamentary terms was increased to 5 years. The '48ers Party of Independence, formed from the merger of the Party of 1848 and the Party of Independence, appeared in the elections for the first time, and would later become the dominant force in the opposition. Nine people died and 12 were seriously injured during the election campaign. The new parliament convened on September 28, 1887.

== Parties and leaders ==
Party	Leader
Liberal Party (SZP)	Gusztáv Vizsolyi
'48ers Party of Independence (48FP)	Dániel Irányi
Moderate Opposition (ME)	Albert Apponyi
National Antisemitic Party (OASP)	Győző Istóczy
Romanian National Party (PNR)	George Bariț

== Electoral system ==
The elections were based on property, income and education census. Landowners with a ¼ plot of land, rural industrialists paying a tax of 6 Ft, urban industrialists paying a tax of 10.50 Ft, house tenants paying a tax of 15.75 Ft, land and house owners paying a tax of 5 Ft, landless house owners paying a tax of 6 Ft, employed priests, officials, teachers, tutors, writers, artists, lawyers, notaries and health workers with a degree were electors. 20 years older men were eligible to vote and 24 years older men could be elected. Women had no right for the participation. The elections were held exclusively in single-member district by open voting.

== Results ==
Party	Seats	+/–
Liberal Party	256	+21
'48ers Party of Independence	79	New
Moderate Opposition	47	-12
Independent moderate	13	3
National Antisemitic Party	10	-7
Independent '67ers	7	-4
Romanian National Party	1	-2
Total	413	–
Source: Ballabás-Pap-Pál

The group of independents are classified by their political position as 67'ers and moderate opposition.

== Aftermath ==
The government's pro-industrial policy strengthened the activities of agrarian movements, which led to the creation of a Ministry of Agriculture, independent of the Ministry of Industry and Trade. The government's downfall was caused by the army reform, in which the Prime Minister's compromise proposal was accepted, whith that lost the confidence of the monarch.
