= Gábor Baross =

Hungarian politician (1848–1892)

Noble Gábor Baross de Bellus
- Baross Gábor
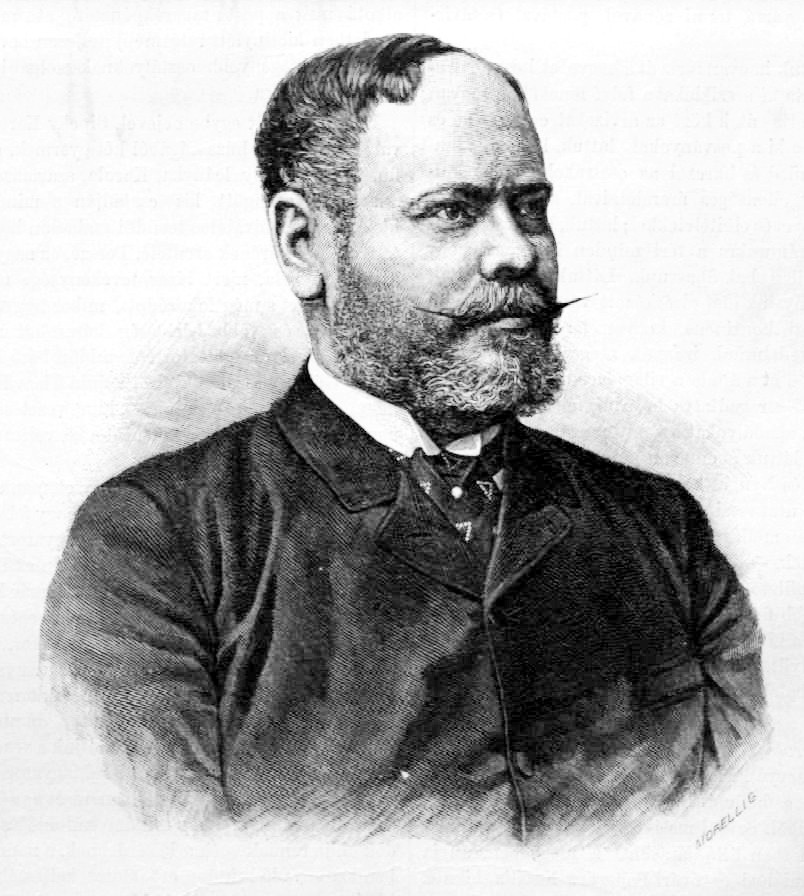
- Born: 6 July 1848; Barossháza, Kingdom of Hungary, Austrian Empire (now Pružina, Slovakia)
- Died: 8 May 1892 (aged 43); Iron-Gates Rapids, Austria-Hungary

Gábor Baross de Bellus (6 July 1848 – 8 May 1892) was a Hungarian politician in the Hungarian parliament, born at Barossháza, now Pružina near Trencsén (now Trenčín, Slovakia). He was for a time one of the professors there under Cardinal Kolos Vaszary. After acquiring considerable local reputation as chief notary of his county, he entered parliament in 1875, where he apparently gained a nickname "Slovak blackman" (tót szerecsen), due to his darker tanned complexity. He at once attached himself to Kálmán Tisza and remained faithful to his chief even after the Bosnian occupation had alienated so many of the supporters of the prime minister.

It was he who drew up the reply to the malcontents on this occasion, for the first time demonstrating his many-sided ability and his genius for sustained hard work. But it was in the field of economics that he principally achieved his fame. In 1883 he was appointed secretary to the ministry of ways and communications. Baross, who had prepared himself for quite another career, and had only become acquainted with the civilized West at the time of the Compromise of 1867, mastered, in an incredibly short time, the details of this difficult department. His zeal, conscientiousness and energy were so universally recognized, that on the retirement of Gábor Kemény, in 1886, he was appointed minister of ways and communications. He devoted himself especially to the development of the national railways, and the gigantic network of the Austro-Hungarian railway system and its unification was mainly his work.

But his most original creation in this respect was the zone system, which immensely facilitated and cheapened the circulation of all wares and produce, and brought the remotest districts into direct communication with the central point at Budapest. The amalgamation of the ministry of commerce with the ministry of ways in 1889 further enabled Baross to realize his great idea of making the trade of Hungary independent of foreign influences, of increasing the commercial productiveness of the kingdom and of gaining every possible advantage for her export trade by a revision of tolls. This patriotic policy provoked loud protests both from Austria and Germany at the conference of Vienna in 1890, and Baross was obliged somewhat to modify his system. This was by no means the only instance in which his commercial policy was attacked and even hampered by foreign courts. But wherever he was allowed a free hand he introduced epoch-making reforms in all the branches of his department, including posts, telegraphs, and so on.

A man of such strength of character was not to be turned from his course by any amount of opposition, and he rather enjoyed to be alluded to as "the iron-handed minister." The crowning point of his railway policy was the regulation of the Danube at the hitherto impassable Iron-Gates Rapids by the construction of canals, which opened up the eastern trade to Hungary and was an event of international importance. It was while inspecting his work there in March 1892 that he caught a chill, from which he died on 8 May. The day of his burial was a day of national mourning.

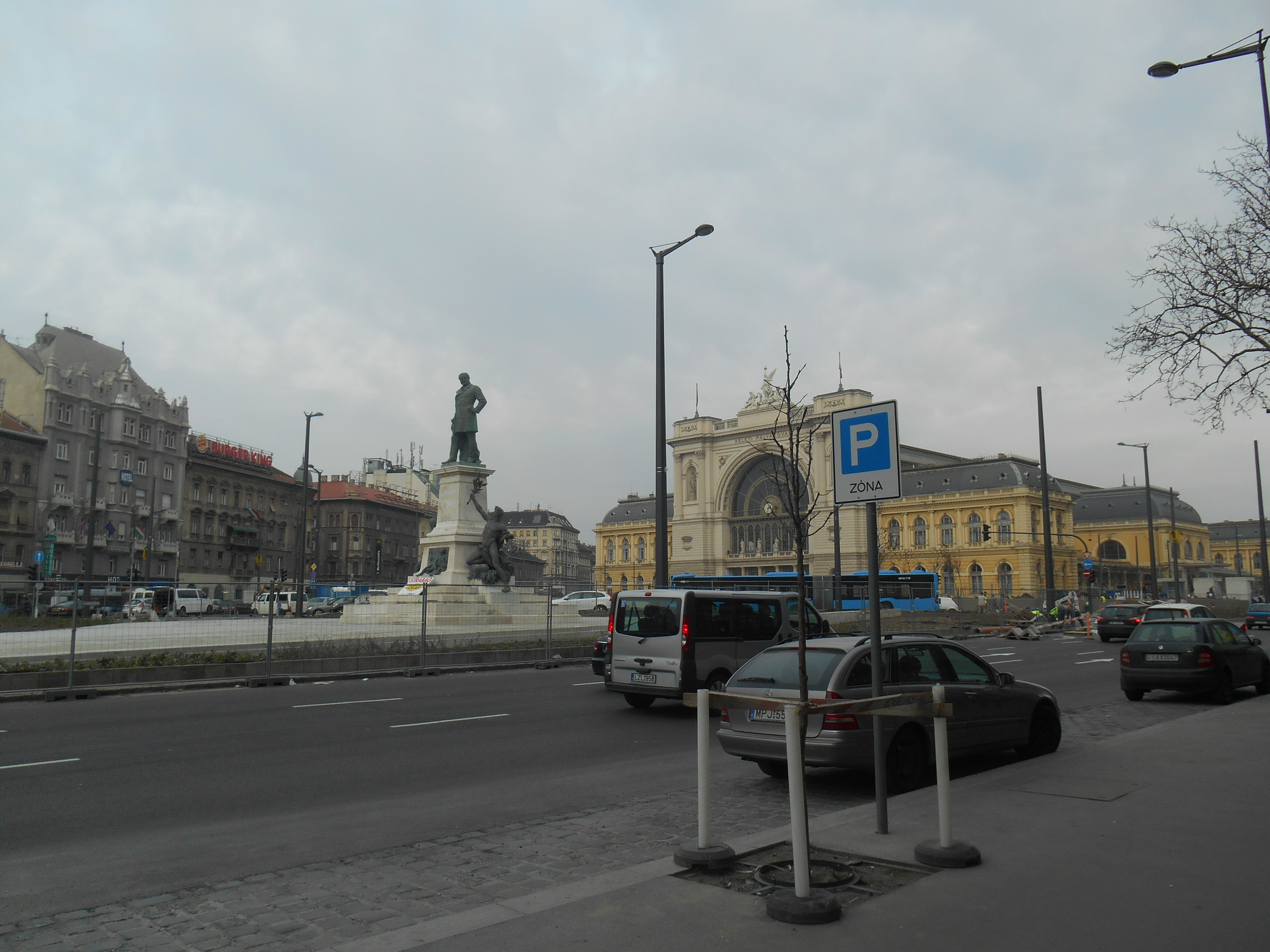
Baross tér in Budapest, with Keleti pályaudvar (Budapest Eastern Station Terminus) in the background. The statue of Baross was reinstated on 6 December 2013.

In Budapest today he is commemorated by a square (Hungarian: tér) named in his honour, Baross tér, at the front of Budapest Keleti railway station. A large bronze statue of him was reinstated there on 6 December 2013 after several years of major works for the new Budapest Metro Line 4.

Political offices
Preceded by Béla Orczy	Minister of Public Works and Transport; 1886–1889	Succeeded by office abolished
Preceded by Ágoston Trefort	Minister of Religion and Education; Acting; 1888	Succeeded by Albin Csáky
Preceded by Béla Orczy	Minister of the Interior; Acting; 1889	Succeeded by Géza Teleki
Preceded by office created	Minister of Trade; 1889–1892	Succeeded by Sándor Wekerle
