= 1884 Hungarian parliamentary election =

- 13–22 June 1884

All 413 seats in the Diet 207 seats needed for a majority
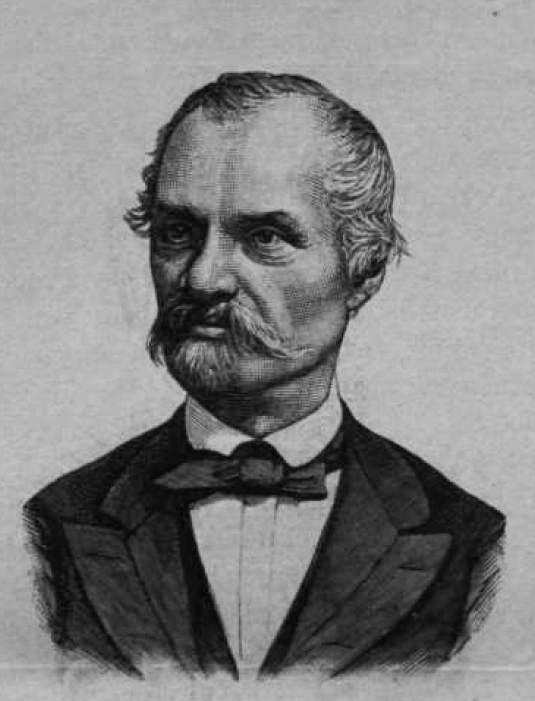

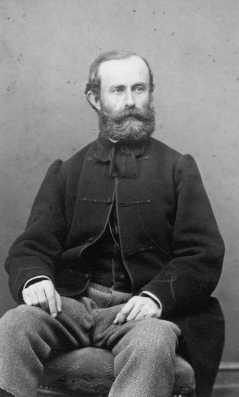

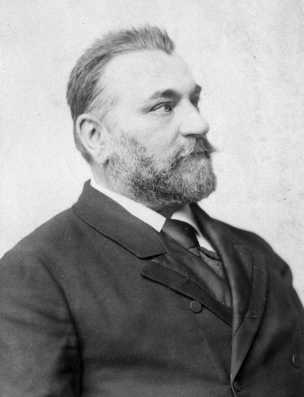
	First party	Second party	Third party
Leader	Gusztáv Vizsolyi	Lajos Mocsáry	Dezső Szilágyi
Party	SZP	FP	ME
Seats won	235 / 413	76 / 413	59 / 413
Seat change	▼1	▼15	▼11
Percentage	56.90%	18.40%	14.29%
Prime Minister before election
Kálmán Tisza
SZP
Prime Minister after election
Kálmán Tisza
SZP

Parliamentary elections were held in Hungary between 13 and 22 June 1884. The period before the elections was dominated by the Croatian crisis of 1883, when the Tisza's government had Hungarian-Croatian bilingual official emblems placed on Croatian official buildings. The Kingdom of Croatia-Slavonia had autonomy, which included its own elected parliament without own government. The Croatian crisis ultimately did not shake the ruling Liberal Party, after Franz Joseph I decided in favor of a bilingual system, what caused the abdication of Count Ladislav Pejačević, the Ban of Croatia-Slavonia. Prior the election the educational reform strengthened secondary schools with a focus on natural sciences, as opposed to schools with a focus on humanities. Within the opposition, the Party of Independence weakened and the National Antisemitic Party entered parliament, as a consequence of the Tiszaeszlár affair in 1882. The new parliament convened on September 27, 1884.

== Parties and leaders ==
Party	Leader
Liberal Party (SZP)	Gusztáv Vizsolyi
Party of Independence (FP)	Lajos Mocsáry
Moderate Opposition (ME)	Dezső Szilágyi
National Antisemitic Party (OASP)	Győző Istóczy
Romanian National Party (PNR)	George Bariț
Party of 1848 (1848P)	Dániel Irányi
Saxon People's Party (SVP)	Carl Wolff

== Electoral system ==
The elections were based on property, income and education census. Landowners with a ¼ plot of land, rural industrialists paying a tax of 6 Ft, urban industrialists paying a tax of 10.50 Ft, house tenants paying a tax of 15.75 Ft, land and house owners paying a tax of 5 Ft, landless house owners paying a tax of 6 Ft, employed priests, officials, teachers, tutors, writers, artists, lawyers, notaries and health workers with a degree were electors. 20 years older men were eligible to vote and 24 years older men could be elected. Women had no right for the participation. The elections were held exclusively in single-member district by open voting.

== Results ==
Party	Seats	+/–
Liberal Party (Note: 6 seats belonged to the Romanian Moderate Party)	235	-1
Party of Independence	76	-15
Moderate Opposition	59	-11
National Antisemitic Party	17	New
Independent '67ers	11	+6
Independent moderate	10	+3
Romanian National Party	3	+2
Party of 1848	1	+1
Saxon People's Party	1	New
Total	413	–
Source: Ballabás-Pap-Pál

The group of independents are classified by their political position as 67'ers and moderate opposition.

== Aftermath ==
After the elections, the Party of Independence merged with the Party of 1848 and became the leader of the opposition in the following years. The government's pro-industrial policy caused a livelihood crisis among those engaged in small crafts and cottage industries.
