= Lajos Tisza =

Hungarian politician

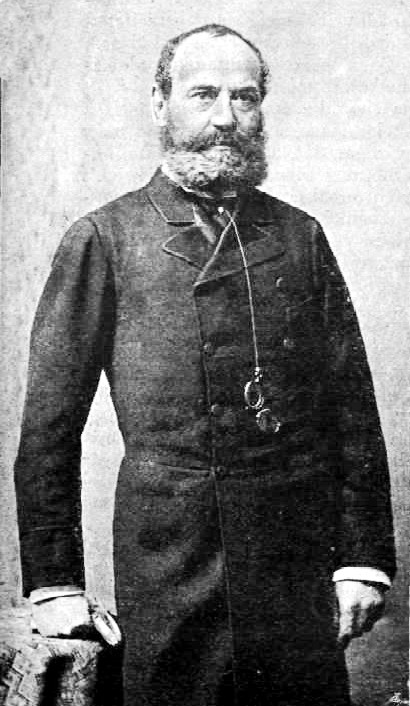

Minister besides the King of Hungary
- In office 19 November 1892 – 10 June 1894
- Preceded by: Géza Fejérváry
- Succeeded by: Gyula Andrássy the Younger

Personal details
- Born: 12 September 1832 Nagyvárad, Kingdom of Hungary
- Died: 26 January 1898 (aged 65) Budapest, Austria-Hungary
- Party: Deák Party, Liberal Party
- Profession: politician

Count Lajos Tisza de Borosjenő et Szeged (12 September 1832 - 26 January 1898) was a Hungarian politician, who served as Minister besides the King between 1892 and 1894. He was the younger brother of Kálmán Tisza and uncle of István Tisza. Tisza took part in the Hungarian politics from 1861, he was a supporter of the Austro-Hungarian Compromise of 1867. After the great flood at Szeged in 1879 he was the responsible for the reconstruction of the town. Szeged regards him as a hero since then because Lajos Tisza conducted the performance of the complicated task of the town's reconstruction with distinguished cooperation and a good organizational skill. Lajos Tisza received the title of Count from Emperor Franz Joseph for his works in the reconstruction of Szeged in 1883. However, the childless Lajos Tisza conferred his title on his politician nephew Stephen Tisza with the consent of the Monarch on 16 February 1897.

Until his death, he was the chairman of the National Association of Forestry. In Szeged, the Lajos Tisza Boulevard and the Széchenyi Square's sculpture cherishes his memory. The sculpture prepared by János Fadrusz in 1904, who said this about his masterpiece: "I will characterize junior Hungary, today's Hungary with this sculpture, not only Lajos Tisza. The heroes of the work are today's Hungary's heroes. That's why symbolic is the town of Szeged's story, our good king and our nation dared resolute and not slackened was reborne with his work."

Political offices
Preceded by István Gorove	Minister of Public Works and Transport; 1871–1873	Succeeded by József Zichy
Preceded by Géza Fejérváry	Minister besides the King; 1892–1894	Succeeded by Gyula Andrássy the Younger
