= Béla Orczy =

Hungarian politician and freedom fighter (1822–1917)

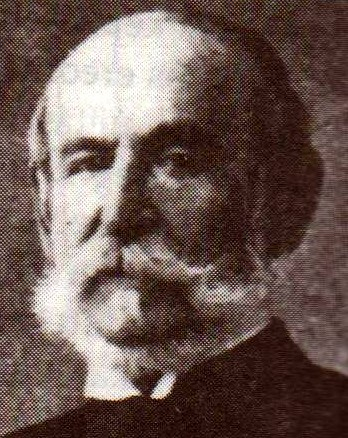

Minister of the Interior of Hungary
- In office 11 February 1887 – 22 March 1889
- Preceded by: Kálmán Tisza
- Succeeded by: Gábor Baross

Personal details
- Born: 16 January 1822; Pest, Kingdom of Hungary, Austrian Empire
- Died: 7 February 1917 (aged 95); Vienna, Austria-Hungary
- Political party: Deák Party, Liberal Party
- Profession: Soldier, politician

Baron Béla Orczy de Orczi (16 January 1822 – 7 February 1917) was a Hungarian politician and freedom fighter, who served as Interior Minister between 1887 and 1889. He was also Minister of Home Defence for several months in 1884. He took part in the Hungarian Revolution of 1848, he fought against the rebelling Serbs in the area of Délvidék. He was the de facto Minister of Foreign Affairs between 1879 and 1890. His paternal grandfather was the poet Lőrinc Orczy.

Gyula Andrássy secured Belá Orczy's appointment to the foreign ministry, as part of his effort to increase Hungarian influence in Austro-Hungarian foreign policy.

Political offices
Preceded by Kálmán Tisza	Minister besides the King; 1879–1890	Succeeded by László Szőgyény-Marich Jr.
Preceded by Gedeon Ráday	Minister of Defence; 1884	Succeeded by Géza Fejérváry
Preceded by Gábor Kemény	Minister of Public Works and Transport; Acting; 1886	Succeeded by Gábor Baross
Preceded by Kálmán Tisza	Minister of the Interior; 1887–1889	Succeeded by Gábor Baross
Preceded by László Szőgyény-Marich Sr.	Judge royal 1895–1917	Succeeded by Aurél Dessewffy
