= Pál Ordódy =

Hungarian politician

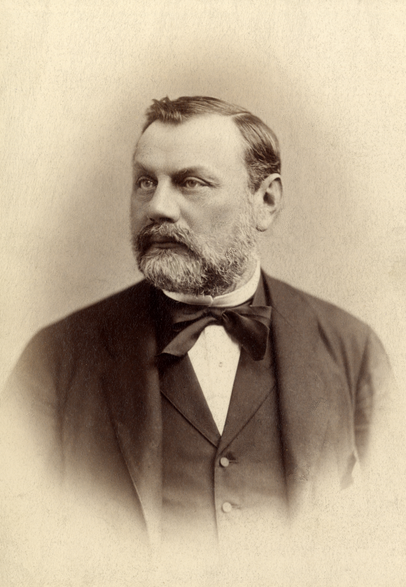

Minister of Public Works and Transport
- In office 24 April 1880 – 9 August 1882
- Preceded by: Gyula Szapáry
- Succeeded by: Gábor Kemény

Personal details
- Born: 26 August 1822 Pest, Hungary
- Died: 26 August 1885 (aged 63) Bad Ischl, Austria-Hungary
- Party: Deák Party; Liberal Party
- Profession: politician

Pál Ordódy de Ordód et Rozsonmiticz (26 August 1822 – 26 August 1885) was a Hungarian politician, who served as Minister of Public Works and Transport from 1880 to 1882.

Political offices
Preceded by Gyula Szapáry	Minister of Public Works and Transport; 1880–1882	Succeeded by Gábor Kemény
