= Škultéty =

Škultéty (Slovak spelling) or Skultéty (Hungarian spelling) is a surname originated from the German word Schultheiß. Notable people with this surname include:

- August Horislav Škultéty (1819-1892), Slovak writer, pedagogue, and ethnographer
- László Skultéty (1738-1831), the longest serving Hungarian Hussar in Hungarian history
- Jozef Škultéty (1853-1948), Slovak literary critic, historian, linguist, publicist and translator
- Ján Škultéty (1923-2011), Slovak and Czechoslovak Communist politician and M.P.
- Michaela Škultéty (born 1972) – Czech translator from German
- Vladimir Škultéty (born 1985) – Slovak polyglot
