= Gábor Kemény =

Gábor Kemény may refer to:

- Gábor Kemény (politician, 1830–1888), Hungarian politician
- Gábor Kemény (politician, 1910–1946), Hungarian politician
