= 1875 Hungarian parliamentary election =

Elections in Hungary

- 1 July–18 August 1875

All 413 seats in the Diet 207 seats needed for a majority
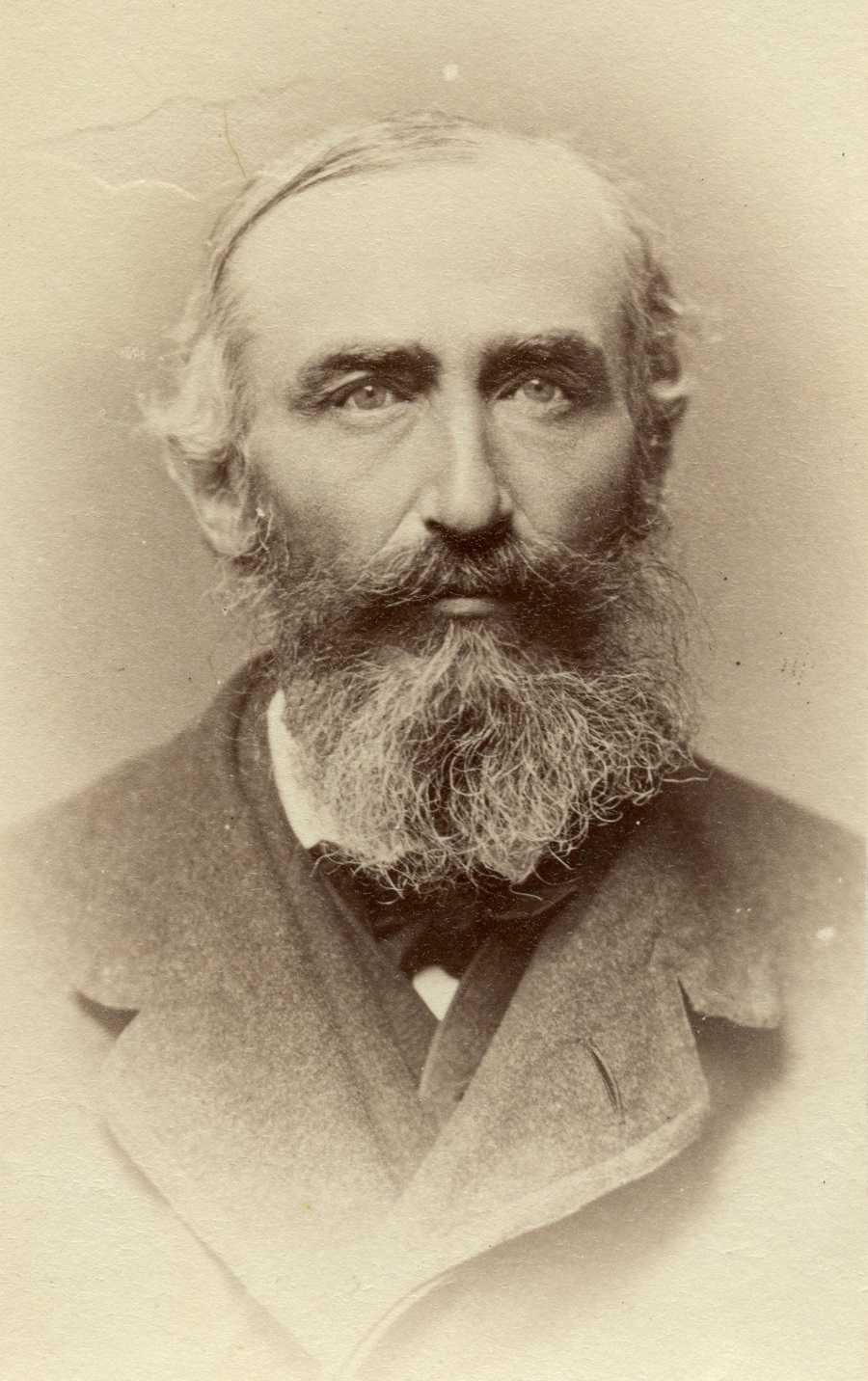

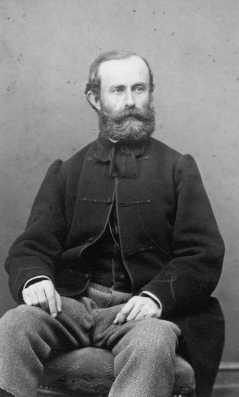

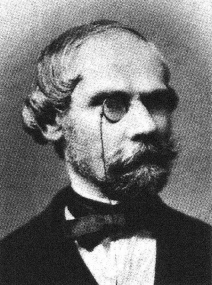
	First party	Second party	Third party
Leader	Kálmán Tisza	Lajos Mocsáry	Pál Sennyey
Party	SZP	FP	JE
Seats won	328 / 413	28 / 413	20 / 413
Seat change	New	New	New
Percentage	79.42%	6.78%	4.84%
Prime Minister before election
Béla Wenckheim
SZP
Prime Minister after election
Kálmán Tisza
SZP

Parliamentary elections were held in Hungary between 1 July and 18 August 1875. This was the first election held under Act XXXIII of 1874, which amended and unified the electoral rules, those with tax arrears were excluded from the elections, and 6-7% of the population had the right to vote. The economic crisis of 1873 also affected the balance of power within the party politics. The prime minister changed frequently and successive governments were unable to overcome the crisis, so a grand coalition was needed. The merger of the Deák Party and the Left Centre led to the formation of the Liberal Party in 1875, led by Kálmán Tisza, which became the ruling party in government for the next 30 years. Those who disagreed with the merger formed new parties. The Party of Independence was founded in 1874 by the independentists from the Left Centre, led by Lajos Mocsáry. The conservatives from the Deák Party, led by Baron Pál Sennyey, formed the Right-Wing Opposition. The elections were referred to by contemporaries as the cleanest elections in Austria-Hungary. The new parliament convened on August 30, 1875.

== Parties and leaders ==
Party	Leader
Liberal Party (SZP)	Kálmán Tisza
Party of Independence (FP)	Lajos Mocsáry
Right-Wing Opposition (JE)	Pál Sennyey
Party of 1848 (1848P)	Dániel Irányi
National Party of Romanians in Hungary (PNRBU)	Alexandru Mocioni
Serbian People's Liberal Party (SNSS)	Svetozar Miletić
National Party of Romanians in Transylvania (PNRT)	Ilie Macelaru

== Electoral system ==
The elections were based on property, income and education census. Landowners with a ¼ plot of land, rural industrialists paying a tax of 6 Ft, urban industrialists paying a tax of 10.50 Ft, house tenants paying a tax of 15.75 Ft, land and house owners paying a tax of 5 Ft, landless house owners paying a tax of 6 Ft, employed priests, officials, teachers, tutors, writers, artists, lawyers, notaries and health workers with a degree were electors. 20 years older men were eligible to vote and 24 years older men could be elected. Women had no right for the participation. The elections were held exclusively in single-member district by open voting.

== Results ==
Party	Seats	+/–
Liberal Party	328	New
Party of Independence	28	New
Right-Wing Opposition	20	New
Independent '67ers	11	+11
Party of 1848	10	-27
Independent Saxons	6	New
National Party of Romanians in Hungary	5	0
Serbian People's Liberal Party	3	0
Independent moderate	1	+1
National Party of Romanians in Transylvania	1	0
Total	413	–
Source: Ballabás-Pap-Pál

The group of independents are classified by their political position as 67'ers, moderate opposition or ethnic minority.

== Aftermath ==
The president of the Serbian People's Liberal Party was arrested in 1876 on charges of collaborating with Serbian insurgents in Herzegovina and inciting an uprising in Hungary. Svetozar Miletić sentenced to 5 years in prison, but was released after the next election in 1879.
