= Town hall in Banská Štiavnica =

Coordinates: 48.45377°N 18.91670°E

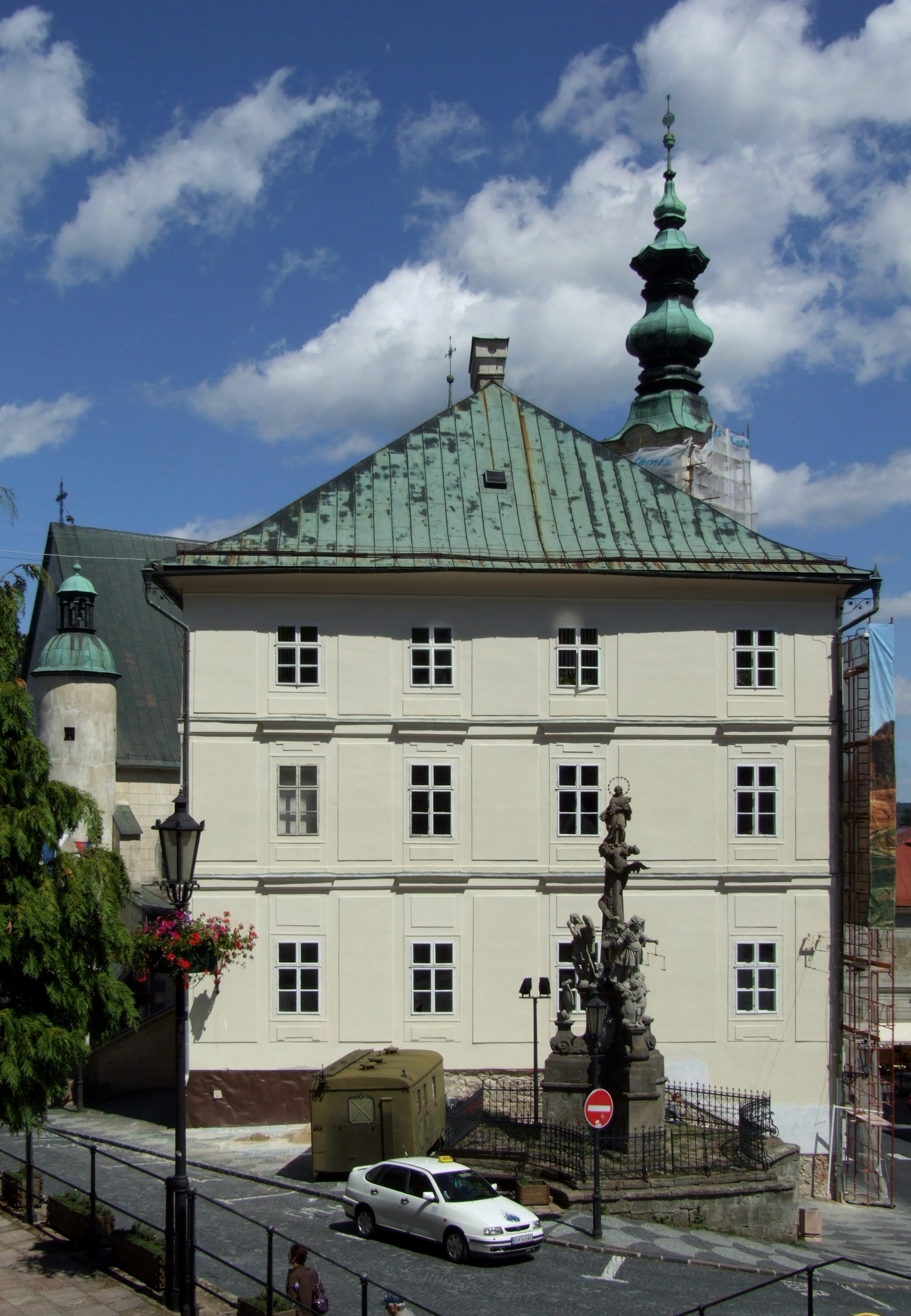
Town hall

The town hall in Banská Štiavnica existed in the 14th century, as a ground floor house in Gothic style, with the name "Stuba Praetoriana" or "Stuba Judicis". Between 1507 and 1679 it was modified and extended in Renaissance style. The Chapel of St. Anna was attached to the building but was demolished in the 18th century and, in its place, a sculpture of the Virgin Mary was built.

Today's Baroque appearance was given by Štiavnica's master mason, Pircker, in the years 1787–88. Constructional cost was 8,444 florins and 15 kreutzers. A town prison was situated in the basement of the town hall. The beginning of a market was announced from a tower of the town hall.

== Notable events ==
In the council chamber of the town hall a treaty was signed on 22 October 1704. This was a peace treaty between the Prince of Transylvania, Francis II Rákóczi and representatives of Emperor Leopold I. Envoys of the English and Dutch governments also participated.

== Notable features ==
Two out of Stiavnica's seven "legendary wonders" relate to the town hall. One is the clocks on the tower, whose hands are swapped. The big hand shows hours and the small one minutes. Another Stiavnica wonder which belongs to town hall is the entrance, which is not on the front side as expected but on the back. The story goes that it was because members of the council did not want people to know when they ended their meetings so that they could vanish to surrounding taverns.

== World heritage site ==
The flag of UNESCO flies beside the national flag of Slovakia in front of the entrance to the town hall. On the right side of the entrance is situated a memorial tablet which reads (in Slovak):

The historical city of Banská Štiavnica and its surroundings were entered into the list of world cultural heritage on December 9, 1993 as confirmation of their rare cultural value, which deserves protection for the benefit of the whole of mankind.
