= Imre Mikó =

Hungarian statesman, politician, economist, historian and patron

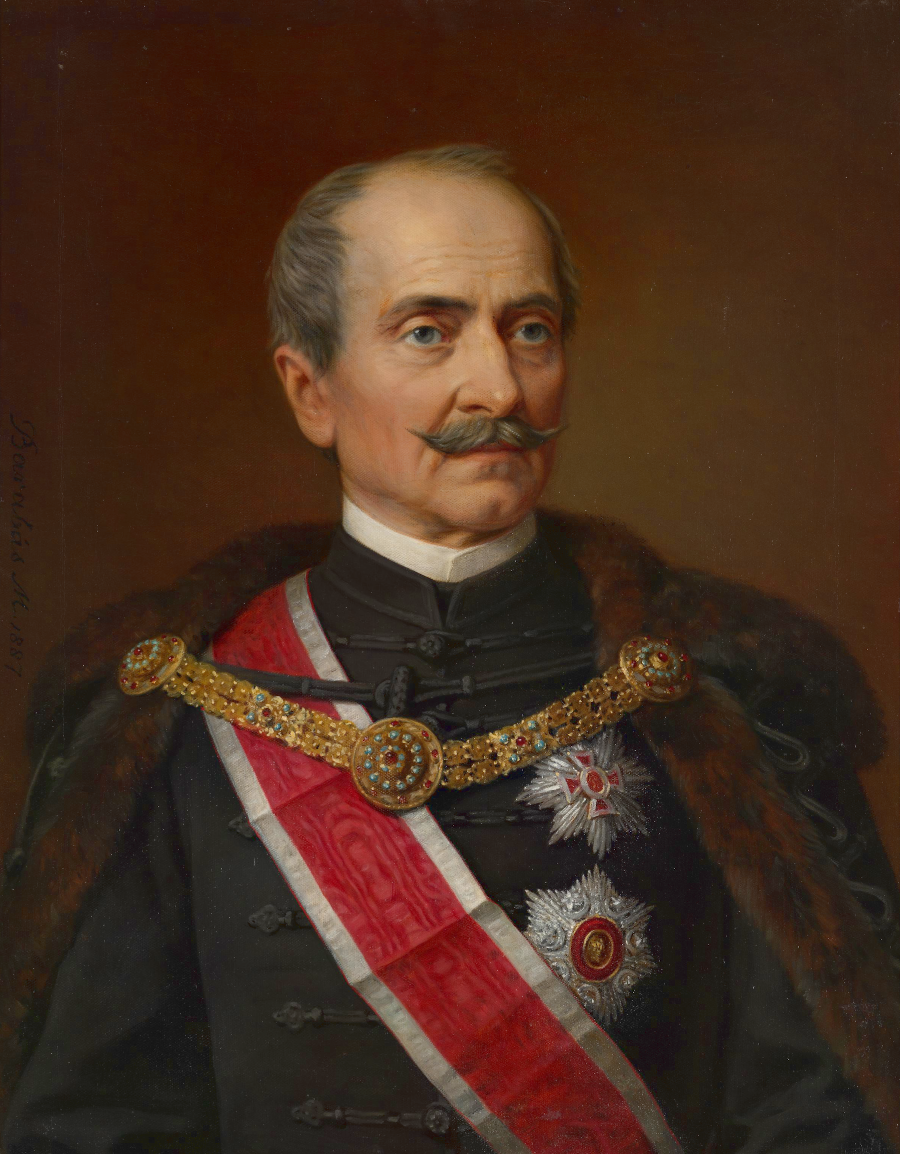
- Portrait by Miklós Barabás (detail)

Minister of Public Works and Transport of Hungary
- In office 20 February 1867 – 21 April 1870
- Preceded by: László Csány
- Succeeded by: István Gorove

Governor of Transylvania
- In office 10 December 1860 – 21 November 1861
- Preceded by: Friedrich Liechtenstein (as military and civil governor)
- Succeeded by: Ludwig Folliot de Crenneville (as Chairman of the Gubernium)

Chairman of the Gubernium of Transylvania
- In office 14 November 1848 – 22 December 1848
- Preceded by: József Teleki (as Governor)
- Succeeded by: Miklós Vay (as Royal Commissioner)

Personal details
- Born: 4 September 1805 Zabola, Transylvania, Kingdom of Hungary (today: Zăbala, Romania)
- Died: 16 September 1876 (aged 71) Kolozsvár, Austria-Hungary (today: Cluj-Napoca, Romania)
- Party: Address Party, Deák Party
- Profession: politician

Count Imre Mikó de Hidvég (4 September 1805 – 16 September 1876) was a Hungarian statesman, politician, economist, historian and patron from Transylvania, who served as Minister of Public Works and Transport between 1867 and 1870. He was one of the liberal-oriented, prominent figures of the politics of Transylvania in the 19th century. He functioned as Governor of Transylvania twice (1848 and 1860–1861). He worked tirelessly for the rise of his home in economic, cultural and scientific areas, earning the honorary title of "Széchenyi of Transylvania".

== Biography ==
He started his political career as an official of the Gubernium (the Government of Transylvania) in 1826, and reached the position of Treasurer in 1847, at the same time he became a leading figure of the liberal opposition in Transylvania. He was appointed interim, then actual Governor during the Hungarian Revolution of 1848. He presided the Székely National Assembly in Agyagfalva (today: Lutița, Romania), which supported the Hungarian War of Independence.

After defeat of the uprising, he retired from politics for a time as a follower of the Passive Resistance. He only devoted his life to the advancement of the economical and cultural life of Transylvania until the 1860s. He participated in the foundations of Transylvanian Economical Association (1854) and Transylvanian Museum Society (1859). Besides these, he had also important role in the establishment of the Franz Joseph University at Kolozsvár (today: Cluj-Napoca, Romania) in 1872.

He sponsored the National Theatre of Kolozsvár, encouraged the emergence of modern education and agriculture and actively took part in the cases of Calvinist Diocese of Transylvania. He edited and published the three volumes of Erdélyi történelmi adatok ("Historical data handbook of Transylvania"), with this he created an essential forum of the Transylvanian historiography as an organizer of science, but he himself also wrote historical studies.

He politicized since the 1860s again, firstly as Governor of Transylvania, later than Member of Parliament for Kolozsvár in the National Assembly of 1865. He served as Minister of Public Works and Transport in the Cabinet of Gyula Andrássy, the first government of Hungary after the Austro-Hungarian Compromise of 1867. He was associated with the construction of railway between Hungary and Transylvania, as well as the foundation of the state railway company, the predecessor of today's Hungarian State Railways (Magyar Államvasutak – MÁV).

Political offices
Preceded by László Csány	Minister of Public Works and Transport; 1867–1870	Succeeded by István Gorove
