= László Skultéty =

Hungarian hussar (1738 – 1831)

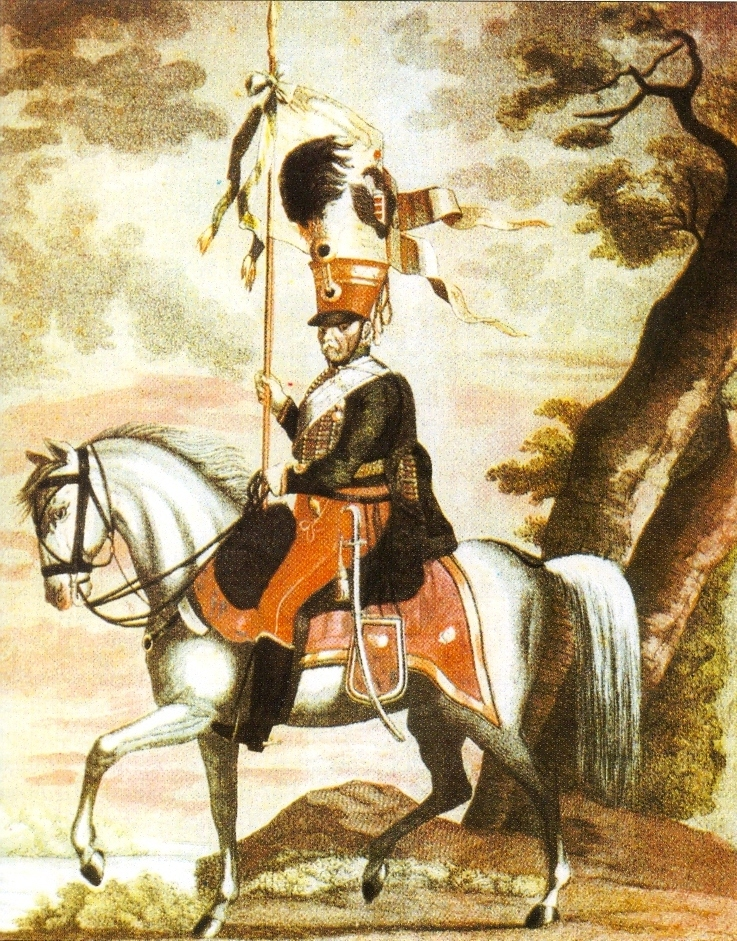
- Born: Ladislaus Gabrizech; June 27, 1738; Hegyesmajtény, Kingdom of Hungary (now Mojtín, Slovakia)
- Died: August 19, 1831 (aged 93); Arad, Kingdom of Hungary, Austrian Empire (now Romania)
- Other name: Ladislav Škultéty-Gábriš
- Occupation: Hussar
- Known for: Oldest hussar in the Kingdom of Hungary

László Skultéty (Slovak: Ladislav Škultéty-Gábriš, June 27, 1738 – August 19, 1831) was a hussar in the Kingdom of Hungary. He is the longest serving soldier in history, as he served 81 years as a cavalryman before his retirement. He fought in 256 battles during 22 military campaigns, surviving the rule of four emperors.

== Biography ==
He was born on 27 June 1738 in Hegyesmajtény (now Mojtín, Slovakia), then part of Barossháza (now Pružina, Slovakia) in the Kingdom of Hungary. According to his birth certificate, he was called Ladislaus Gabrizech. He was a son of Georgius Gabrizech and Catharina Kowacze (ch?).

According to contemporary sources, he spoke Hungarian, German, Slovak, Latin and partially French. He volunteered for the Ghilányi Hussar regiment when he was 12, after his mother's death. Skultéty served under András Hadik during the Seven Years' War, and participated in the capture of the Prussian capital, Berlin. He was awarded two high awards of the Habsburg army Silver Medal for Bravery and Military Cross. He died in a field hospital at the age of 93 in Kisszentmiklós (today part of Arad, Romania). He donated his life savings to his birthplace Mojtín and his last will was to build a church and a school there. His tomb was renovated in 1898, when citizens of Arad erected an obelisk.

There are contradicting views regarding his ethnicity. In Slovakia, he is generally viewed as Slovak due to his birthplace, and in Hungary as Hungarian, considering his political nationality. For both nations Skultéty figured as a sort of role model in several works of art and poetry. This question probably cannot be answered due to the lack of any decisive records. Róbert Hermann, a doctor of the Hungarian Academy of Sciences, called into question the extent of which the choice of ethnicity prevailed during Skultéty's time. He doesn't think that being born in a majority Slovak village makes him necessarily a Slovak (or if he did himself identify as one), but it cannot be ruled out either. Hermann sees a dual identity also as a possibility in his case.

== Controversial reburial ==
In 2013, his remains were exhumed and buried in his native village with respect to the planned abolishment of the old cemetery in Arad and per agreement between Slovak and Romanian public authorities. The action caused outrage in the Hungarian government because Skultéty's grave in Arad was one of the many Hungarian cultural heritage sites and Budapest was not notified about the planned exhumation. Zsolt Semjén, the Deputy Prime Minister of Hungary, said that "Slovakia has to stop the falsification of history". The reburial was held on 27 June 2013.

== Literary works ==
Several works of art were made in honor of Skultéty.

Slovak writer Ján Martíš, himself also born in Mojtín, wrote two books about Skultéty: Cisársky večný vojak (Imperial eternal soldier) in 1970 and V službách štyroch cisárov (In the service of four emperors) in 1977.
