= Coins of the Austro-Hungarian gulden =

Austro-Hungarian gulden coins were minted following the Ausgleich with different designs for the two parts of the empire.

== Coins of Hungary ==
Coins of Hungary – regular issues
| Image | | Value | Diameter | Description | | | Date of first minting |
| Obverse | Reverse | Value | Diameter | Edge | Obverse | Reverse | Date of first minting |
|---|---|---|---|---|---|---|---|
| | | 5/10 krajczár | 17 mm | | "MAGYAR KIRÁLYI VÁLTÓ PÉNZ"^{1}, Middle coat of arms | Value, year of minting, mintmark | 1882 |
| | | 1 krajczár | 19 mm | | "MAGYAR KIRÁLYI VÁLTÓ PÉNZ", Small coat of arms with angels | Value, year of minting, mintmark | 1868 |
| | | 1 krajczár | 19 mm | | "MAGYAR KIRÁLYI VÁLTÓ PÉNZ", Middle coat of arms | Value, year of minting, mintmark | 1878 |
| | | 1 krajczár | 19 mm | | "MAGYAR KIRÁLYI VÁLTÓ PÉNZ", Middle coat of arms (including Fiume) | Value, year of minting, mintmark | 1891 |
| | | 4 krajczár | 27 mm | | "MAGYAR KIRÁLYI VÁLTÓ PÉNZ", Small coat of arms with angels | Value, year of minting, mintmark | 1868 |
| | | 10 krajczár | 18 mm | | "FERENCZ JÓZSEF A. CSÁSZÁR MAGYARORSZÁG AP. KIRÁLYA"^{2}, I Ferenc József | "VÁLTÓ PÉNZ"^{3}, value, year of minting, mintmark | 1867 |
| | | 10 krajczár | 18 mm | | "FERENCZ JÓZSEF A. CSÁSZÁR MAGYARORSZÁG AP. KIRÁLYA", I Ferenc József, mintmark | "VÁLTÓ PÉNZ", value, year of minting | 1868 |
| | | 10 krajczár | 18 mm | | "FERENCZ JÓZSEF A. CSÁSZÁR MAGYARORSZÁG AP. KIRÁLYA", I Ferenc József, mintmark | "MAGYAR KIRÁLYI VÁLTÓ PÉNZ", value, year of minting | 1868 |
| | | 10 krajczár | 18 mm | | "FERENCZ JÓZSEF I.K.A.CS. ÉS M.H.S.D.O.AP.KIR."^{4}, I Ferenc József, mintmark | "VÁLTÓ PÉNZ", value, year of minting | 1868 |
| | | 20 krajczár | 21 mm | | "FERENCZ JÓZSEF A. CSÁSZÁR MAGYARORSZÁG AP. KIRÁLYA", I Ferenc József, mintmark | "VÁLTÓ PÉNZ", value, year of minting | 1868 |
| | | 20 krajczár | 21 mm | | "FERENCZ JÓZSEF A. CSÁSZÁR MAGYARORSZÁG AP. KIRÁLYA", I Ferenc József, mintmark | "MAGYAR KIRÁLYI VÁLTÓ PÉNZ", value, year of minting | 1868 |
| | | 20 krajczár | 21 mm | | "FERENCZ JÓZSEF I.K.A.CS. ÉS M.H.S.D.O.AP.KIR.", I Ferenc József, mintmark | "VÁLTÓ PÉNZ", value, year of minting | 1868 |
| | | 1 forint | 29 mm | "BIZALMAM AZ ŐSI ERÉNYBEN"^{5} | "FERENCZ JÓZSEF A. CSÁSZÁR"^{6}, I Ferenc József, mintmark | "MAGYAR ORSZÁG AP. KIRÁLYA"^{7}, Small coat of arms with angels, value, year of minting | 1868 |
| | | 1 forint | 29 mm | "BIZALMAM AZ ŐSI ERÉNYBEN"^{5} | "FERENCZ JÓZSEF I.K.A.CS. ÉS M.H.S.D.O.AP.KIR.", I Ferenc József, mintmark | "MAGYAR KIRÁLYSÁG"^{8}, Middle coat of arms, value, year of minting | 1870 |
| | | 1 forint | 29 mm | "BIZALMAM AZ ŐSI ERÉNYBEN"^{5} | "FERENCZ JÓZSEF I.K.A.CS. ÉS M.H.S.D.O.AP.KIR.", I Ferenc József, mintmark | "MAGYAR KIRÁLYSÁG", Middle coat of arms (baroque style), value, year of minting | 1882 |
| | | 1 forint | 29 mm | "BIZALMAM AZ ŐSI ERÉNYBEN"^{5} | "FERENCZ JÓZSEF I.K.A.CS. ÉS M.H.S.D.O.AP.KIR.", I Ferenc József, mintmark | "MAGYAR KIRÁLYSÁG", Middle coat of arms (including Fiume), value, year of minting | 1890 |
| | | 4 forint / 10 frank | 19 mm | | "FERENCZ JÓZSEF I.K.A.CS. ÉS M.H.S.D.O.AP.KIR.", I Ferenc József, mintmark | "MAGYAR KIRÁLYSÁG", Middle coat of arms, value, year of minting | 1870 |
| | | 4 forint / 10 frank | 19 mm | | "FERENCZ JÓZSEF I.K.A.CS. ÉS M.H.S.D.O.AP.KIR.", I Ferenc József, mintmark | "MAGYAR KIRÁLYSÁG", Middle coat of arms (including Fiume), value, year of minting | 1890 |
| | | 8 forint / 20 frank | 21 mm | | "FERENCZ JÓZSEF I.K.A.CS. ÉS M.H.S.D.O.AP.KIR.", I Ferenc József, mintmark | "MAGYAR KIRÁLYSÁG", Middle coat of arms, value, year of minting | 1870 |
| | | 8 forint / 20 frank | 21 mm | | "FERENCZ JÓZSEF I.K.A.CS. ÉS M.H.S.D.O.AP.KIR.", I Ferenc József, mintmark | "MAGYAR KIRÁLYSÁG", Middle coat of arms (including Fiume), value, year of minting | 1890 |
Coins of Hungary – bullion gold coins
| | | 1 dukát | 19.75 mm | | "FERENCZ J. A. CSÁSZÁR"^{9}, standing I Ferenc József, mintmark | "MAGYAR ORSZÁG AP. KIRÁLYA", Small coat of arms with angels, year of minting | 1868 |
| | | 1 dukát | 19.75 mm | | "FERENCZ JÓZSEF I.K.A.CS. ÉS M.H.S.D.O.AP.KIR.", standing I Ferenc József, mintmark | "MAGYAR KIRÁLYSÁG", Middle coat of arms, year of minting | 1870 |
| | | 1 dukát | 19.75 mm | | "FERENCZ JÓZSEF I.K.A.CS. ÉS M.H.S.D.O.AP.KIR.", I Ferenc József, mintmark | "MAGYAR KIRÁLYSÁG", Middle coat of arms, year of minting | 1877 |
These images are to scale at 2.5 pixels per millimetre. For table standards, see the coin specification table.

== Notes ==
1. "MAGYAR KIRÁLYI VÁLTÓ PÉNZ" = "Hungarian Royal token coin"
2. "FERENCZ JÓZSEF A. CSÁSZÁR MAGYARORSZÁG AP. KIRÁLYA" = "Ferencz József ausztriai császár Magyarország apostoli királya" = "Franz Joseph Austrian Emperor Apostolic King of Hungary
3. "VÁLTÓ PÉNZ" = "token coin"
4. "FERENCZ JÓZSEF I.K.A.CS. ÉS M.H.S.D.O.AP.KIR." = "Ferencz József Isten kegyelméből ausztriai császár és Magyar-, Horvát-, Szlavon-, Dalmátországok apostoli királya" = "Franz Joseph by the Grace of God Emperor of Austria and Apostolic King of Hungary, Croatia, Slavonia, Dalmatia"
5. "BIZALMAM AZ ŐSI ERÉNYBEN" = "My trust in the ancient virtue"
6. "FERENCZ JÓZSEF A. CSÁSZÁR" = "Ferencz József ausztriai császár" = "Franz Joseph Austrian Emperor"
7. "MAGYAR ORSZÁG AP. KIRÁLYA" = "Magyar ország apostoli királya" = "Apostolic King of Hungary"
8. "MAGYAR KIRÁLYSÁG" = "Hungarian Kingdom"
9. "FERENCZ J. A. CSÁSZÁR" = "Ferencz József ausztriai császár" = "Franz Joseph Austrian Emperor"
