= Mojtín =

- Municipality
- Flag

- Location of Mojtín in the Trenčín Region Location of Mojtín in Slovakia
- Coordinates: 48.98°N 18.42°E
- Country: Slovakia
- Region: Trenčín Region
- District: Púchov District
- First mentioned: 1364

Area
  - Total: 10.84 km^{2} (4.19 sq mi)
- Elevation: 619 m (2,031 ft)

Population (2025)
  - Total: 429
- Time zone: UTC+1 (CET)
  - Summer (DST): UTC+2 (CEST)
- Postal code: 207 2
- Area code: +421 42
- Vehicle registration plate (until 2022): PU
- Website: www.obecmojtin.sk

Mojtín (Hungarian: Hegyesmajtény) is a village and municipality in Púchov District in the Trenčín Region of north-western Slovakia. László Skultéty-Gábriš, the oldest Hungarian hussar, was born here.

== Etymology ==
The name is derived from the Slovak personal name Mojtech with the possessive suffix -in.

== History ==
In historical records the village was first mentioned in 1208 as Motie, in 1265 as Moythe, in 1364 as Moite, in 1397 as Mahtyn, in 1465 as Mayten, in 1472 as Moythin, in 1496 as Moythyn, after until 1899 as Mojtény, then Hegyesmajtény. As part of Czechoslovakia, Slovakia, Mojtín has been its official name. Since the 16th century the village became part of Pruzsina (a larger territory surrounding today's Pružina) until 1863.

== Geography ==
The municipality lies at an altitude of 619 metres (2,031 ft) and covers an area of 10.84 km^{2} (4.19 sq mi) (2025).

== Population ==
Population statistic (10 years)
Year	1995	2005	2015	2025
Count	617	573	443	429
Difference		−7.13%	−22.68%	−3.16%

Population statistic
Year	2024	2025
Count	426	429
Difference		+0.70%

It has a population of 429 people (31 December 2025).

=== Ethnicity ===
Census 2021 (1+ %)
Ethnicity	Number	Fraction
Slovak	425	98.37%
Total	432	

In year 2021 was 432 people by ethnicity 425 as Slovak, 4 as Czech, 2 as Not found out, 1 as Vietnamese and 1 as Silesian.

Note on population: The difference values of population numbers in the table "Population statistic" and in the sections "Ethnicity" & "Religion" is caused by the use of various statistical methods.

=== Religion ===
Census 2021 (1+ %)
Religion	Number	Fraction
Roman Catholic Church	386	89.35%
None	34	7.87%
Total	432	

In year 2021 was 432 people by religion 386 from Roman Catholic Church, 34 from None, 3 from Not found out, 3 from Christian Congregations in Slovakia, 2 from Ad hoc movements, 1 from United Methodist Church, 1 from Evangelical Church, 1 from Buddhism and 1 from Apostolic Church.
