= Lőrinc Orczy =

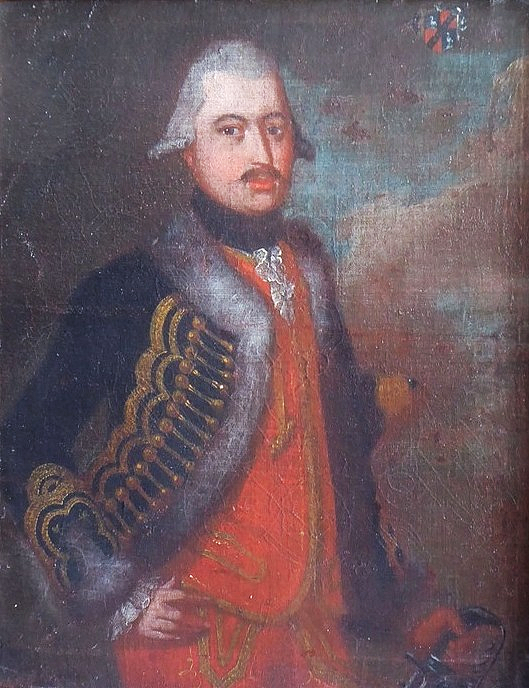
Lőrinc Orczy

Lőrinc Orczy (Hungarian: Orczy Lőrinc; 9 August 1718 – 28 July 1789) was a Hungarian nobleman, general and poet. politician.
