= Liberal Party (Hungary) =

Former Hungarian political party (1875–1906)

Liberal Party Szabadelvű Párt
- Historical leaders: István Gorove, Kálmán Tisza, Gusztáv Vizsolyi
- Founded: 1 March 1875
- Dissolved: 11 April 1906
- Merger of: Deák Party; Left Centre
- Succeeded by: National Party of Work (since 1910)
- Headquarters: Budapest, Hungary
- Ideology: National liberalism Economic liberalism Magyarization
- Colours: Blue

The Liberal Party (Hungarian: Szabadelvű Párt) was a political party in Hungary between 1875 and 1906.

== History ==
The party was established in February 1875 by a merger of the Deák Party and the Left Centre, and won a landslide victory in the July–August 1875 parliamentary elections, winning 333 of the 414 seats in the Diet. Former Left Centre member Kálmán Tisza became prime minister, a post he held until 1890. The Liberal Party was a main supporter of the Austro-Hungarian Compromise of 1867 and the partnership with Austria. However the Austro-Hungarian Compromise remained bitterly unpopular among the ethnic Hungarian voters, and the continuous successes of the pro-compromise Liberal Party in parliamentary elections caused long-lasting frustration for Hungarians. The ethnic minorities had the key role in the maintenance of the compromise in Hungary because they were able to vote the pro-compromise Liberal Party to election victories. The pro-compromise liberal parties were the most popular among ethnic minority voters, with Slovak, Serb and Romanian minority parties remaining unpopular among their own ethnic minority voters. The Liberal Party was often called the "Imperialist Party" due to its support for the Austro-Hungarian Compromise, and had a negative connotation as a supporter of the political and economic interests of Austrian Empire, and the Habsburg Emperor, hence the ethnic Hungarian voters mocked the party as "the Imperialists". In the 1905 elections, the coalitions of Hungarian nationalist parties like the Independence and '48 Party won the most seats. The nationalist coalition was supported by the overwhelming majority of ethnic Hungarian voters. In 1906 King Franz Joseph announced a new election, which was won by the nationalist coalition again. Due to these defeat at the parliamentary election, the Liberal Party has disbanded itself, and it was reorganized under a new name: National Party of Work in 1910.

== Support ==
The voting districts that predominantly supported the government and the Liberal Party were chiefly situated in regions inhabited by ethnic minorities, whereas opposition strongholds were found in areas with a Hungarian majority. To secure the ruling party's success, the districts in minority regions were delineated to be smaller than those in Hungarian-majority regions. This strategy enabled the election of a greater number of representatives from minority-dominated districts to parliament, which further shrunk the value of votes in ethnic Hungarian territories. Consequently, the Liberal Party was able to sustain its parliamentary majority for an extended period with considerable success.

The party passed legislation for Jewish emancipation and appointed Jews to parliament (both the upper and lower houses) in 1867. In return, many Jews supported the party. Many districts of Budapest, where Jews made up half of the voters, reliably voted for the Liberal candidate.

== Election results ==
=== National Assembly ===
Election	Leader	Votes	%	Seats	Rank	Status
1875	Kálmán Tisza			333 / 414	1st	Government
1878	István Gorove			235 / 413	1st	Government
1881	Gusztáv Vizsolyi			333 / 414	1st	Government
1884	Gusztáv Vizsolyi			234 / 413	1st	Government
1887	Gusztáv Vizsolyi			263 / 413	1st	Government
1892	Frigyes Podmaniczky			243 / 413	1st	Government
1896	Frigyes Podmaniczky			290 / 413	1st	Government
1901	Frigyes Podmaniczky			277 / 413	1st	Government
1905	Frigyes Podmaniczky			159 / 413	2nd	Opposition
