= Pružina =

- Municipality
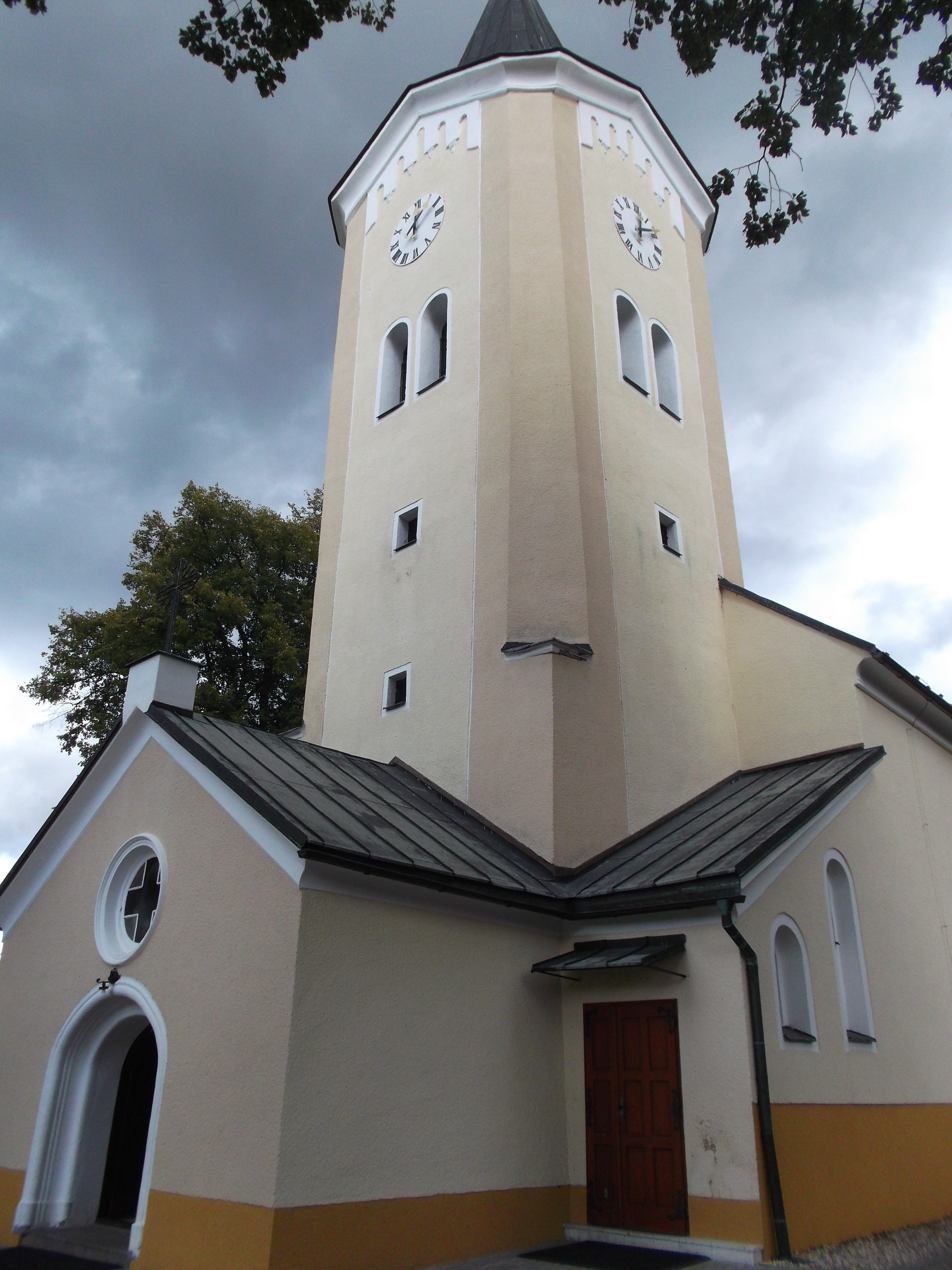

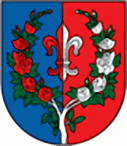
- Flag Coat of arms

- Location of Pružina in the Trenčín Region Location of Pružina in Slovakia
- Coordinates: 49.02°N 18.48°E
- Country: Slovakia
- Region: Trenčín Region
- District: Považská Bystrica District
- First mentioned: 1271

Area
  - Total: 40.43 km^{2} (15.61 sq mi)
- Elevation: 420 m (1,380 ft)

Population (2025)
  - Total: 2,109
- Time zone: UTC+1 (CET)
  - Summer (DST): UTC+2 (CEST)
- Postal code: 182 2
- Area code: +421 42
- Vehicle registration plate (until 2022): PB
- Website: pruzina.eu

Pružina (Hungarian: Barossháza) is a village and municipality in Považská Bystrica District in the Trenčín Region of north-western Slovakia.

Pružina is also a surname that comes from the village of Pružina and is very uncommon.

== History ==
Several important sites and artifacts have been discovered in the area of the village and close neighborhood, including a depot of bronze jewelry dated to early La Tène-period and gold and silver Celtic coins (Michalová Hill). In Pružina-Mesciská, a hillfort existed in the Early Middle Ages and several Slavic burial mounds have been discovered in the wider area. A large iron depot discovered in Mesciská dated to the Great Moravian period is the largest collection of this type in Slovakia.

In historical records the village was first mentioned in 1272 as Prusina, then in 1330 as Prusinn, in 1364 as Pruzina, later Pruzsina until 1899, then it was renamed to Barossháza after Gábor Baross. Since the 16th century until 1863 today's Mojtín was part of the village. As part of Czechoslovakia, Slovakia, Pružina has been its official name.

== Geography ==
The municipality lies at an altitude of 420 metres (1,380 ft) and covers an area of 40.43 km^{2} (15.61 sq mi) (2025).

== Population ==
Population statistic (10 years)
Year	1995	2005	2015	2025
Count	1929	1913	2032	2109
Difference		−0.82%	+6.22%	+3.78%

Population statistic
Year	2024	2025
Count	2113	2109
Difference		−0.18%

It has a population of 2109 people (31 December 2025).

=== Ethnicity ===
Census 2021 (1+ %)
Ethnicity	Number	Fraction
Slovak	1991	97.74%
Not found out	35	1.71%
Total	2037	

In year 2021 was 2037 people by ethnicity 1991 as Slovak, 35 as Not found out, 19 as Czech, 13 as Other, 6 as Polish, 5 as German, 3 as French, 2 as Italian, 2 as Russian, 2 as Hungarian, 2 as English, 1 as Jewish, 1 as Ukrainian, 1 as Austrian, 1 as Greek, 1 as Croatian and 1 as Albanian.

Note on population: The difference values of population numbers in the table "Population statistic" and in the sections "Ethnicity" & "Religion" is caused by the use of various statistical methods.

=== Religion ===
Census 2021 (1+ %)
Religion	Number	Fraction
Roman Catholic Church	1761	86.45%
None	184	9.03%
Not found out	33	1.62%
Total	2037	

In year 2021 was 2037 people by religion 1761 from Roman Catholic Church, 184 from None, 33 from Not found out, 14 from Other, 13 from Evangelical Church, 11 from Greek Catholic Church, 5 from Christian Congregations in Slovakia, 4 from Paganism and natural spirituality, 3 from Other and not ascertained christian church, 3 from Islam, 2 from Buddhism, 2 from Ad hoc movements, 1 from Jehovah's Witnesses and 1 from Hinduism.

== People ==
- Gábor Baross, (1848 in Barossháza – 1892) statesman.
- Štefan Závodník, local priest; the local chapel was built on his order
