= Béla Bánhidy =

Hungarian politician

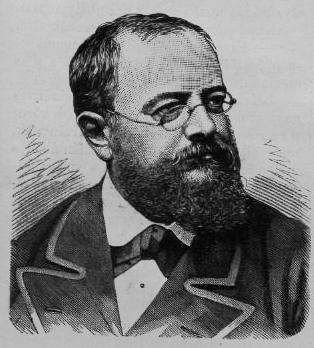
- Born: 17 February 1836; Makó, Kingdom of Hungary
- Died: 18 June 1890 (aged 54); Arad, Austria-Hungary
- Occupation: politician
- Spouse: Irma Návay de Földeák
- Children: István

Baron Béla Bánhidy de Simánd (17 February 1836 – 18 June 1890) was a Hungarian politician and Member of Parliament.

He was elected as a member of the Diet of Hungary in 1875 as an MP for Kisjenő (today: Chişineu-Criş, Romania). After the Occupation of Bosnia and Herzegovina (1878) he withdrew from the Liberal Party and formed the Independent Liberal Party, which soon merged into the Right-wing Opposition. He became first chairman of the newly formed Moderate Opposition, which later was renamed to National Party in 1891.

Bánhidy lost his mandate in the 1878 elections. He conducted journalistic activities for newspapers in Budapest. Later he moved to Arad (today in Romania).
