= Gábor Kemény (politician, 1830–1888) =

Hungarian politician

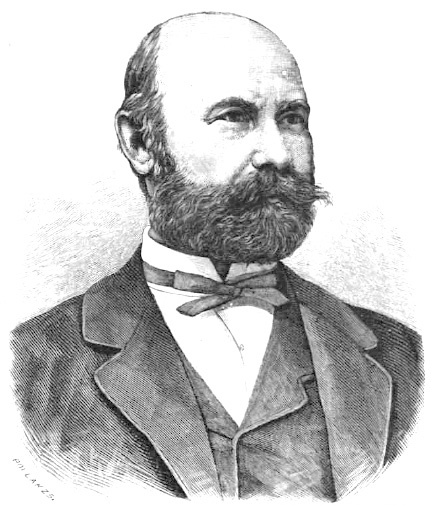

Minister of Agriculture, Industry and Trade of Hungary
- In office 4 December 1878 – 12 October 1882
- Preceded by: Ágoston Trefort
- Succeeded by: Pál Széchenyi

Personal details
- Born: 9 July 1830 Csombord, Kingdom of Hungary
- Died: 23 October 1888 (aged 58) Ajnácskő, Austria-Hungary
- Party: Deák Party, Liberal Party
- Profession: politician

Baron Gábor Kemény de Magyargyerőmonostor (9 July 1830 – 23 October 1888) was a Hungarian politician, who served as Minister of Agriculture, Industry and Trade between 1878–1882 and as Minister of Public Works and Transport from 1882 to 1886. He was the son of Dénes Kemény, the secretary of state of the Interior Ministry during the Hungarian Revolution of 1848. Gábor Kemény was a corresponding member of the Hungarian Academy of Sciences since 1863 and served as chairman of the Hungarian Historical Society from 1887 until his death. He was a member of the Diet of Hungary from 1866.

Political offices
Preceded by Ágoston Trefort	Minister of Agriculture, Industry and Trade; 1878–1882	Succeeded by Pál Széchenyi
Preceded by Pál Ordódy	Minister of Public Works and Transport; 1882–1886	Succeeded by Béla Orczy
