= István Gorove =

Hungarian politician (1819–1881)

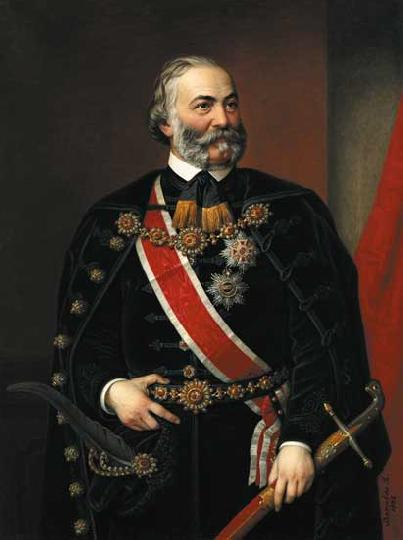

Minister of Agriculture, Industry and Trade of Hungary
- In office 20 February 1867 – 23 May 1870
- Preceded by: Kázmér Batthyány
- Succeeded by: József Szlávy

Personal details
- Born: 20 August 1819 Pest, Kingdom of Hungary
- Died: 31 May 1881 (aged 61) Budapest, Austria-Hungary
- Party: Opposition Party (1847–1848); Deák Party (1865–1875); Liberal Party (1875–1881)
- Profession: politician

István Gorove de Gáttája (20 August 1819 in Pest – 31 May 1881 in Budapest) was a Hungarian politician. He was leader of the Liberal Party, which controlled Hungary between 1875 and 1905. Gorove was a minister in Count Gyula Andrássy's cabinet: Minister of Agriculture, Industry and Trade between 1867 and 1870, and Minister of Public Works and Transport until 1871.

Political offices
Preceded by Kázmér Batthyány	Minister of Agriculture, Industry and Trade; 1867–1870	Succeeded by József Szlávy
Preceded by Imre Mikó	Minister of Public Works and Transport; 1870–1871	Succeeded by Lajos Tisza
Party political offices
Preceded by Kálmán Tisza	Chairman of the Liberal Party; 1875–1881	Succeeded by Gusztáv Vizsolyi
