= Gusztáv Vizsolyi =

Hungarian politician (1822–1889)

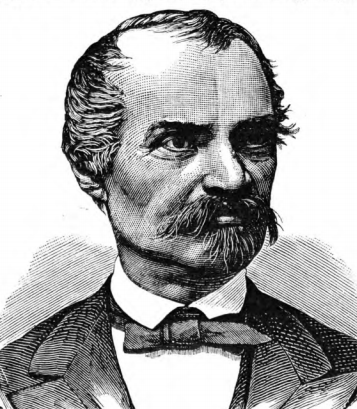

Chairman of the Liberal Party
- In office June 1881 – 9 February 1889
- Preceded by: István Gorove
- Succeeded by: Frigyes Podmaniczky

Personal details
- Born: 1822 Dunaszentgyörgy, Kingdom of Hungary
- Died: 9 February 1889 (aged 67) Budapest, Austria-Hungary
- Party: Deák Party (1872-1875); Liberal Party (1875-1889)
- Profession: politician

Gusztáv Vizsolyi (1822 – 9 February 1889) was a Hungarian jurist and politician from Tolna County. He was leader of the Liberal Party, which controlled Hungary between 1875 and 1905.

== Political career ==
He was born in Dunaszentgyörgy. He studied law in Pozsony (today: Bratislava, Slovakia) and became a lawyer in Pest. After that he served as an official in Tolna County. He was appointed deputy notary. Since 1861, he served as Chief Notary of the county and later was elected Deputy Lieutenant (Viscount; vicecomes) in 1865.

He became Member of Parliament for Kölesd in 1872. He was a member of the Deák Party which united with the Centre Left. Thus Vizsolyi became a member of the Liberal Party after 1875, which was the governing party of the Hungarian part of the Austro-Hungarian Empire until 1905. He was a member of the Parliamentary Committee of Administration since 1874. After the death of István Gorove, Vizsolyi was appointed leader of the Liberal Party. He held the position until his death. Vizsolyi died of cancer in 1889. He was buried on 13 February 1889.

Party political offices
Preceded by István Gorove	Chairman of the Liberal Party; 1881–1889	Succeeded by Frigyes Podmaniczky
