= Austro-Hungarian gulden =

Currency of the lands of the House of Habsburg

Gulden (German); forint (Hungarian); zlatý (Czech)
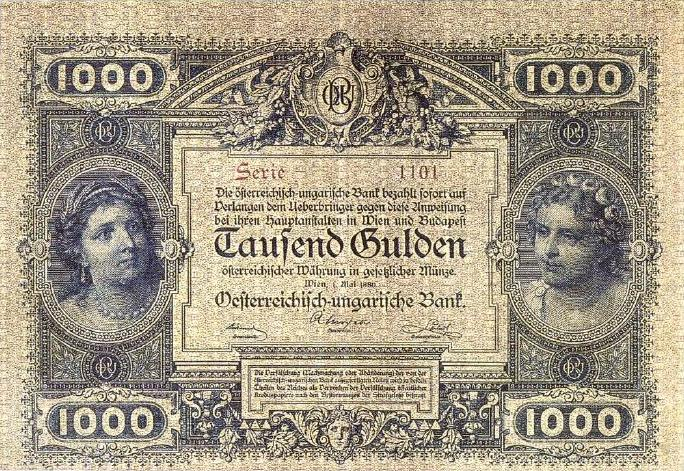
1,000 gulden banknote (1880)
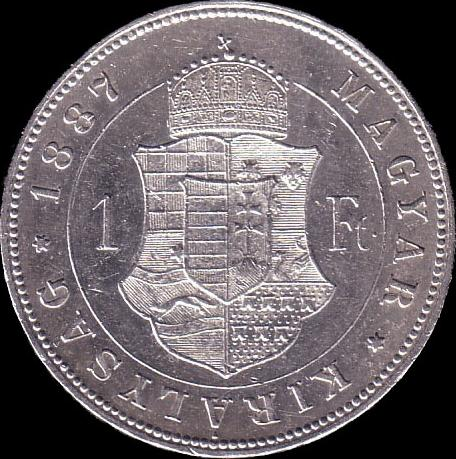
1 gulden coin (1887)

Unit
- Symbol: Fl. (in Latin), Ft. (in Hungarian), злр. (in Ukrainian)

Denominations
- Subunit
- 1/60 (to 1857) 1/100 (after): kreuzer
- Banknotes: 1, 5, 10, 50, 100, 1,000 gulden
- Coins: 5/10, 1, 4, 5, 10, 20 kreuzer; 1/4, 1, 2, 4, 8 gulden; 1, 2 Vereinsthaler (1 1/2 Fl., 3 Fl.)

Demographics
- Date of withdrawal: 1892
- Replaced by: Austro-Hungarian krone
- User(s): Austria-Hungary, Principality of Montenegro

Issuance
- Central bank: Austro-Hungarian Bank
- This infobox shows the latest status before this currency was rendered obsolete.

The Austro-Hungarian gulden (German), also known as the florin (German & Croatian), forint (Hungarian; Croatian: forinta), or zloty (Polish: złoty reński; Czech: zlatý; Ukrainian: золотий ринський), was the currency of the lands of the House of Habsburg between 1754 and 1892 (known as the Austrian Empire from 1804 to 1867 and the Austro-Hungarian Monarchy after 1867), when it was replaced by the Austro-Hungarian krone as part of the introduction of the gold standard. In Austria, the gulden was initially divided into 60 kreuzers (German; Hungarian: krajczár; Croatian: krajcar; Czech: krejcar; Polish: krajcar; Ukrainian: ґрайцар). The currency was decimalized in 1857, using the same names for the unit and subunit.

== Name ==
The name Gulden was used on pre-1867 Austrian banknotes and on the German language side of the post-1867 banknotes. In southern Germany, the word Gulden was the standard word for a major currency unit. After 1867 Austrian coins used the name Florin. "Florin" is derived from the city of Florence, Italy where the first florins were minted, from 1252 to 1533.

== History ==
The gulden first emerged as a common currency of the Holy Roman Empire after the 1524 Reichsmünzordnung in the form of the Guldengroschen. In the succeeding centuries the gulden was then defined as a fraction of the Reichsthaler specie or silver coin.

As of 1690 the gulden used in Southern Germany and the Habsburg monarchy adhered to the Leipzig standard, with the gulden worth 1/18 of a Cologne Mark of fine silver or 1/2 of a Reichsthaler specie coin, or 12.992 g per gulden. Below is a history (in terms of grams of silver) of the standards of the Austro-Hungarian gulden from 1690 until the gold standard was introduced in 1892. A comparison with the lower-valued South German gulden is also included. The course of value of the gulden before 1618 is found under Reichsthaler.

Values of Austrian & South German gulden in metal and coins
Standard	South German gulden	metal	Austrian gulden	metal	Subunit (Austria)	Selected other coins (Austria)
1690: Reichsthaler = 2 Fl.	12.992 g	silver	12.992 g	silver		
1741: gold Carolin = 9 Fl.	0.68 g	gold	0.83 g	gold		
1753: Conventionsthaler = 2 Fl.	9.744 g	silver	11.693 g	silver	60 kreuzer	Pfenig (4 pfenige = 1 kreuzer); Groschen (= 3 kreuzer); Ducat (gold, =4.5 gulden in 1856)
1857: Vereinsthaler = 1.5 Fl.	9.524 g	silver	11.111 g	silver	100 (neu-)kreuzer	Krone (gold, = 13.8 gulden in 1858)
1892: Austria introduces krone (1 gulden = 2 kronen, gold–silver ratio 18.2)			100/328 g	gold	100 heller (German)/ fillér (Hungarian)	

The gulden departed from the Leipzig standard in the 1730s when the gold to silver price ratio dropped from 15 to 14.5, prompting several states to reissue their gulden in cheaper gold. The Austro-Hungarian gulden then departed from its South German counterpart after it valued the Carolin d'or of 7.51 g fine gold at 9 Austrian gulden, versus 11 gulden in Southern Germany. This made the Austrian gulden worth 7.51 ÷ 9 = 0.834 g fine gold, or 0.834 × 14.5 = 12.1 g fine silver.

As Austria was the leading state of the Holy Roman Empire, it initiated the currency convention of 1754 in which the Conventionsthaler replaced the reichsthaler specie as the standard currency of the Holy Roman Empire. The Gulden was defined as half of a Conventionsthaler, equivalent to 1/20 of a Cologne mark of silver, or 11.6928 g. The South German gulden was set lower at 24 guldens per Cologne mark of silver, or 2.4 guldens per Conventionsthaler, or 9.744 g. The North German Reichsthaler currency unit was then defined as 1 1/2 Gulden or 3/4 Conventionsthaler, or 17.5392 g. Following the winding up of the Holy Roman Empire in 1806, the Gulden became the standard unit of account in the Habsburg lands and remained so until 1892. The gulden was subdivided in 60 kreuzer, each of 4 pfennig or 8 heller.

In 1857, the Vereinsthaler was introduced across the German Confederation and Austria-Hungary, with a silver content of 16 2/3 grams. This was slightly less than 1 1/2 times the silver content of the Gulden. Consequently, Austria-Hungary adopted a new standard for the gulden, containing two-thirds as much silver as the Vereinsthaler, or 11 1/9 g. This involved a debasement of the currency of 4.97%. Austria-Hungary also decimalized at the same time, resulting in a new currency system of 100 kreuzer = 1 gulden and 1 1/2 gulden = 1 Vereinsthaler.

In 1892 the Austro-Hungarian gulden was replaced by the krone, with each krone containing 100/328 grams of gold, at a rate of 1 gulden = 2 kronen (gold–silver ratio 18.2).

In 1946 the Hungarian forint (magyar forint) was reintroduced and remains the official currency in Hungary.

== Coins ==
=== Austria ===
Copper coins were initially issued in denominations of 1 heller (1/8 kreuzer) up to 1 kreuzer, with silver coins in denominations from 3 kreuzers up to 1 Conventionsthaler. The Turkish and Napoleonic Wars led to token issues in various denominations. These included a 12 kreuzer coin which only contained 6 kreuzers worth of silver and was later overstruck to produce a 7 kreutzer coin. In 1807, copper coins were issued in denominations of 15 and 30 kreuzers by the Wiener Stadt Banco. These issues were tied in value to the bank's paper money (see below). The coinage returned to its prewar state after 1814.

When the gulden was decimalized in 1857, new coins were issued in denominations of 1/2 (actually written 5/10), 1 and 4 kreuzers in copper, with silver coins of 5, 10, and 20 kreuzers, 1/4, 1 and 2 gulden and 1 and 2 Vereinsthaler and gold coins of 4 and 8 gulden (or 10- and 20 francs). Vereinsthaler issues ceased in 1867.

=== Hungary ===
Following the forint's introduction, Hungary issued relatively few coins compared to Austria, but the Kingdom of Hungary started minting its own gold forints in 1329. The only copper coin was a poltura worth 1 1/2 krajczár, whilst there were silver 3-, 5-, 10-, 20-, and 30-krajczár and 1/2 and 1 Conventionsthaler coins. All issues ceased in 1794 and did not resume until 1830, when silver coins of 20 krajczár and above were issued. Only in 1868, following the Austro-Hungarian Compromise of 1867, did a full issue of coins for Hungary begin. Denominations were fewer than in Austria, with copper 1/2, 1 and 4 krajczár, silver 10 and 20 krajczár and 1 forint, and gold 4- and 8 forints.

== Paper money ==
Examples of Austrian 10 gulden notes
1841
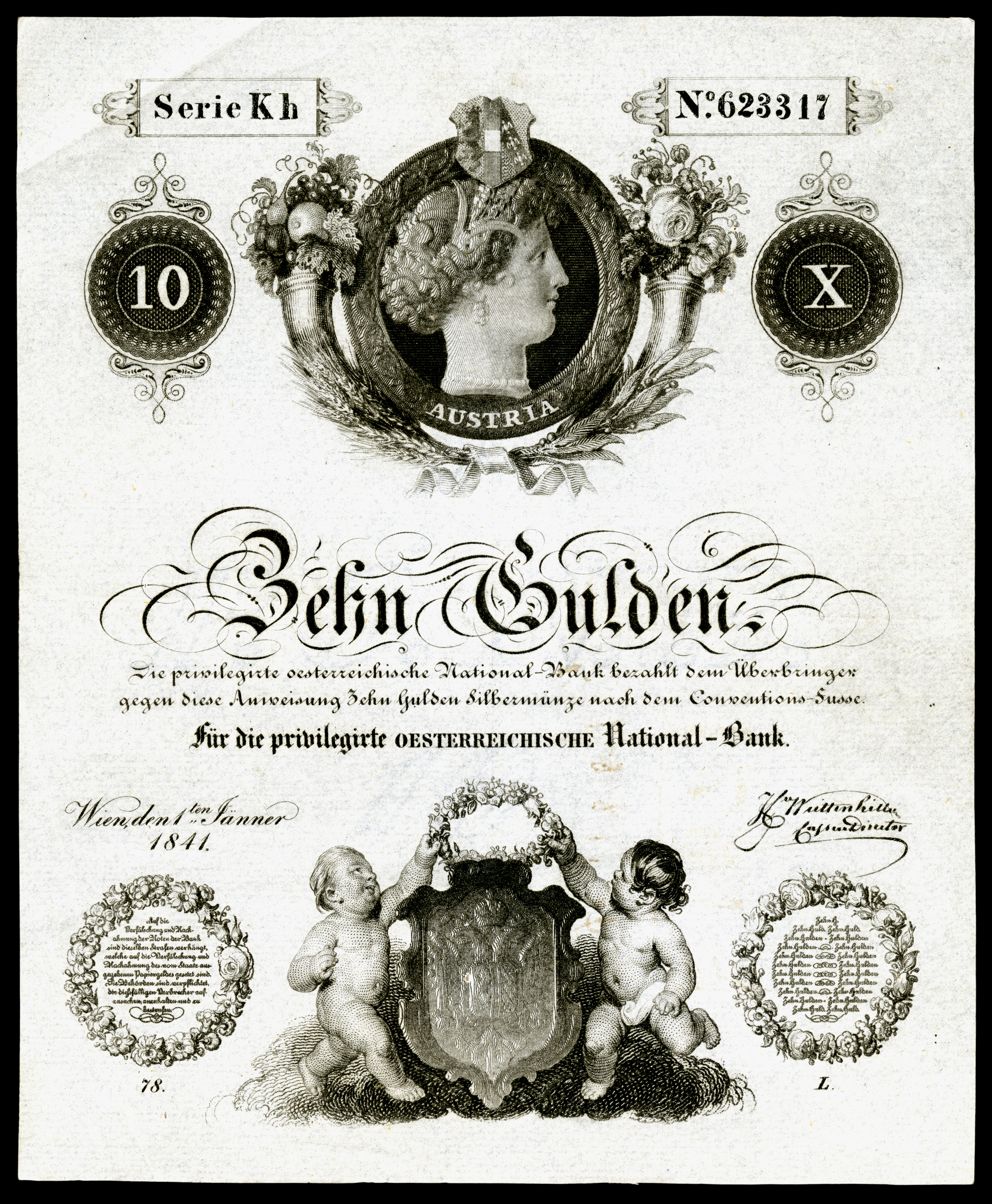
1854
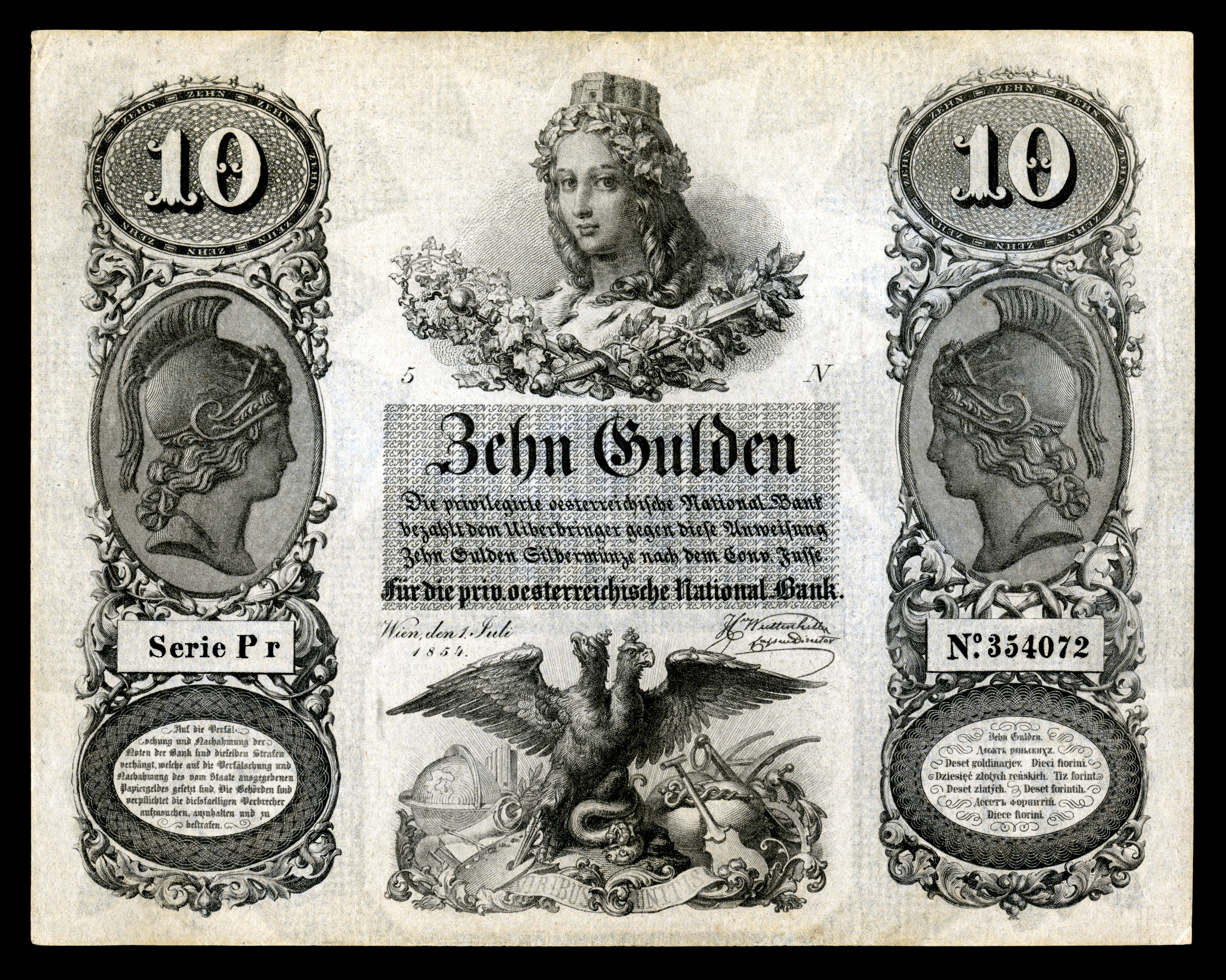
1863
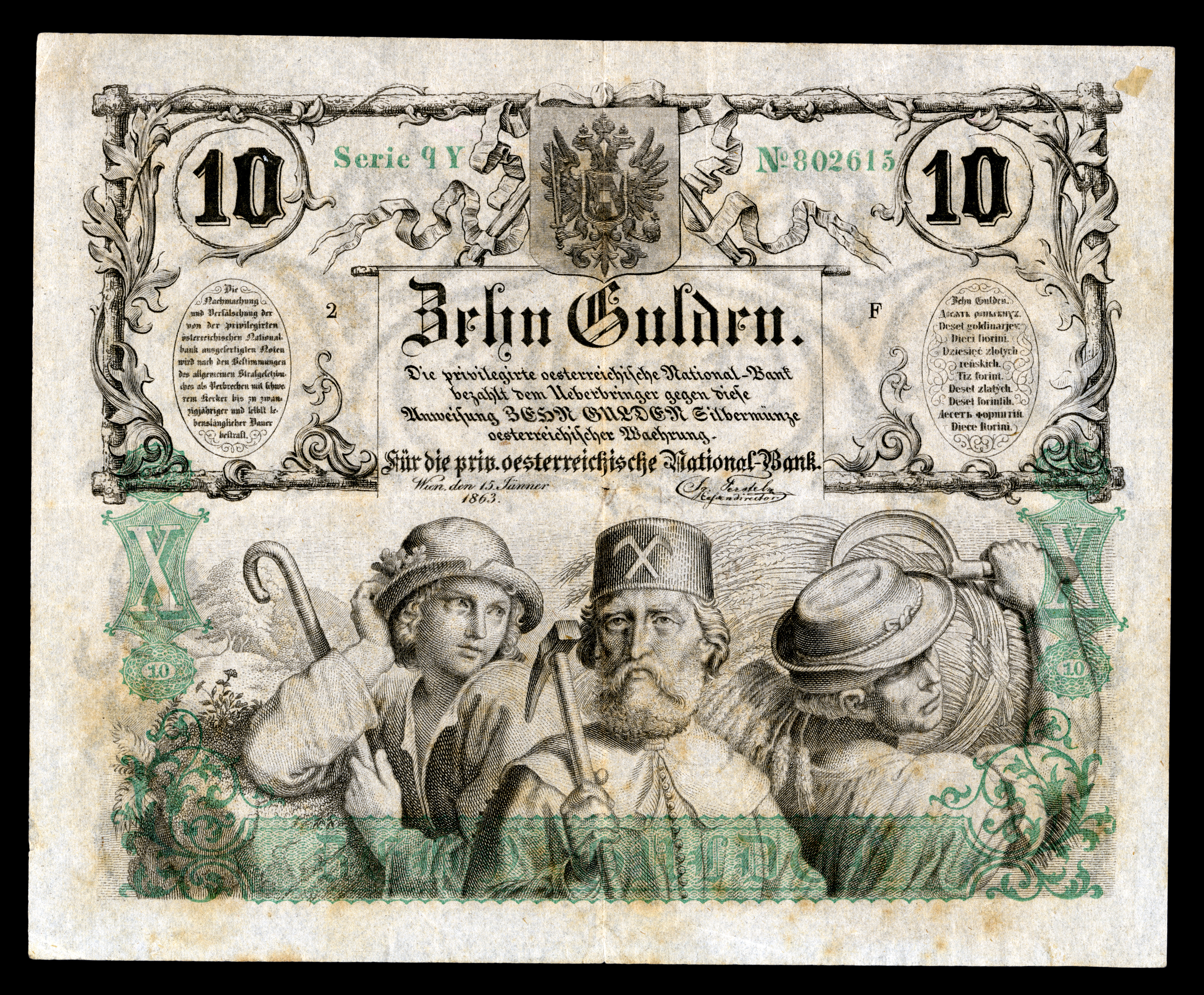

Between 1759 and 1811, the Wiener Stadt Banco issued paper money denominated in gulden. However, the banknotes were not tied to the coinage and their values floated relative to one another. Although the notes did have a slight premium over coins early on, in later years, the notes fell in value relative to the coins until their value was fixed in 1811 at one fifth of their face value in coins. That year, the Priviligirte Vereinigte Einlösungs und Tilgungs Deputation ("Privileged United Redemption and Repayment Deputation") began issuing paper money valued at par with the coinage, followed by the "Austrian National Note Bank" in 1816 and the "Privileged Austrian National Bank" between 1825 and 1863. In 1858, new notes were issued denominated in "Austrian Currency" rather than "Convention Currency".

From 1866, the K. K. Staats Central Casse ("Imperial and Royal State Central Cashier") issued banknotes, followed from 1881 by the K. K. Reichs Central Casse which issued the last Gulden banknotes, dated 1888.

The banknotes after Austro-Hungarian Compromise of 1867 that were issued by the Austro-Hungarian Bank had their value that was guaranteed with gold as enacted in the Banking Act. State notes were issued by the treasury and had no such cover.

Banknotes after the Ausgleich
Image		Value	Dimensions	Description		Date of		
Obverse	Reverse	Value	Dimensions	Obverse	Reverse	printing	issue	withdrawal
		10 Fl.	132 × 89 mm	Female models		1 May 1880	3 January 1881	28 February 1903
		100 Fl.	153 × 107 mm	Allegoric figures		1 May 1880	31 October 1881	30 April 1904
		1,000 Fl.	180 × 126 mm	Young female models		1 May 1880	31 October 1881	30 April 1904
State notes after the Ausgleich
		1 Fl.	71 × 112 mm	Franz Joseph I of Austria		1 January 1882	6 October 1882	30 June 1890
		1 Fl.	68 × 105 mm	Franz Joseph I of Austria and child angel		1 July 1888	13 July 1889	30 June 1890
		5 Fl.	136 × 92 mm	Franz Joseph I of Austria and female models		1 January 1881	1 October 1881	28 February 1903
		50 Fl.	170 × 110 mm	Franz Joseph I of Austria and allegoric composition		1 January 1884	23 May 1884	28 February 1903
These images are to scale at 0.7 pixel per millimetre (18 pixel per inch). For table standards, see the banknote specification table.
