= Kálmán Tisza =

Hungarian politician (1830–1902)

Noble Kálmán Tisza de Borosjenő
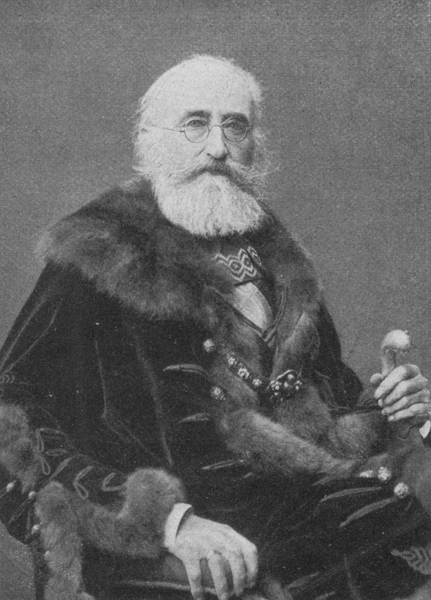

9th Prime Minister of the Kingdom of Hungary
- In office 20 October 1875 – 13 March 1890
- Monarch: Francis Joseph I
- Preceded by: Béla Wenckheim
- Succeeded by: Gyula Szapáry

Personal details
- Born: 16 December 1830 Nagyvárad, Kingdom of Hungary
- Died: 23 March 1902 (aged 71) Budapest, Austria-Hungary
- Party: Resolution Party (1861); Left Centre (1865–1875); Liberal Party (1875–1902)
- Spouse: Ilona Degenfeld-Schonburg
- Children: István; Paulina; Kálmán; Lajos
- Parent(s): Lajos Tisza de Borosjenő; Juliánna Teleki de Szék

Kálmán Tisza de Borosjenő (archaic English: Coloman Tisza, or Koloman Tisza; 16 December 1830 – 23 March 1902) was a Hungarian politician during the Austro-Hungarian empire who served as the Hungarian prime minister between 1875 and 1890. He is credited with the formation of a consolidated Hungarian government, the foundation of the new Liberal Party (1875) and major economic reforms that would both save and eventually lead to a government with popular support. He is the second longest-serving head of government in Hungarian history. He also reformed the Hungarian House of Magnates.

== Early life ==
Kálmán Tisza was born in 1830 to Count Lajos Tisza (1798-1856) and his wife Juliánna Teleki (1805-1863).

== Political career ==
At the age of 18, Kálmán Tisza witnessed one of the greatest transformations of the political arena in Hungarian history. Hungary's political system changed from being a feudalistic state into a newly established constitutional monarchy that shared many components with modern-day governments, and he obtained a post in the ministry of instruction of the revolutionary government. Legislation such as Public Law III abolished the Royal Chancellery and the Residential Council replacing them with a bicameral parliament (House of Lords and House of Representatives). Democratic principles were established with Public Law V that allowed 6.5% of the population to vote (Janos 85). Also, the union of traditional Hungarian lands under Public Law VI and VII created a unified Hungary. These powerful reforms led to a liberal revolution that culminated in the dethroning of the Habsburg dynasty during the Hungarian Revolution of 1848-49.

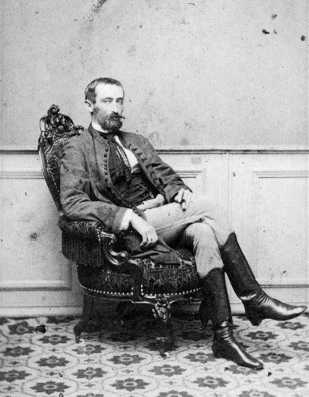
Kálmán Tisza 1865

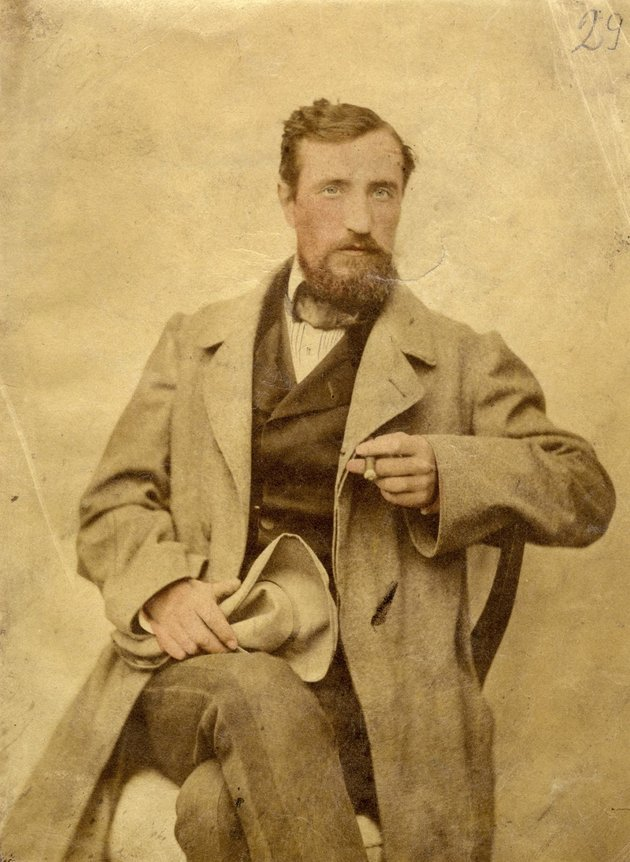
Kálmán Tisza, 1870

With the defeat of the Hungarians during the revolution, many of the reforms were revoked and Hungary was put under military dictatorship under Austrian general Julius Haynau. Tisza went abroad with most of his family, and carefully studied foreign institutions. On returning home he devoted himself to the improvement of the family estates, and in 1855 was elected assistant curator of the Calvinist church at Salonta, in succession to his father.

Though the revolution's suppression ended the parliamentary-style government in Hungary, it did not destroy the seeds that were sown by the initial reforms. During 1859 and 1860—after seeing the Hungarian popular support for the Italians during the Austro-Italian wars—Austria began to try new constitutional experiments in Hungary. During this period, Kálmán Tisza was first elected to the newly formed government. When, on 1 September 1859, the Austrian government issued the "Patent" which struck at the very roots of Protestant autonomy in Hungary, Tisza, at the congress of the Calvinist Church beyond the Theiss, held at Debrecen, publicly repudiated the Patent on behalf of the Calvinist laity. He renewed his opposition in the most uncompromising terms at the ensuing congress (Jan. 11, 1860), shrewdly guessing that the Patent was directed as much against the Hungarian constitution as against the Calvinist confession.

In August 1860 Tisza married the countess Helen Degenfeld-Schomburg, a union which brought him into close connexion with the Károlyis, the Podmaniczkys and the Odescalchis. He was unanimously elected to represent Debreczen at the 1861 Diet, and was elected vice-president of the house at its second session. The Diet was divided between the "Addressers", led by Ferenc Deák, and the "Resolutionists," led by Count László Teleki, and on the death of the latter Tisza succeeded him as the leader of the more radical party. During the Provisorium (1861–1865) Tisza fought for constitutional reform in the columns of the Hon and the Magyar Sojtó, his leading articles, afterwards collected and published under the title of Alföldi Levelek (Letters from the Alföld), being by far the most important contribution to the controversy. When the Diet was again summoned by royal decree on 10 December 1865, Tisza once more represented Debreczen and formed, with Kálmán Ghyczy, the Left-centre party.

Then, in 1867, on behalf of the Hungarian Parliament, Tisza participated in negotiations with Emperor Franz Joseph I that led to the Compromise of 1867 (German: Ausgleich; Hungarian: Kiegyezés). The importance of this document is that it restored the "Constitutional integrity of Hungary" (Janos 90), with the exception over powers of defense and foreign affairs. These minor concessions by the Emperor soon collated and restored the powers, concerning internal affairs back to the Hungarians. These changed circumstances laid the path for Tisza to rise to the position of Prime Minister. In 1875, he founded the Liberal Party and was elected to the position of Prime Minister of Hungary. The efficiency of the government was initially quite weak and his actions during his 15-year service mainly consisted of reforming the government and the economy.

The newly born government bureaucracy of Hungary was inefficient and lacked a centralized government. One of the first acts performed under the premiership of Kálmán Tisza was the consolidation of power and transformation of the bureaucracy into a single, capable apparatus: "The bureaucracy was in charge of the elections and perpetuating the liberal majority, while parliament and the party would lend an aura of legitimacy to bureaucratic policies and provide a forum to articulate bureaucratic interests" (Janos 97). Kálmán Tisza achieved consolidation of power within the government while Parliament simply served to legitimize those actions. Consolidation of power also consisted of the reform of an incumbent parliament where members came to hold their seats regularly without challenge.

=== Reform of the House of Magnates in Hungary ===
469 members were removed under the provisions of the Parliament Act. The number of Members set to 369 members: 205 hereditary peers, 83 church dignitaries, and a new feature, 81 life members. Aristocratic titles were still given by the imperial power but hereditary and life peerages were to be awarded upon the advice of the Prime Minister who, in case of emergency, could seek the appointment of new members to secure the passage of a particular piece of legislation (Janos 99). These reforms allowed the position of the Prime Minister to be the single most important actor in the Hungarian political arena. These reforms by Tisza allowed him to consolidate power within the Hungarian government and also remove much of the influence extended by the Austrians. He helped to finally set in stone the shift of Hungarian political dependence away from the Austrians.

=== Economic reform ===
Between 1869 and 1875 (with the establishment of the new Hungarian political system), the Hungarians chose to style their economic system under a French model. The problem they encountered was that their current political system was more advanced in comparison to their archaic economic system. For example, taxation of the people came in the form of quasi-military campaigns that only raised taxes by 11% (Janos 106), while it embittered the rural population. Thus, these 6 years were known as a period of poor management of the economy by a failing government.

It was chiefly owing to the efforts of Tisza and his party that Austria remained neutral during the Franco-Prussian War. His speech on 3 March 1875 led to the resignation of István Bittó's administration and the welding of Deák's followers and the Left-centre into a new party, the Szabadelvü pårt or Free Principles Party, which took office under Béla Wenckheim, whom Tisza succeeded as prime minister on October 2.

When Tisza came to power, he consolidated the economy in many ways similar to his power consolidation of the government. He initiated tax reforms saving the state from bankruptcy. In 1889, Sándor Wekerle became Minister of Finance. He collaborated with Tisza to develop a new tax system which focused on taxing the land. The success of these reforms were tremendous, even though the land tax increased by 30%, the revenues of the government increased by 330% (Janos 108). Between 1880 and 1895, public revenue doubled due to the successful tax reforms. Though the Tisza-Wekerle system saved the government from bankruptcy, the tax system proved to be too harsh and eventually prevented the rise of a domestic market for the products produced by Hungary.

== Resignation ==
In 1878 Tisza's brief resignation compelled the Magyar Diet to agree to the occupation of Bosnia. In 1879 he materially contributed to the formation of the Austro-German alliance. Not till 1888, when the national army bill was introduced, did he encounter any serious opposition, but thenceforth his position became precarious. In 1889, as the new citizenship law stipulated that anyone who stayed outside the borders of the Hungarian crown territory for ten consecutive years would lose their Hungarian citizenship. According to this law, Lajos Kossuth who lived in exile in Turin also lost his Hungarian citizenship.

Whether to extend Kossuth's citizenship by a special act of Parliament became a hotly debated issue in the winter of 1889–90, but his citizenship was not officially extended.

The protests that began in early 1890 in response to the news of Kossuth's citizenship being revoked, combined with a tangible and visible loss of popularity both within and outside the party, ultimately led to Tisza's resignation effective March 15, 1890. He attempted to present his departure as a protest against the pressure from the Vienna court to revoke Kossuth's citizenship as well, although in reality, neither he nor his cabinet was particularly concerned about the issue.

After his resignation, he remained a member of parliament and one of the leading figures of his party as deputy for Nagyvárad until his withdrawal in 1901.

== Legacy ==
The contributions made by Kálmán Tisza during his 15-year premiership were tremendous. Although he was born during the midst of a failing Austrian Imperial government in Hungary and he had inherited a failing Hungarian Constitutional government, he managed to turn Hungary into a modern state. He saved his country from going completely bankrupt and consolidated and created an efficient centralized government. His legacy of reform and success gave confidence to a people that were once suppressed by the Austrians and were struggling to master constitutional government. However, he has also been associated with the policy of Magyarization and the imposition of Hungarian hegemony over the various linguistic and ethnic groups in Hungary, as well as consolidating the influence of the Hungarian country gentry on political life. His son István Tisza also became a notable Hungarian politician.

== Orders and decorations ==
- (Austrian Empire) (Kingdom of Hungary) Austria-Hungary: Grand Cross of the Royal Hungarian Order of Saint Stephen, 1880

== Ancestors ==
Kálmán Tisza de Borosjenő's ancestors in three generations
Kálmán Tisza de Borosjenő	Father: Lajos Tisza de Borosjenő	Paternal Grandfather: László Tisza de Borosjenő	Paternal Great-grandfather: László Tisza de Borosjenő
Kálmán Tisza de Borosjenő	Father: Lajos Tisza de Borosjenő	Paternal Grandfather: László Tisza de Borosjenő	Paternal Great-grandmother: Rebekáh Szénás de Bályok
Kálmán Tisza de Borosjenő	Father: Lajos Tisza de Borosjenő	Paternal Grandmother: Katalin Teleki de Szék	Paternal Great-grandfather: Lajos Teleki de Szék
Kálmán Tisza de Borosjenő	Father: Lajos Tisza de Borosjenő	Paternal Grandmother: Katalin Teleki de Szék	Paternal Great-grandmother: Sára Tholdy de Nagyszalonta et Feketebátor
Kálmán Tisza de Borosjenő	Mother: Juliánna Teleki de Szék	Maternal Grandfather: József Teleki de Szék	Maternal Great-grandfather: József Teleki de Szék
Kálmán Tisza de Borosjenő	Mother: Juliánna Teleki de Szék	Maternal Grandfather: József Teleki de Szék	Maternal Great-grandmother: Janka Róth de Királyfalva
Kálmán Tisza de Borosjenő	Mother: Juliánna Teleki de Szék	Maternal Grandmother: Zsófia Teleki de Szék	Maternal Great-grandfather: Lajos Teleki de Szék
Kálmán Tisza de Borosjenő	Mother: Juliánna Teleki de Szék	Maternal Grandmother: Zsófia Teleki de Szék	Maternal Great-grandmother: Sára Tholdy de Nagyszalonta et Feketebátor

== Bibliography ==
- Andrew C. Janos, The Politics of Backwardness in Hungary 1825–1945, Princeton: Princeton University Press, 1982.
- Bain, Robert Nisbet (1911). "Tisza, Kálmán" . Encyclopædia Britannica. Vol. 26 (11th ed.). pp. 1016–1017.

Political offices
Preceded by Gyula Szapáry	Minister of the Interior; 1875–1887	Succeeded by Béla Orczy
Preceded by Béla Wenckheim	Prime Minister of Hungary; 1875–1890	Succeeded by Gyula Szapáry
Preceded by Kálmán Széll	Minister of Finance; Acting; 1878	Succeeded by Gyula Szapáry
Preceded by Béla Wenckheim	Minister besides the King; Acting; 1879	Succeeded by Béla Orczy
Preceded by Gyula Szapáry	Minister of Finance; 1887–1889	Succeeded by Sándor Wekerle
Party political offices
Preceded by New party	Chairman of the Liberal Party; 1875	Succeeded by István Gorove
