= Pázmándy =

Pázmándy is a surname. Notable people with the surname include:

- Dénes Pázmándy (disambiguation), multiple people
- Vilma Pázmándy (1839–1919), Hungarian noblewoman
