= Dénes Pázmándy (1848–1936) =

Hungarian journalist, politician (1848–1936)

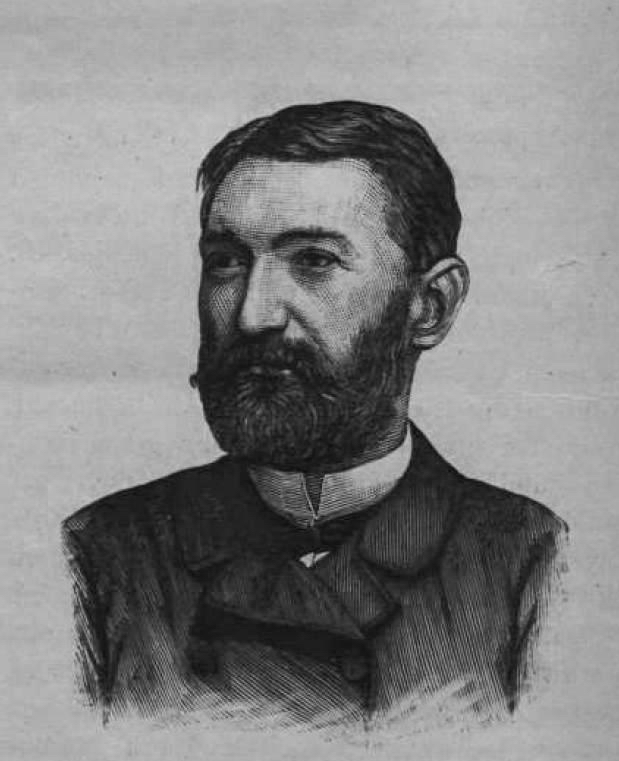
- Born: 10 July 1848; Kömlőd, Kingdom of Hungary
- Died: 1936 (aged 88); Budapest, Kingdom of Hungary
- Children: Dénes (IV) Pázmándy
- Parent(s): Dénes Pázmándy; Lídia Domonkos

Dénes Pázmándy de Szomor et Somodor (10 July 1848 – 1936) was a Hungarian nationalist journalist and politician, member of the Independence Party of 48. He became a member of the Diet of Hungary in 1878. He was involved many nationalist political actions against ethnic independence aspirations. He strongly criticized Triple Alliance and supported the French orientation. He was the counter-revolutionary government's delegate to Paris in 1919.

His father was Dénes Pázmándy, former Speaker of the House of Representatives. One of his sisters was Vilma Pázmándy.
