= Dénes Pázmándy =

Dénes Pázmándy may refer to:

- Dénes Pázmándy (1781–1854), Hungarian landowner and politician
- Dénes Pázmándy (1816–1856), Hungarian landowner and politician, who served as Speaker of the House of Representatives
- Dénes Pázmándy (1848–1936), Hungarian nationalist journalist and politician, member of the Independence Party of 48
