= 220 Stephania =

Dark background asteroid from the inner regions of the asteroid belt

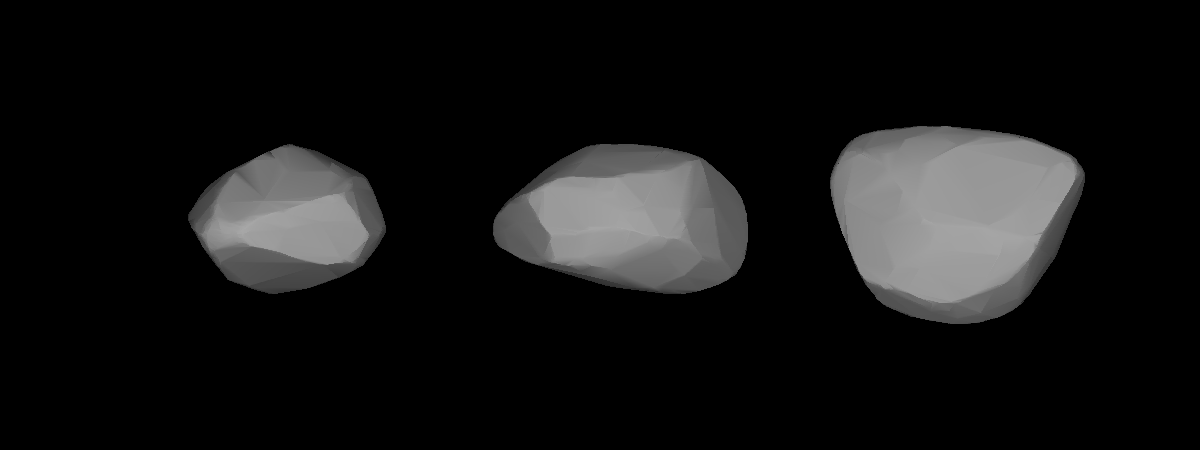
- Lightcurve-based 3D-model of Stephania

Discovery
- Discovered by: J. Palisa
- Discovery site: Vienna Obs.
- Discovery date: 19 May 1881

Designations
- Pronunciation: /stɪˈfeɪniə/
- Named after: Princess Stéphanie (Belgian royalty)
- Alternative designations: A881 KA · 1925 VE; 1931 FP · 1932 UA; 1943 WB · 1946 MA; 1950 TT_{4} · 1961 WB
- Minor planet category: main-belt · (inner) background

Orbital characteristics
- Epoch 4 September 2017 (JD 2458000.5)
- Uncertainty parameter 0
- Observation arc: 86.28 yr (31,514 days)
- Aphelion: 2.9543 AU
- Perihelion: 1.7443 AU
- Semi-major axis: 2.3493 AU
- Eccentricity: 0.2575
- Orbital period (sidereal): 3.60 yr (1,315 days)
- Mean anomaly: 239.16°
- Mean motion: 0° 16^{m} 25.32^{s} / day
- Inclination: 7.5895°
- Longitude of ascending node: 257.92°
- Argument of perihelion: 78.480°

Physical characteristics
- Dimensions: 31.04 km (derived); 31.12±1.5 km 31.738±0.219 km 31.96±9.77 km 32.29±0.33 km 33±2 km 35.097±0.260 km 38.46±5.77 km
- Synodic rotation period: 18.19 h (Note: Anonymous lightcurve –CALL-2011 (web): rotation period 18.19 hours with a brightness amplitude of 0.25 mag. Quality code of 2. Summary figures for (220) Stephania at the LCDB); 18.198 h 18.2±0.2 h 18.21 h (Note: Lightcurve plot of (220) Stephania by Robert A. Koff (a.k.a. William Koff) Antelope Hills Observatory, Colorado (H09); Rotation period 18.21 hours with a brightness amplitude of 0.21 mag. Quality code of 2. Summary figures at the LCDB)
- Geometric albedo: 0.03±0.01; 0.05±0.03; 0.0571±0.0068; 0.0607 (derived); 0.069±0.002; 0.069±0.016; 0.0726±0.007; 0.075±0.015
- Spectral type: Tholen = XC; C · P
- Absolute magnitude (H): 11.00 · 11.10 · 11.2 · 11.35

220 Stephania is a dark background asteroid from the inner regions of the asteroid belt, approximately 32 km (20 mi) in diameter. It was discovered on 19 May 1881, by Austrian astronomer Johann Palisa at the Vienna Observatory. The C-type asteroid has a rotation period of 18.2 hours. It was named after Princess Stéphanie of Belgium.

== Classification and orbit ==
Stephania is a non-family asteroid of the main belt's background population, when applying the Hierarchical Clustering Method to its proper orbital elements. It orbits the Sun in the inner asteroid belt at a distance of 1.7–3.0 AU once every 3 years and 7 months (1,315 days). Its orbit has an eccentricity of 0.26 and an inclination of 8° with respect to the ecliptic.

== Discovery and naming ==
Stephania was discovered by Johann Palisa on May 19, 1881, in Vienna. It was the first discovery he made after transferring to the observatory from Pola.

The name honours Crown Princess Stéphanie (1864–1945), wife of the heir-apparent Crown Prince Rudolf of Austria. The couple was married the year the asteroid was discovered. It was the first time that a naming commemorated a wedding and was given as a wedding gift. The official naming citation was mentioned in The Names of the Minor Planets by Paul Herget in 1955 (H 27).

== Physical characteristics ==
=== Spectral type ===
In the Tholen classification, this asteroid's spectrum is ambiguous, close to an X-type and somewhat similar to that of a carbonaceous C-type asteroid (CX). A French spectroscopic survey that observed two dozens of these X-types classified by Tholen, determined that Stephania is in fact a carbonaceous C-type asteroid (rather than an X-type). The Wide-field Infrared Survey Explorer (WISE) has also characterized it as a primitive P-type asteroid.

=== Lightcurves ===
Lightcurve data has also been recorded by observers at the Antelope Hill Observatory (H09), which has been designated as an official observatory by the Minor Planet Center.

=== Diameter and albedo ===
According to the surveys carried out by the Infrared Astronomical Satellite IRAS, the Japanese Akari satellite and the NEOWISE mission of NASA's WISE telescope, Stephania measures between 31.12 and 38.46 kilometers in diameter and its surface has a low albedo between 0.03 and 0.075. The Collaborative Asteroid Lightcurve Link derives an albedo of 0.0607 and a diameter of 31.04 kilometers based on an absolute magnitude of 11.2.
