= József Árpád Koppay =

Hungarian painter (1859–1927)

Baron József Árpád Koppay of Drétomai (15 March 1859 in Vienna – 2 September 1927 in Bad Gastein) was a Hungarian painter and noble, active at the Austrian Imperial Court, and known for his portraits of Princess Stéphanie of Belgium, Empress Elisabeth of Austria, Franz Joseph I of Austria, Archduchess Elisabeth Marie of Austria, Archduke Franz Ferdinand of Austria, William I, German Emperor, and Otto von Bismarck, which are in the collections of the Hungarian National Museum, and displayed at Pannonhalma Archabbey.
