= Vilma Pázmándy =

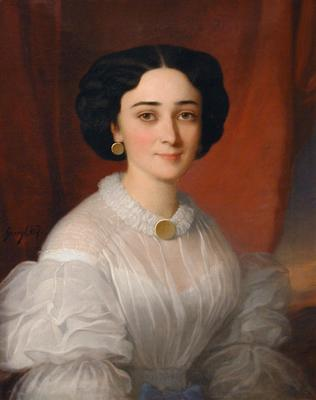
- painted by Alajos Györgyi in 1859
- Born: 1839
- Died: 1919 (aged 79–80)
- Children: Prince Elemér Lónyay

Vilma Pázmándy de Szomor et Somodor (1839–1919) was a Hungarian noblewoman, wife of Count Ödön Lónyay de Nagylónya et Vásárosnamény. She was a daughter of Dénes Pázmándy. Vilma Pázmándy and Ödön Lónyay had four children:

- Gábor (1861–1917)
- Elemér (1863–1946), second husband of Princess Stéphanie of Belgium
- Sarolta
- Vilma (1869-1897)
