= Princess Stéphanie of Belgium =

Crown Princess of Austria (1864–1945)

Stéphanie of Belgium
- Crown Princess of Austria, Hungary and Bohemia; Princess Elemér Lónyay de Nagy-Lónya
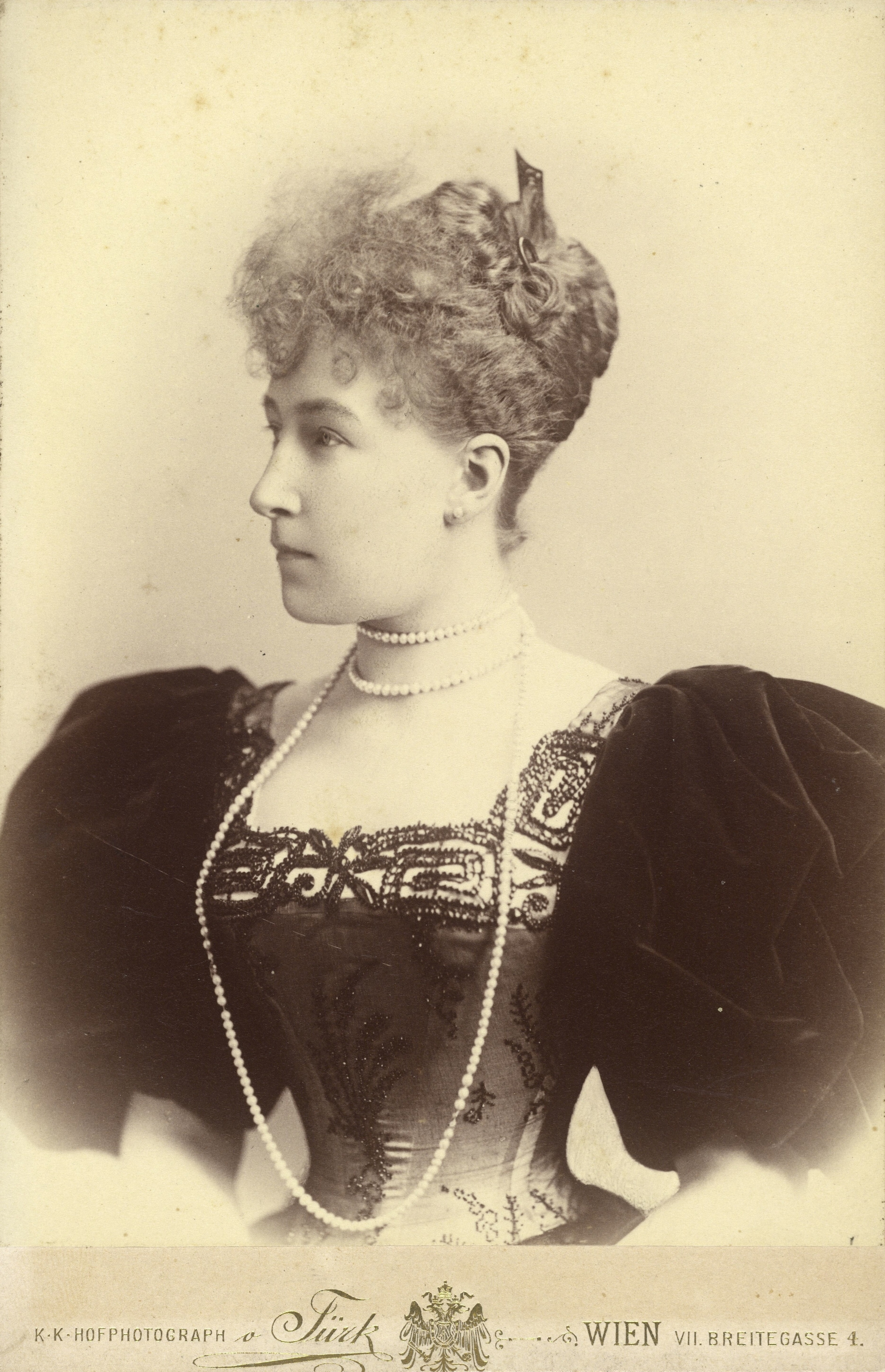
- Crown Princess Stéphanie, c. 1885
- Born: 21 May 1864; Palace of Laeken, Laeken, Brussels, Belgium
- Died: 23 August 1945 (aged 81); Pannonhalma Archabbey, Pannonhalma, Kingdom of Hungary
- Burial: Pannonhalma Archabbey
- Spouse: Rudolf, Crown Prince of Austria (m. 1881; died 1889) Prince Elemér Lónyay of Nagy-Lónya (m. 1900)
- Issue: Archduchess Elisabeth Marie, Princess of Windisch-Graetz
Names
- Stéphanie Clotilde Louise Herminie Marie Charlotte
- House: Saxe-Coburg and Gotha
- Father: Leopold II of Belgium
- Mother: Marie Henriette of Austria

Princess Stéphanie Clotilde Louise Herminie Marie Charlotte of Belgium (21 May 1864 – 23 August 1945) was a Belgian princess who became Crown Princess of Austria through marriage to Crown Prince Rudolf, heir-apparent to the throne of the Austro-Hungarian Empire.

Princess Stéphanie was the second daughter of King Leopold II of the Belgians and Marie Henriette of Austria. She married in Vienna on 10 May 1881 Crown Prince Rudolf, son and heir of Emperor Franz Joseph I of Austria. They had one child, Archduchess Elisabeth Marie. Stéphanie's marriage quickly became fragile. Rudolf, depressed and disappointed by politics, had multiple extramarital affairs, and contracted a venereal disease that he transmitted to his wife, rendering her unable to conceive again. In 1889, Rudolf and his mistress Mary Vetsera were found dead in an apparent murder-suicide pact at the imperial hunting lodge at Mayerling in the Vienna Woods.

In 1900, Stéphanie married again, to Count Elemér Lónyay de Nagy-Lónya et Vásáros-Namény, a Hungarian nobleman of lower rank; for this, she was excluded from the House of Habsburg. However, this second union was happy. After the death of her father in 1909, Stéphanie joined her older sister Louise to claim from the Belgian courts the share of the inheritance of which they both felt they had been stripped.

Until World War II, Count and Countess Lónyay (elevated to the princely rank in 1917) peacefully spent their lives at Rusovce Mansion in Slovakia. In 1935, Stéphanie published her memoirs, entitled Je devais être impératrice ("I Was Going To Be Empress"). In 1944, she disinherited her daughter, who had divorced to live with a socialist deputy and whom she had not seen since 1925. The arrival of the Red Army in April 1945, at the end of the war, forced Stéphanie and her husband to leave their residence and take refuge in the Pannonhalma Archabbey in Hungary. Stéphanie died of a stroke in the abbey later the same year.

== Life ==
=== Early years ===
==== Family background and birth ====
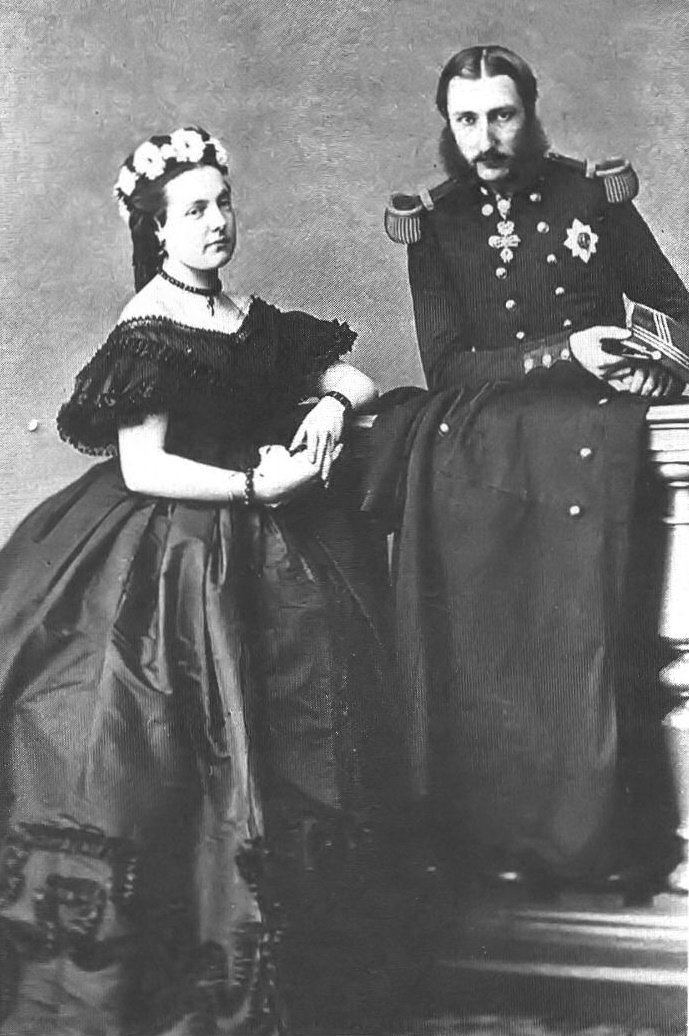
The Duke and Duchess of Brabant. Photography by Ghémar Frères, 1864.

Stéphanie was the third child of the Duke (future King Leopold II) and Duchess of Brabant (born Archduchess Marie Henriette of Austria), an unhappy and mismatched couple. In 1853, their marriage had been arranged for exclusively political reasons by both King Leopold I and the Habsburgs without consulting the groom and bride, whose interests were almost entirely opposed: the Duke of Brabant was little interested by family life and was passionate about political and economic issues in the kingdom which he was to reign over, while Marie Henriette was a young woman versed in religion with other interests limited to horseback riding, dogs and music.

Born at the Palace of Laeken on 21 May 1864, Stéphanie received an emergency baptism on the day of her birth. The official baptism took place one month later, on 25 June, in a ceremony which lasted an hour, in the chapel of the Palace of Laeken, where she received the names Stéphanie Clotilde Louise Herminie Marie Charlotte; her first two names were in honor of her godparents, her maternal uncle Archduke Stephen of Austria, titular Palatine of Hungary) and her aunt by marriage Princess Clotilde of Saxe-Coburg and Gotha. After the ceremony, a gala lunch was given with 60 people in attendance.

Stéphanie had two older siblings: Louise (born 18 February 1858), and Leopold, Count of Hainaut (born 12 June 1859). On 10 December 1865, her paternal grandfather King Leopold I, founder of the Belgian dynasty, died after a reign of 34 years. His son, Stéphanie's father, ascended to the throne under the name of Leopold II, and her brother assumed the title of Duke of Brabant as the new heir of the throne.

==== A family and dynastic drama ====
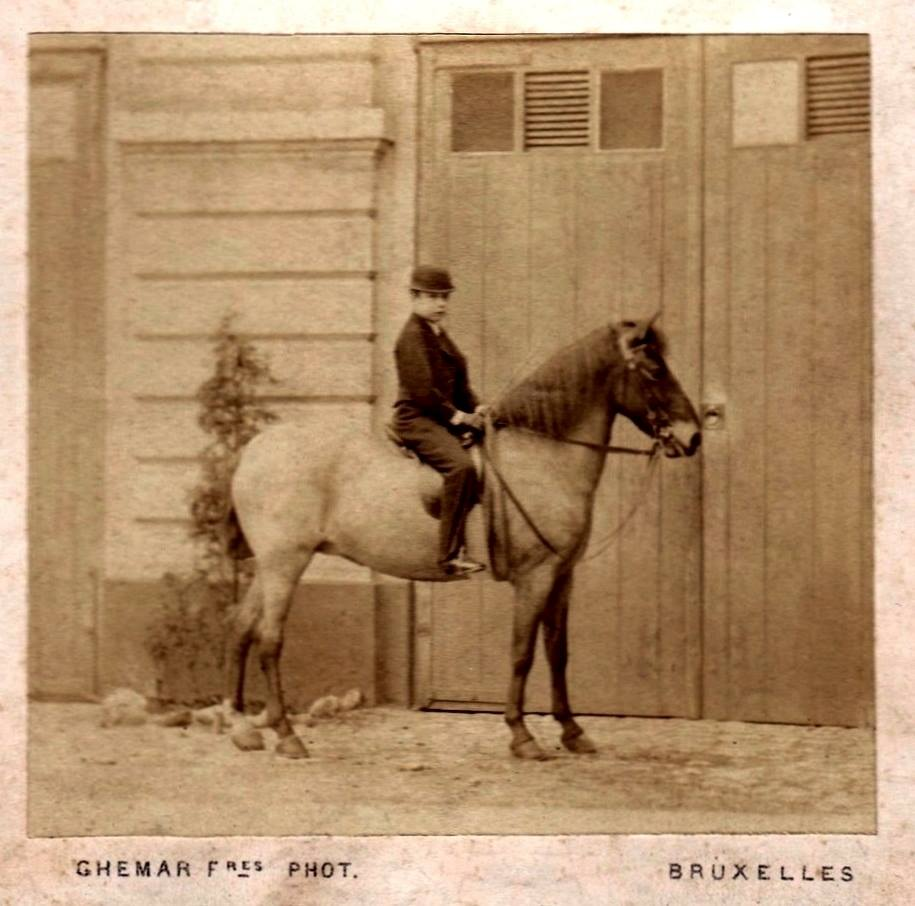
Leopold, Duke of Brabant with his pony Kiss me quick. Photography by Ghémar Frères, 1868.

In the spring of 1868, the almost 9-year-old Leopold, Duke of Brabant and heir to the throne, suffered from a chill following a fall in the pond in the Park of Laeken. His condition deteriorated rapidly: the doctor diagnosed acute pericarditis. In the summer, he seemed to recover, but his cough persisted. The doctor recommended the removal of the uvula and performed this surgery before his young patient went to Ostend to recover. Queen Marie Henriette isolated herself in Spa to rest, while King Leopold II, held back by affairs of state, and his two daughters remained in Laeken. In August, Leopold, suffering from dropsy, was brought back to Laeken. The Queen thenceforth never left her son's bedside. After having received the last sacraments in September, the son seemed better, but his condition worsened again until he died on 22 January 1869.

In her memoirs, Stéphanie wrote: "The first event that was deeply engraved in my memory was the death of this beloved brother [...]. Although I was only four and a half years old, I still vividly remember this deliciously beautiful and tender child, his resignation during his short illness, and the poignant pain of my mother, when he exhaled in her arms". Stéphanie's childhood was therefore marked by this mourning: "From that moment on, my memories have seen my parents' married life darken. Struck in the heart by the death of her son, my mother had changed a lot: this child had been the goal of her life, he had reconciled her with the fate that had fallen to her".

At the beginning of 1871, epidemics of typhus and smallpox raged in Brussels. The Queen, without worrying about potential contagion, assisted affected families. On 10 April, Stéphanie, who was not yet seven, contracted typhus, to the dismay of her parents, who feared that a second child of theirs would die. For many weeks, the girl was unconscious, feverish and in great pain. Her relatives prepared her for death. Her father often came to see her, and her mother and the faithful Toni Schariry, a nanny of German origin hired shortly after Stéphanie's birth, wept at her bedside. The princess was saved only by the care of an unknown Ardennes doctor, whom the royal couple had consulted, who recommended cold baths. The fever decreased and in October, Stéphanie was considered to have recovered. After the recovery of their daughter, Léopold II and Marie Henriette took her and her sister to make her convalescence in Biarritz, making a stopover in Paris.

Leopold nourished the hope of having a second son and therefore resumed sexual relations with the Queen; but, after a miscarriage in March 1871, another daughter was born on 30 July 1872: Clémentine, the last child of the royal couple. Stéphanie relates about her parents: "It is sad and discouraging to think that these two beings [...] could not live better together and create a home. But unfortunately, they did not understand each other. Their paths crossed for a single instant, only to move away immediately and forever. He chose that of indifference, infidelity, she had to accept that of resignation, loneliness and pain". Leopold II thereafter lost interest in his family; he turned his attentions to the notorious creation of the Congo Free State, which was his personal fiefdom and not a Belgian colonial territory, and as such its ruthless exploitation amassed him a vast private fortune. He also rejected his family for his mistresses – having so many scandalous liaisons that he was known to his subjects as Le Roi des Belges et des Belles (“The King of the Belgians and of the Beauties”).

==== Instruction and education ====
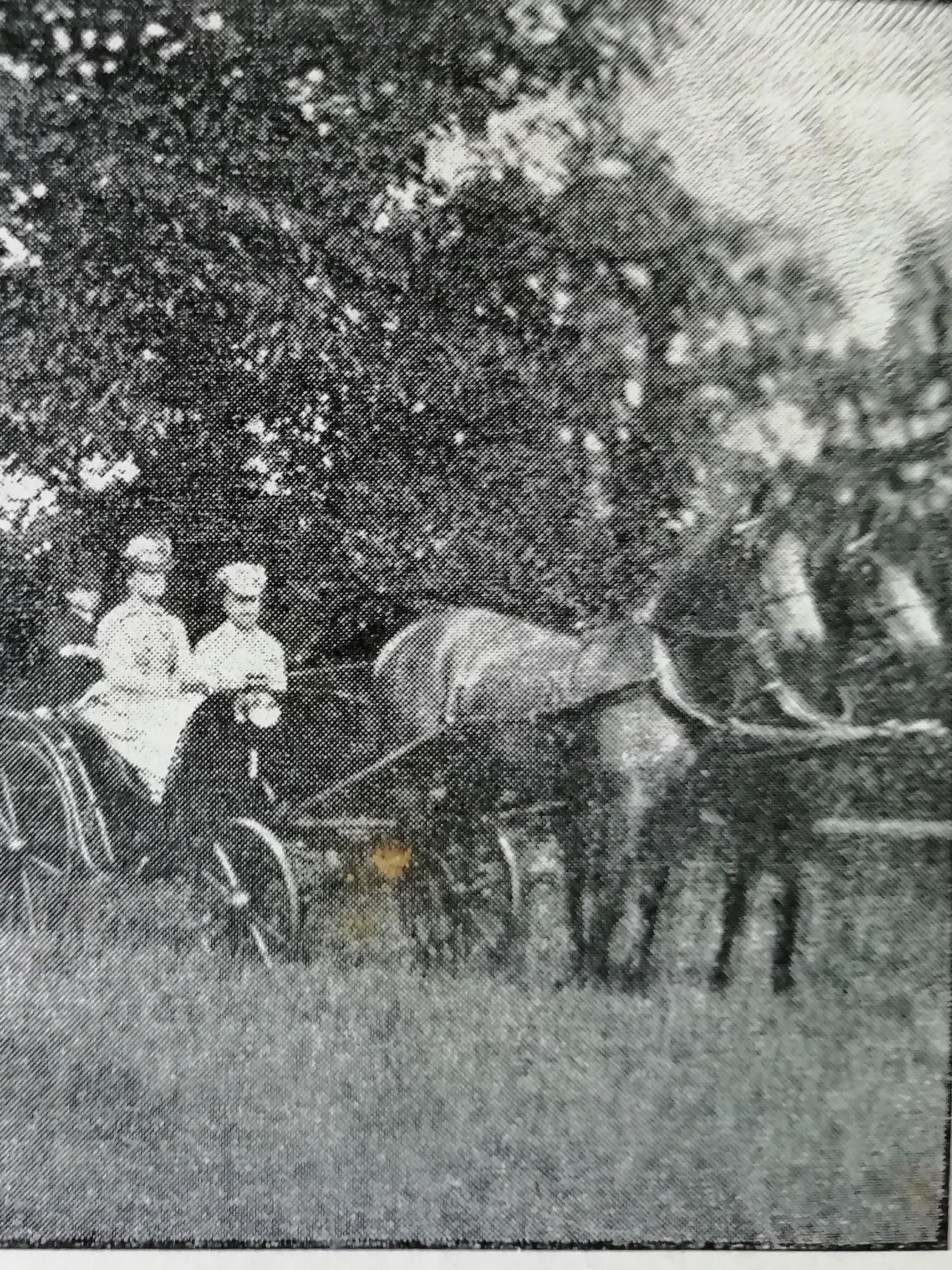
Queen Marie Henriette and her daughter Louise driving a carriage. Photography by Géruzet Frères, ca. 1874.

From 1874, Stéphanie (who until then had a nanny, the Viennese Antoinette Polsterer) was placed under the direction of her sister Louise's governess, Mademoiselle Legrand. Stephanie writes: "My education began at the age of ten; I immediately understood that from that moment books and notebooks would take the place of my toys, that a more orderly life would begin". Stéphanie benefitted from schooling by teachers who provided her with various courses: French, English, German, Dutch and Hungarian for languages, while mathematics lessons, horsemanship, history, history of art, religion, botany, and rhetoric were also taught. However, the level of education of the princesses was not very high: "The programs lacked scope. In the severe decor of the study room, it was usually too rudimentary that we applied ourselves to history, geography, literature, mathematics; a preponderant place being left to the decorative arts: painting, drawing, music, as well as needlework".

If Stéphanie's instruction was somewhat rudimentary, the discipline was strict: "We got up early in the morning: in summer, at five o'clock, in winter, at six o'clock. During our toilet, the most absolute silence was required; any breach of this rule resulted in severe punishment. We had to dress and comb our hair on our own. The maid stood in the room and watched us. In order to test us, the housekeeper often made unexpected entries. [...] Our dresses were as simple as our hairstyles. Cut in the shape of a shirt, they fell without any trim, below the knee; a leather belt held them back. In order to toughen us up, the windows of our bedroom, summer and winter, remained open: we rarely heated". Louise and Stéphanie had to dust their room themselves. Sometimes they joined the King and Queen at breakfast time. At their table, adorned with flowers, were sweets that the princesses were not allowed to taste. When Stéphanie was punished, she had to kneel on dry peas or remain locked up for hours, in the dark, between double doors. Stephanie and Louise had lunch and dinner with their parents after their governess reported their behavior to the Queen. When the King entered the dining room, the princesses would rise and bow before kissing his hand which he then put on their head, without a word. Only the girls' maid Toni showed them constant affection. The feast days, Easter, Saint Nicholas Day and Christmas, were the only times when Stéphanie and her sisters were pampered.

=== Crown Princess of Austria-Hungary ===
==== Marriage projects ====
While her older sister Louise married in 1875 a wealthy cousin of their father, Prince Philipp of Saxe-Coburg and Gotha, Austrian officer and friend of Rudolf, Crown Prince of Austria, Stéphanie continued her studies and willingly took care of her younger sister Clémentine because Louise's departure left a void at the Palace of Laeken.

Stéphanie made her first communion on 12 June 1876 and officially appeared for the first time at court. A few months later, Louise and her husband went to Brussels. Stéphanie found her older sister, who had turned into a "young woman admired and celebrated", very different from the young girl she had known.

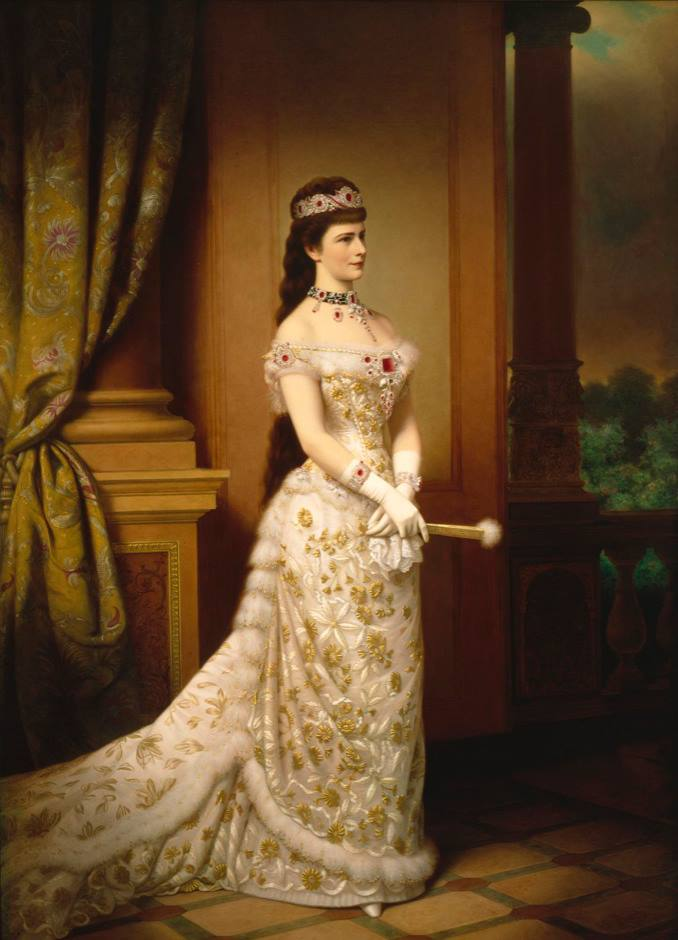
Empress Elisabeth of Austria, by Georg Martin Ignaz Raab, 1879.

During the winter of 1878–1879, on her way to London, Empress Elisabeth of Austria (known as "Sisi"), mother of Crown Prince Rudolf, stopped at the court of Brussels, where the 14-year-old Stéphanie was introduced to her. Already rumors about her possible marriage were swirling in Europe. Leopold II and Marie Henriette hoped to marry their second daughter to a reigning sovereign or a crown prince. The first candidate mentioned was King Alfonso XII of Spain, but this possibility was almost immediately denied.

Stéphanie had heard of Rudolf for the first time at the end of a literature class given by her housekeeper Fanny Brossel. After reading the story of William Tell, the teacher decided to teach her pupil about the power and grandeur of the House of Habsburg and illustrated her words by showing her an engraving published in a magazine depicting the Crown Prince in hunting costume. This was how Stéphanie discovered the features of the one who would become her fiancé.

During the winter of 1879–1880, Empress Elisabeth returned to Brussels. She was persuaded by the arguments of the court of Vienna which encouraged the Crown Prince to marry young in order to quickly ensure descendants. In March 1880 Rudolf was invited to the Belgian court at the insistence of Leopold II. After meeting the 15-year-old Princess Stéphanie, he wrote to his mother that "[he had] found what [he] sought", noting that she was "pretty, good, [and] clever". However, she was not Rudolf's first choice as a potential bride: having refused Princess Mathilde of Saxony, as well as several Infantas of Portugal and Spain, he found that Stéphanie was one of the few Catholic princesses who met the criteria imposed by his father Emperor Franz Joseph I to become wife of the heir of the Austro-Hungarian Empire. Under pressure from his parents to marry as soon as possible, the Crown Prince was satisfied with Stéphanie and on 5 March, he asked her parents for her hand. The reaction of Rudolf's parents was mixed – while Empress Elisabeth was deeply disappointed with the match as the Belgian monarchy dated only from 1830 and did not compare to the Habsburgs in terms of seniority, even though its royal house was a branch of the House of Wettin (one of the oldest ruling houses in Europe), Emperor Franz Joseph I was pleased. For her part, Stéphanie remembered: "In the afternoon of 5 March, my parents called me. When I made my entrance, my father stood up, came to me and said in a deep voice: "The Crown Prince of Austria-Hungary has come here to ask for your hand. Your mother and I are all in favor of this marriage. We have chosen you to be Empress of Austria and Queen of Hungary. Go away, think about it and give us your answer tomorrow".

==== Engagement and marriage ====
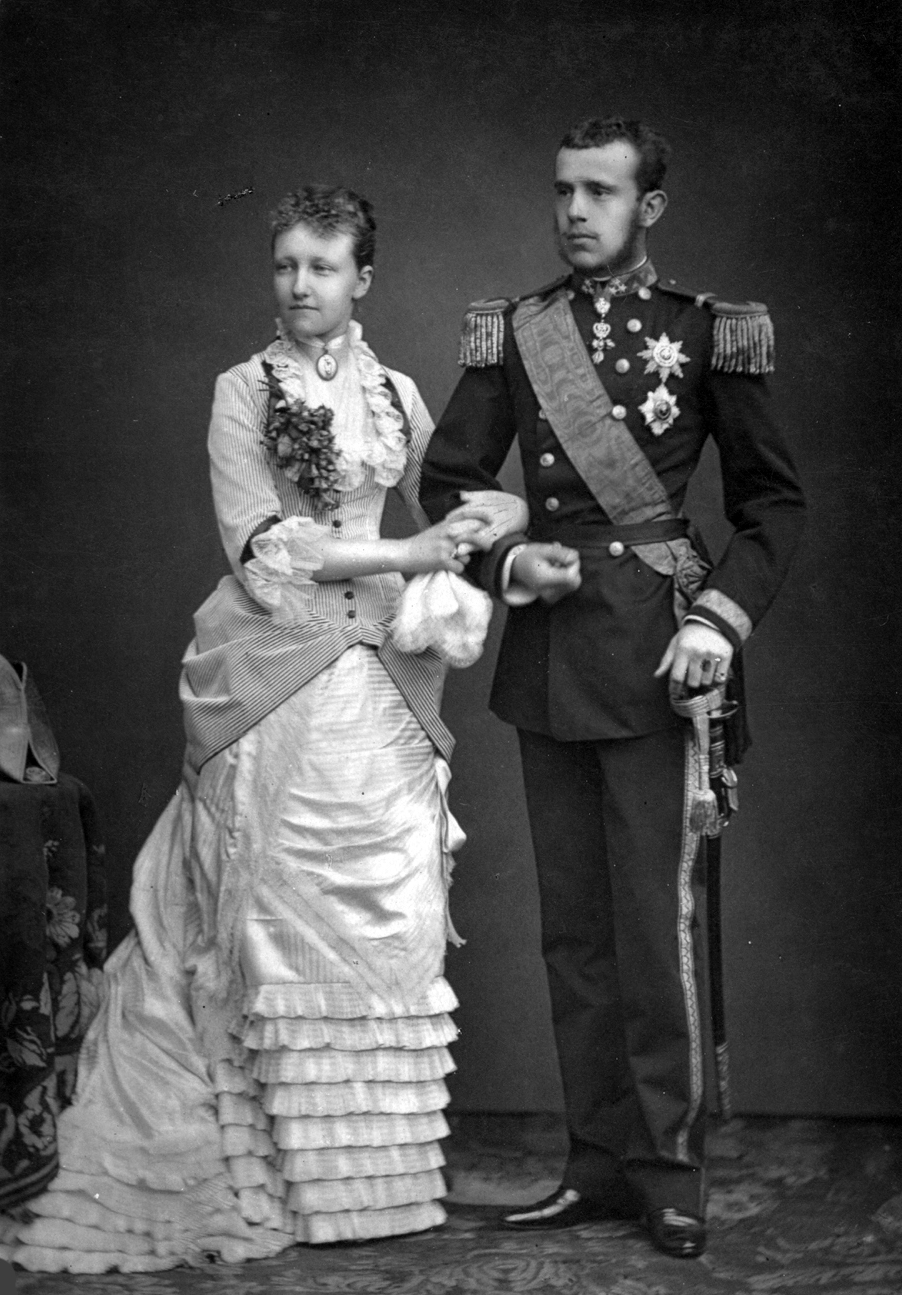
Princess Stéphanie and her fiancé Rudolf, Crown Prince of Austria. Photography by Géruzet Frères, March 1880.

The betrothal was formalized on 7 March 1880, when Stéphanie was not yet 16 years old. Rudolf went to Brussels accompanied by an official suite of 21 people, and his current mistress. To his tutor, the Crown Prince confided, "A new life will soon begin for me and I must admit that this worries me a little".

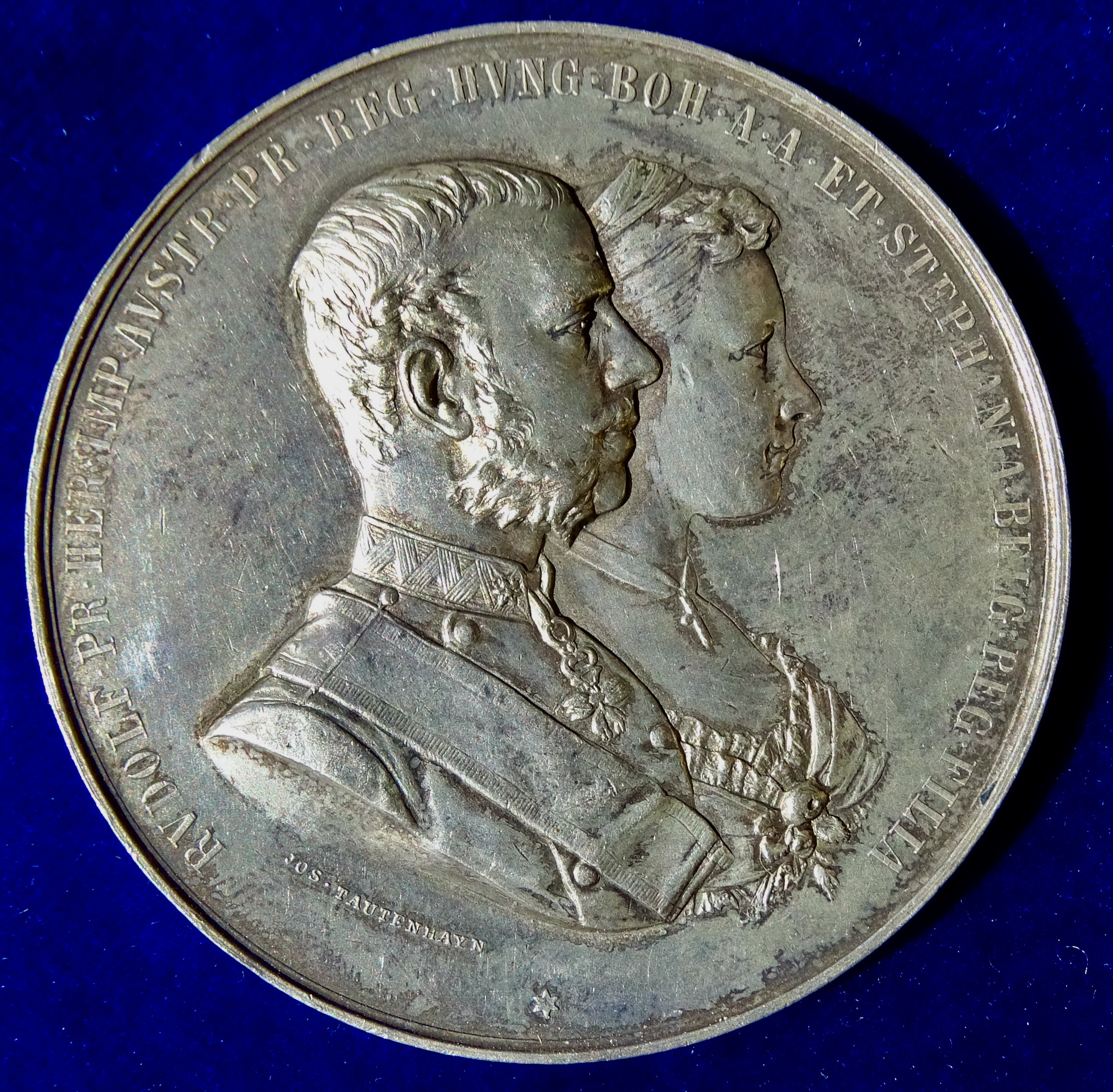
Wedding medal 1881 by Tautenhayn, obverse

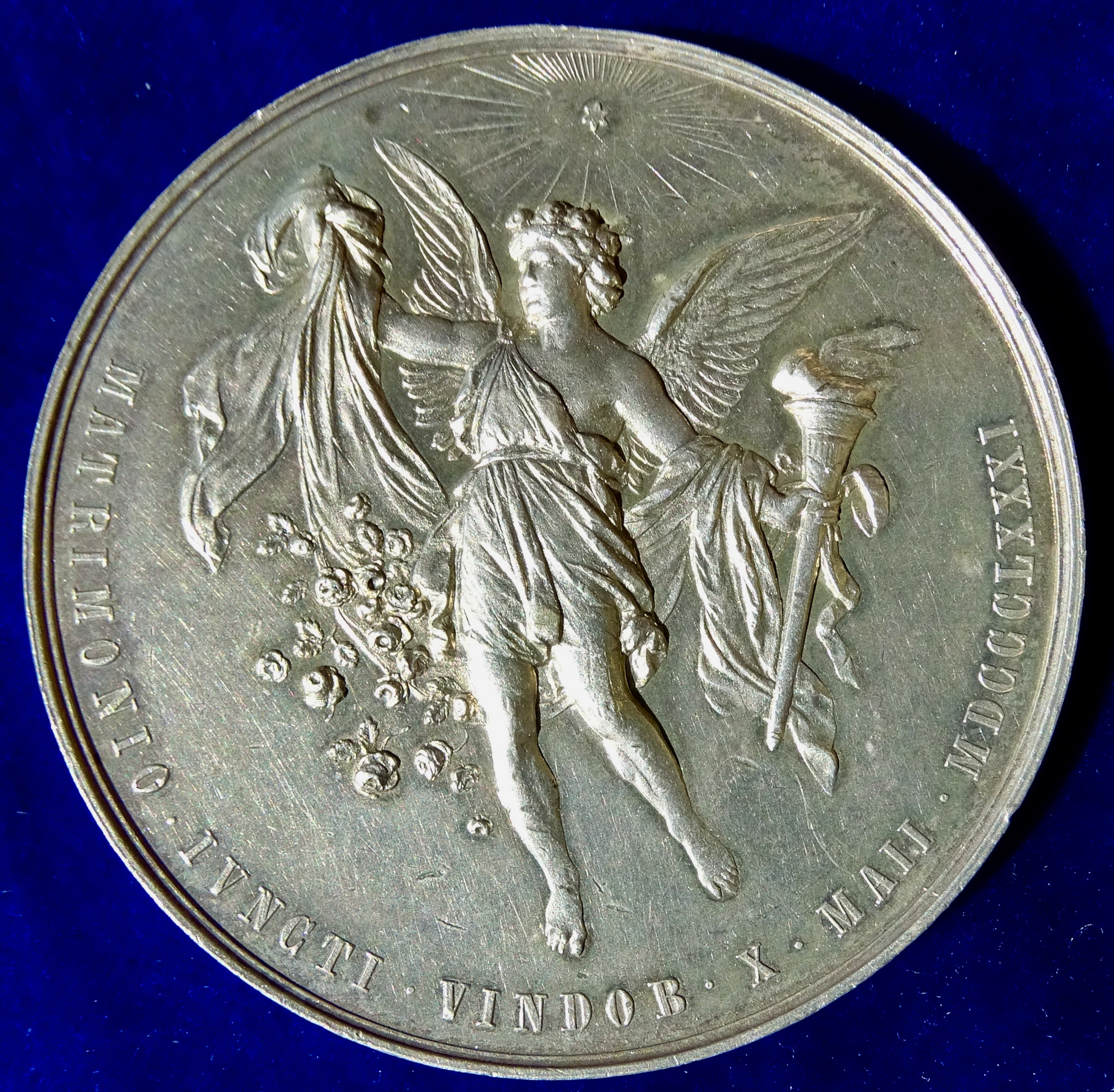
The reverse of this 1881 wedding medal showing Hymen the god of marriage

The Crown Prince was 21 years old at the time of the engagement. Declared an adult at the age of 19, he already had his own household. In 1879 he had moved to Prague Castle and assumed command of an infantry regiment, a post he liked very much. He was friendly with Princess Louise of Belgium, who had encouraged him to marry her younger sister. In anticipation of her establishment at the Austrian court, her mother Marie Henriette had warned Stéphanie: "Avoid Louise, and if you see her, reason with her, show her a good example [...] Louise is not true. It costs nothing to lie or act. She is very frivolous". Rudolf's personality was ambiguous: Often subject to mood swings, he suddenly passed from a melancholy state to an expansive joy, and he was aware of the duality of his temperament. Very young, he became a bon vivant and indulged in morally lax behaviour. The marriage was supposed to end his affairs. Countess Marie Larisch von Moennich, niece of Empress Elisabeth, had declared about Rudolph's future fiancée: "In advance, we had pity on the poor princess who would have the honor of being chosen".

The preparations for the wedding filled King Leopold II with pride. The Austrian Emperor added 148,000 guilders to the initial dowry of 100,000 florins, plus an annual sum of 100,000 florins for the duration of the marriage. Engaged, Stéphanie was dispatched to Vienna to be taught Imperial court etiquette in preparation for her marriage, and then had to attend all official receptions and dinners until her wedding, which was scheduled for 15 February 1881; however the wedding had to be deferred because Stéphanie had not yet reached puberty, and the bride was returned home for a while.

The marriage was finally celebrated on 10 May 1881, a few days before Stéphanie's 17th birthday, at the Saint Augustine's Church in Vienna. Four thrones were arranged under a canopy for the Belgian and Austrian sovereigns, with the bride being walked down the aisle by her parents. Foreign princes (among them the future King Edward VII of the United Kingdom and his nephew, the future German Emperor Wilhelm II) and members of the imperial family attended the celebrations, alongside members of the diplomatic corps and the Knights of the Golden Fleece. The church was so crowded that the wedding procession was hampered in its progress. Stéphanie remembered, "Both of us pronounced the sacramental 'yes'. We exchanged alliances [...]. The bells of the whole city rang to announce to the inhabitants of the capital the celebration of our solemn marriage. A long, cheerful noise arose from the crowd. Military bands played the hymns of the two countries. I was the Crown Princess of Austria-Hungary!". As a part of the wedding celebrations, the Emperor bestowed Walthère Frère-Orban with the Order of Saint Stephen of Hungary and the Empress bestowed several ladies with the Order of the Starry Cross.

==== At the court of Vienna ====
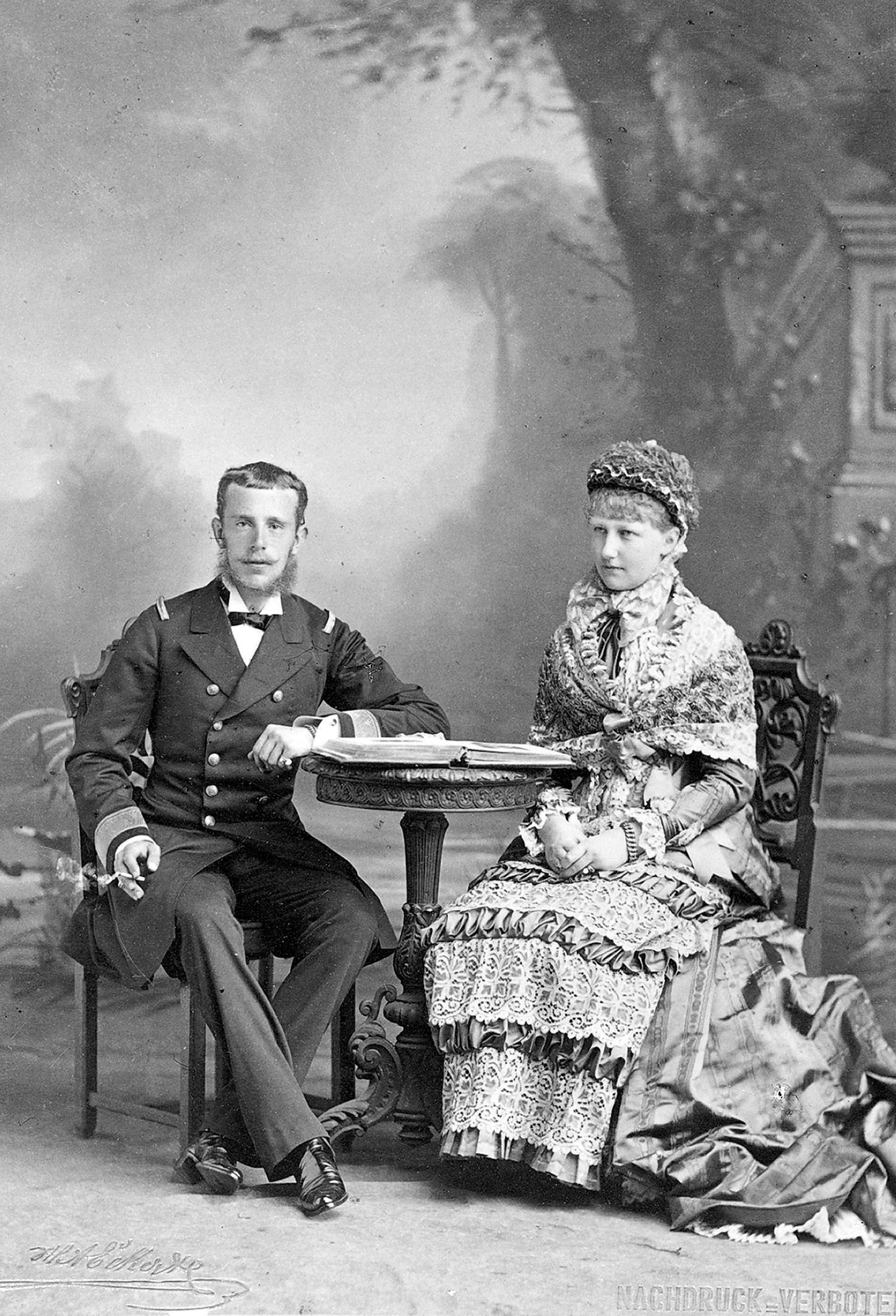
The Crown Prince and Crown Princess of Austria. Photography by Jindřich Eckert, 1882.

After the wedding night, which Stéphanie in her private letters revealed to her sister to have been a violent event by Rudolf, already mentally unstable, the couple honeymooned at Laxenburg outside the capital. Stéphanie was soon subjected to the questioning of her new family: At the court of Vienna, she had to live most of the time with them – walks, canoeing parties, invitations and parties were almost always held with the many members of the House of Habsburg. Her mother-in-law, Empress Elisabeth, nicknamed her "the hideous dromedary"; however, Stephanie began to enjoy her new position. During an official visit to Hungary in May 1881, she was given a standing ovation and began to see the advantages of her situation.

As in any dynastic marriage where the political interest of the two sovereign houses takes precedence, the existence of romantic feelings within the couple has never been proven, but the relationship of the young spouses was based, at the beginning, on respect and a mutual attachment. The spouses gave nicknames to each other respectively: "Coco" for Rudolf, and "Coceuse" for Stéphanie. Their understanding was real; Stéphanie described Rudolf as "a model husband" and added that they understood each other admirably, which made her happy. However, Stéphanie related that Rudolf was suspicious when she accompanied him. She was not allowed to leave the palace and remained subject to strict surveillance, so she took the opportunity to devote herself to drawing or painting.

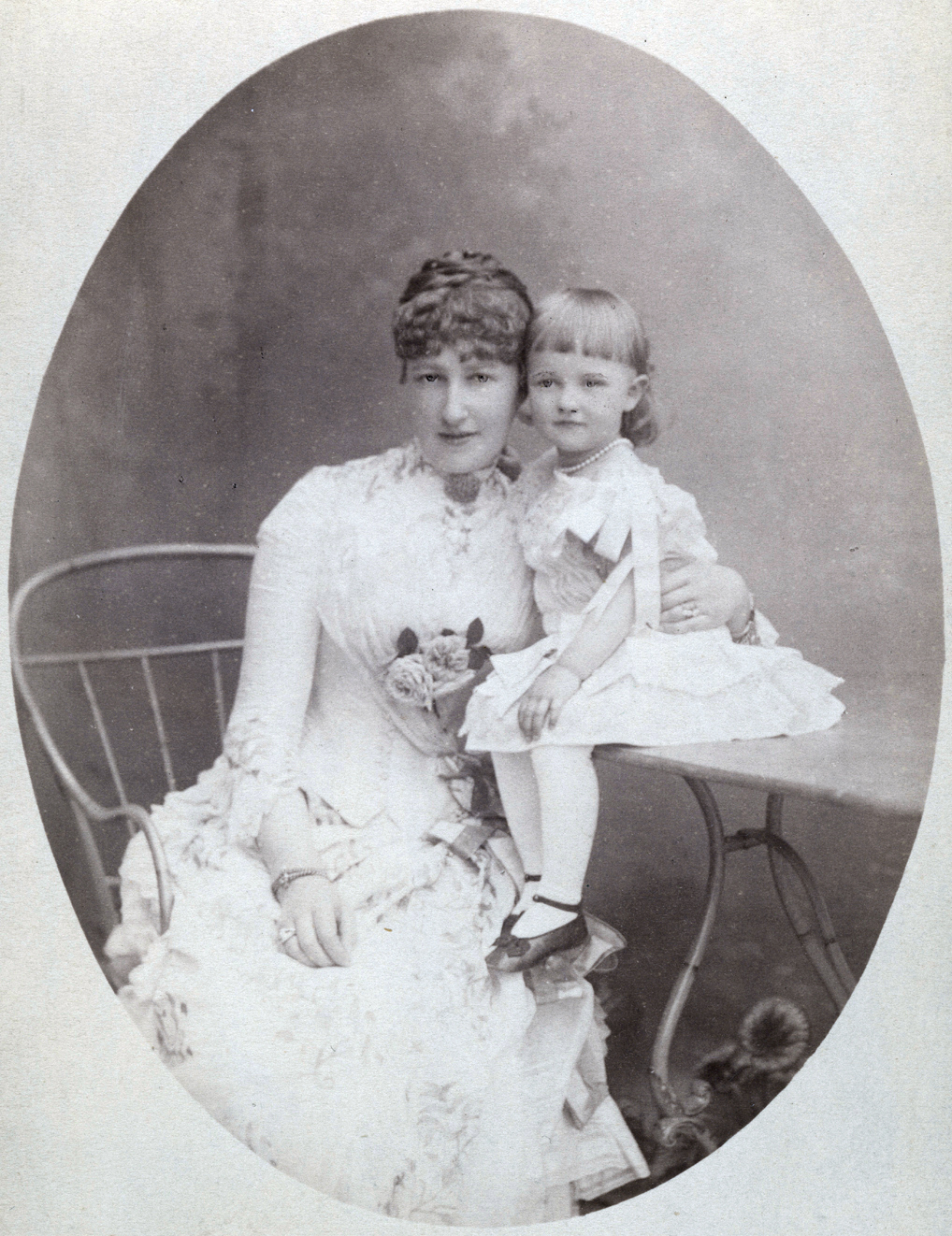
The Crown Princess with her daughter Archduchess Elisabeth Marie, 1885.

From October 1881, Stéphanie replaced the Empress at official receptions. It was she who, at the request of her mother-in-law, now accompanied the Emperor and the Crown Prince on official trips and who received foreign sovereigns visiting the court. She entered the ballrooms on her father-in-law's arm and served as the hostess at official dinners. Delighted to be released from the "official duties", Empress Elisabeth withdrew from court, while Rudolf broke away from his wife to whom he became less and less warm.

In the autumn of 1881, Stéphanie thought she was pregnant, but it was a false alarm. After this disappointment, in the spring of 1883, the Crown Princess's pregnancy was confirmed, delighting the Emperor. After this announcement, the Crown Prince once again became considerate and attentive to his wife. Both Stéphanie and Rudolf were sure it would be a boy; they even spoke of the future child by calling him "Wenceslaus" (Wacław), a Czech first name reflecting the sympathies of the Crown Prince for the Slavic populations of the Austro-Hungarian Empire.

On 8 August, Queen Marie Henriette visited her daughter in anticipation of her childbirth. Stéphanie did not dare talk about her marital problems with her mother. The preparations for a princely birth obeyed protocol: prayers in churches and the exhibition of the Blessed Sacrament in the churches of the imperial palaces. On 2 September in the Laxenburg castles complex, Stéphanie gave birth to a daughter, Elisabeth Marie, known as "Erzsi" (short for Erzsébet, the Hungarian form of Elisabeth). Generously, Emperor Franz Joseph I showered the young mother and her family with gifts. When the sex of the child was announced to Rudolf, he did not hide his disappointment at not having been given an heir to Austria-Hungary Empire, but he got used to his role of father and gave, in his correspondence, many details about the newborn girl. While Stéphanie blossomed in her new role of mother, this birth marked the beginning of deep marital difficulties.

==== Rudolf's disease and its consequences ====
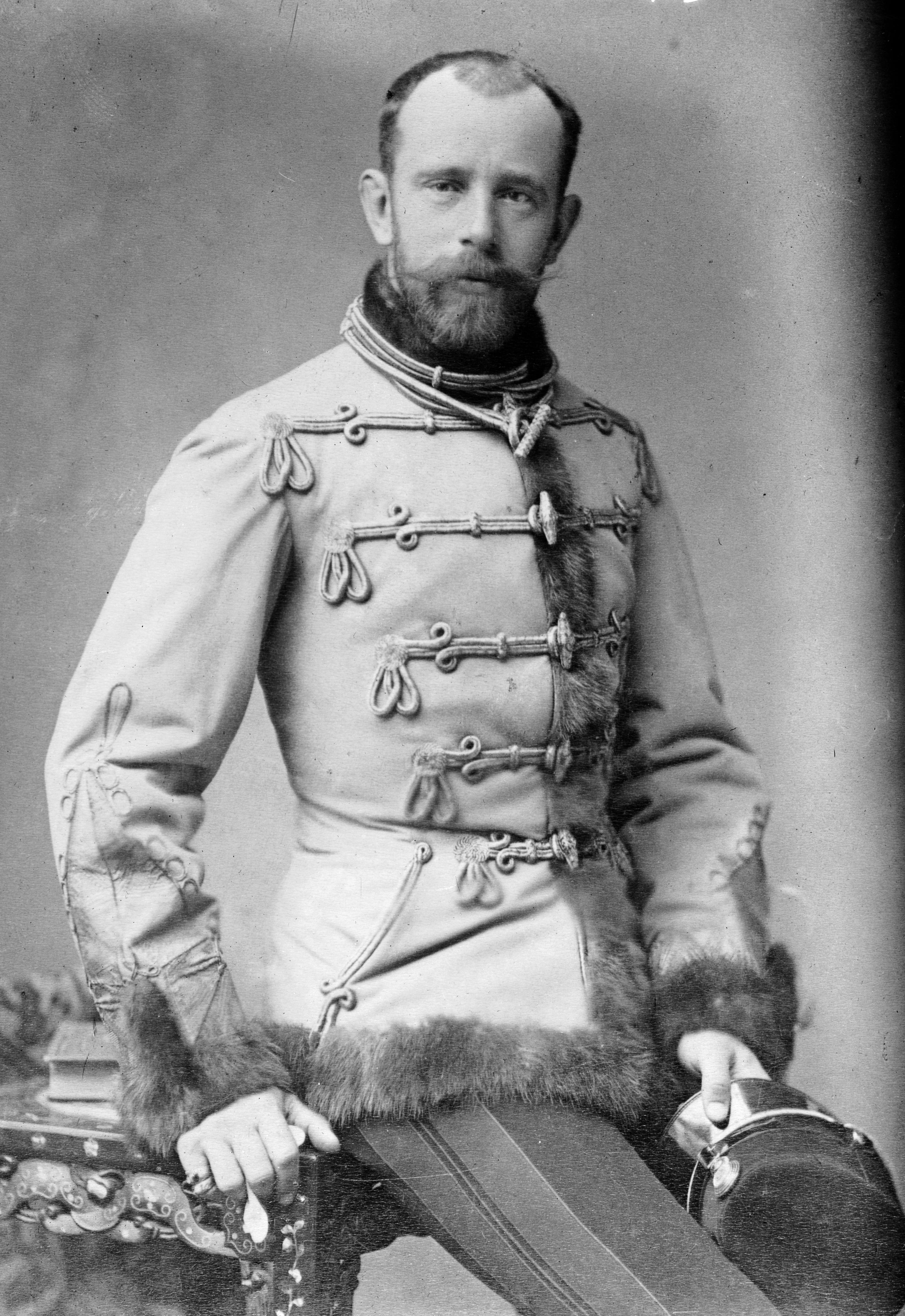
Rudolf, Crown Prince of Austria. Photography by Károly Koller, 1887.

In Prague and Vienna, the couple received many visitors and gave many dinners. Stéphanie had a high idea of her rank and strove to fully assume the role conferred on her by her title, because the Empress had fled Vienna to travel frequently through Europe. For his part, Rudolf, who disapproved of his father's policies, developed friendships among opponents of the monarchy and anonymously published his political opinions in the Neues Wiener Tagblatt, edited by his friend Moritz Szeps. At the beginning of 1886, the Crown Prince fell seriously ill. Several diagnoses included cystitis and stomach disease. These were only intended to hide the true nature of the disease which affected him – he had actually contracted a venereal disease (possibly gonorrhea), during his extramarital affairs. Doctors, fearing syphilis, used the approaches then used to treat the latter, namely opium, cognac, morphine, as well as mercury which, taken at too high a dose, can lead to psychological consequences.

In order to take care of himself, Rudolf left to stay on the island of Lokrum, where he took Stéphanie. No one had informed the Crown Princess of the nature of the illness from which her husband was suffering. When she felt the first effects herself, doctors mentioned peritonitis. The consequences of this lie were dramatic: when the couple tried to conceive another child, Stéphanie, who was not yet 22 years old, found it that she was sterile. From that moment, feeling betrayed by her own husband, Stéphanie harbored resentment and bitterness towards Rudolf. She refused to resume her conjugal life with a husband who did not return until dawn, and disillusioned and undermined by a feeling of failure, had sunk into debauchery. Despite Rudolf's attempts to reconcile with his wife, their quarrel seemed deep. During a visit to the Kingdom of Galicia and Lodomeria in 1887, Stéphanie fell in love with the Polish Count Artur Władysław Potocki. During the next eighteen months, she did not try to hide her affections for the Count from her husband, who continued his own liaisons.

From the spring of 1887, painful scenes were repeated between the spouses. Rudolf began to lose control of himself: suffering from deep fits of melancholy and mania he spoke in front of whoever wanted to hear him the presentiment of his imminent death. During the summer of 1888, Stéphanie noticed a disturbing change in the general condition of the Crown Prince: his increasingly angry character led him to continued public outbursts of extreme violence.

==== The Mayerling incident ====
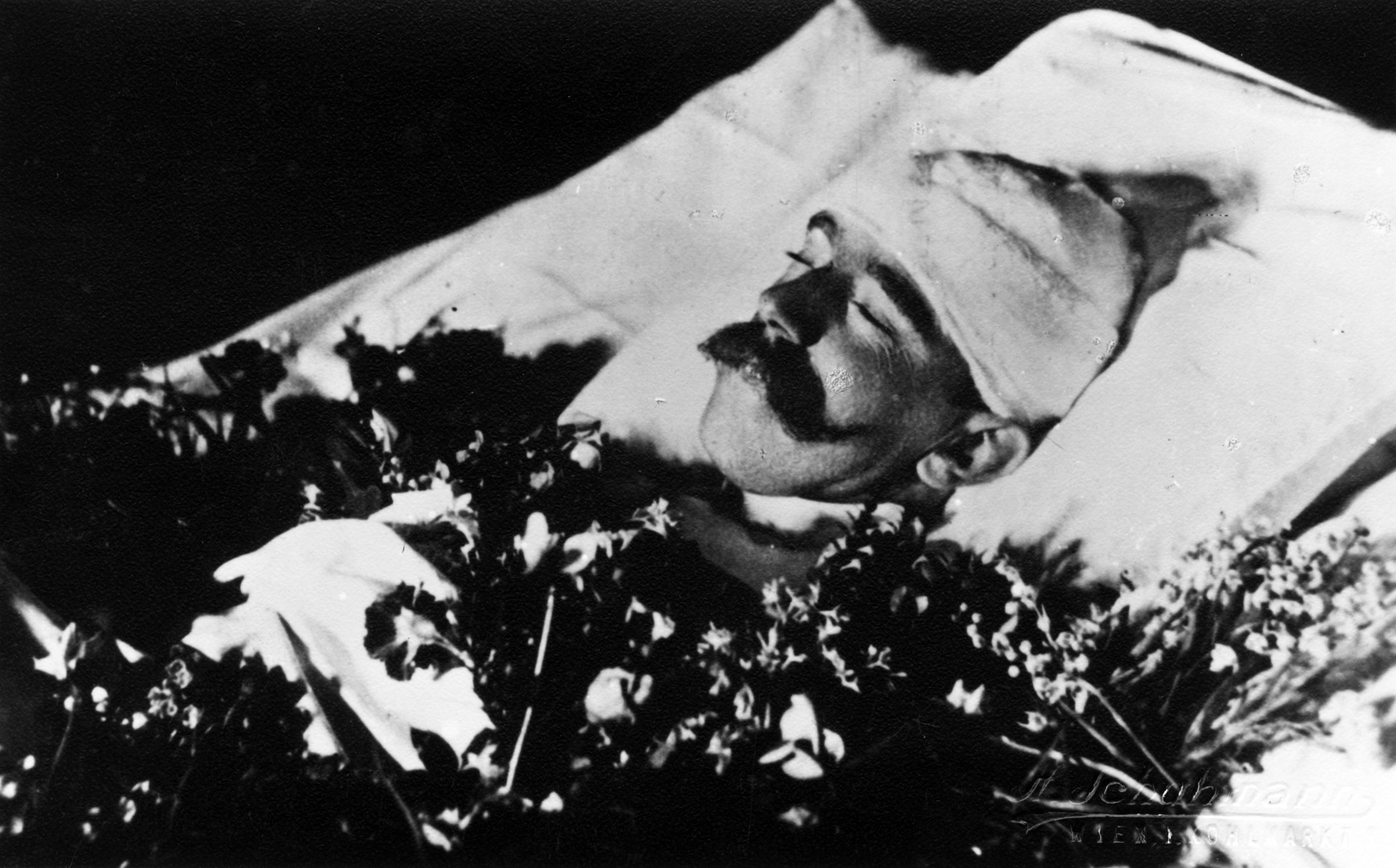
Crown Prince Rudolf lying-in-state, 1889.

In October 1888, Stéphanie, worried about the depressive – even suicidal – tendencies of her husband, went to the Emperor Franz Joseph I to alert him, without succeeding in convincing him. She remembers: "The Emperor greeted me cordially. I began by telling him that Rudolf was very ill and that his pathetic appearance and his dissipated behavior caused me serious concern; I begged him to make his son take a long journey so as to distract him from his grueling existence. But the Emperor interrupted me: "It is your imagination that creates ghosts for you. Rudolf is doing very well. He looks a little tired, he is too often on the road, he exerts himself too much. He should stay more with you; but have no fear!".

Rudolf pursued other connections, in particular with the 17-year-old Baroness Marie Vetsera from around April 1888. Stéphanie became a widow at the age of 24 when, on 30 January 1889, her husband was found dead in strange circumstances with his mistress Baroness Vetsera, both shot dead, at the Mayerling hunting lodge. The apparent suicide of the Crown Prince deeply affected Stéphanie and constituted, in the words of Irmgard Schiel, "the greatest catastrophe that can affect a woman in her married life". To Stéphanie, Rudolf had left an undated letter: "Dear Stéphanie, you are delivered from my fatal presence; be happy in your destiny. Be good to the poor little one who is the only thing left of me. [...] I calmly enter death which alone can save my good reputation. Kissing you with all my heart, your Rudolf who loves you".

=== Dowager Crown Princess ===
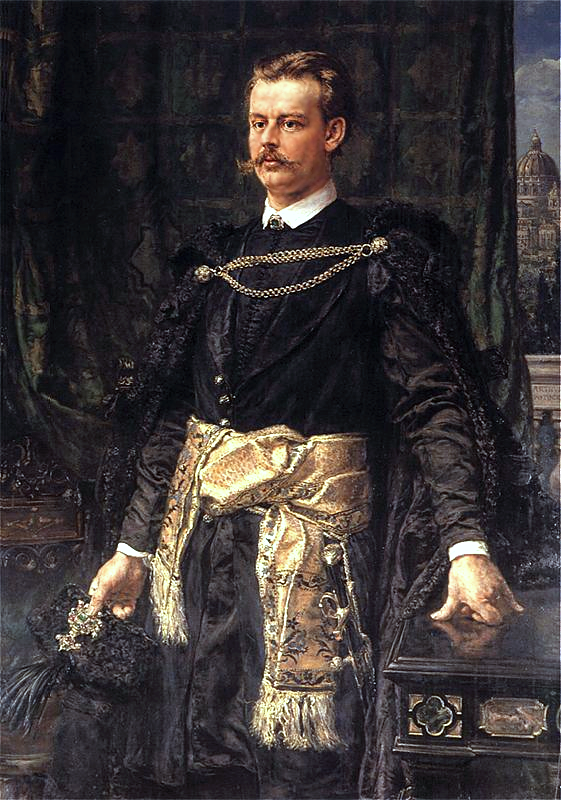
Count Artur Władysław Potocki, with whom Dowager Crown Princess Stéphanie of Austria had a romantic relationship, painted by Jan Matejko, 1890.

After Rudolf's death, Stéphanie had only one thought: to leave Vienna and the heavy atmosphere of the court. She wished to go to her parents in Brussels, but neither Leopold II nor Franz Joseph I would allow Stephanie, who had become a Dowager Crown Princess, to abandon Austria. As guardian of his 5-year-old granddaughter Elisabeth Marie, the Emperor demanded that Stéphanie remain with her child. Stéphanie had to obey and obtained permission to stay for four months at Miramare Castle, near Trieste. At the start of her widowhood, Stéphanie led a rather withdrawn life. Over the years, the separations from her daughter became more and more frequent, so a fulfilling relationship with her daughter did not last.

During this time, Stéphanie continued her romantic relationship with Count Potocki, whom she had nicknamed "Hamlet". Widowed since 1881, he was Chamberlain at the court of Vienna and a life member of the House of Lords in the Austrian Parliament. Only her sister Louise was informed of the affair. Artur Potocki remained close to Stéphanie during the dark days following Rudolf's death. However, the health of the Count, who was not yet 40, was so bad that he lost the ability to speak after surgery due to laryngeal cancer. In March 1890, Potocki died and Stéphanie once again went into a deep grieving.

At the court of Vienna, Stéphanie had to endure the coldness of Empress Elisabeth, who avoided her, and the equally distant attitude adopted by Emperor Franz Joseph I. Although she retained her title of Crown Princess, she did not retain its functions and was no longer authorized to represent the Empress. Her role was limited, and she could no longer count on the support of many friends. She traveled a lot and devoted herself to painting. Her watercolors painted in Lacroma were published as an album in 1892. In Austria, Stéphanie devoted herself to singing or went to the theater and concerts during her stays in her residences in Laxenburg and at the Hofburg.

Until 1898, Stéphanie undertook long journeys each year: Corfu, Malta, Tunis and Sicily in 1892; the Nordic countries the following year; North Africa, the Balearic Islands and Corsica in 1894; Greece and Palestine in 1895; and Russia in 1897. In March 1898, an illness forced her to give up traveling – she suffered from pneumonia and pleurisy, which forced her to remain bedridden for some time. This gave rise to fears for her life before she suddenly recovered. On 10 September 1898, Empress Elisabeth was assassinated in Geneva; even though she had never managed to get closer to her mother-in-law, Stéphanie was very affected by this unexpected death.

=== A new life ===
==== A marriage of inclination ====
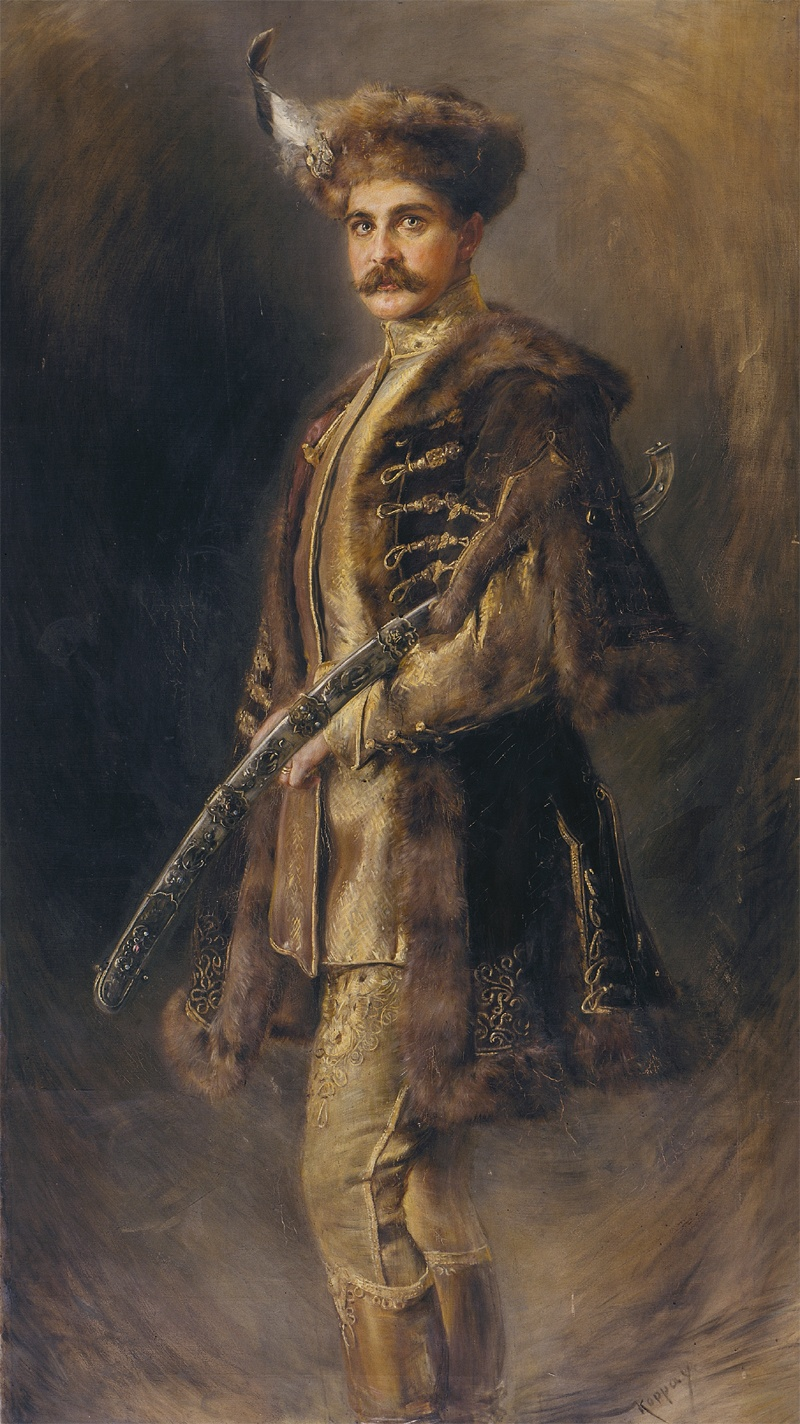
Stephanie's second husband: Count, later Prince Elemér Lónyay de Nagylónya et Vásárosnamény, painted by József Árpád Koppay, ca. 1900.

Emperor Franz Joseph I and King Leopold II of Belgium cherished the plan to remarry Stéphanie with Archduke Franz Ferdinand, heir to the Austria-Hungary Empire after the death of Rudolf. However, the latter harbored other marriage plans with Countess Sophie Chotek von Wognin, the daughter of Bohuslav, Count Chotek, Austrian ambassador to Stuttgart, St. Petersburg and Brussels, and lady-in-waiting to Archduchess Isabella of Austria, Duchess of Teschen.

For her part, Stéphanie planned to marry an aristocrat: Count Elemér Lónyay de Nagy-Lónya et Vásáros-Namény, a Hungarian nobleman of lower rank, of Protestant faith, and one year older than her. After studying law in Budapest, he had entered diplomatic service. In 1886, he was appointed counselor of the legation. He worked in Bucharest, then in Saint Petersburg and Brussels. In 1890, he became imperial and royal Chamberlain at the Austrian court. Promoted to embassy secretary in 1892, he worked in Saint Petersburg, Paris, London and Stuttgart. He then took advantage of a year's leave to travel to Africa and the Mediterranean countries. In 1895, he accompanied Archduke Louis Victor as a member of the imperial legation during the coronation of Tsar Nicolas II in Saint Petersburg. In 1896 he and his brother Gábor were raised to the dignity of Count. In 1897, he resigned from the foreign service and retired from the public service. In order to be able to marry Stéphanie, he converted to Catholicism.

Stéphanie did not dare to forewarn her father of her marriage plans. She chose to address herself by letter, in October 1899, to Queen Victoria who supported her. However, the King of Belgium refused to see his daughter marry a man of lower rank. Stéphanie received a negative response from Leopold II: "My father answered me in the severest and harshest terms that he refused me his consent. Queen Victoria's letter had missed its mark. He gave her, too, an extremely lively answer, in which he even hinted that she had better not interfere in matters which did not concern her". The Belgian sovereigns, offended that Stéphanie did not primarily speak to them about her matrimonial projects, severed any relationship with their daughter and forbade her to return to Belgium. Leopold II even planned to withdraw the title of Royal Highness from his second daughter, but court jurists demonstrated the impossibility of this. The King forbade his youngest daughter Clémentine to correspond with Stéphanie and threatened to abolish the annual annuity of 50,000 francs which she received, although Franz Joseph I advised him against it.

On 22 March 1900 at Miramare Castle and after eleven years of widowhood, Stéphanie married Count Elemér Lónyay de Nagy-Lónya and Vásáros-Namény. The Emperor reluctantly gave his authorization, but Stéphanie lost her rank and her imperial titles by remarrying, while her daughter Elisabeth Marie remained in Vienna in her grandfather's guardianship. The former Crown Princess's household was dissolved: all those who were part of it were dismissed, but some of them were assigned to her daughter's service. The patronages exerted by Stéphanie were withdrawn from her, and she thus received an annual pension of 100,000 guilders. Her new husband, for his part, had an annual income of 50,000 guilders.

The Austrian press, and in particular the journal Die Presse, saw in this marriage a "certain marvelous romanticism in the act which the princess poses [because] the latter closed on her the portal of the Hofburg, at the same time thoughtful and the glance full of promising images, then went south where she will soon cease to be Princess Dowager". The new spouses initially settled at the Palais Zichy in Vienna.

==== Family affairs ====
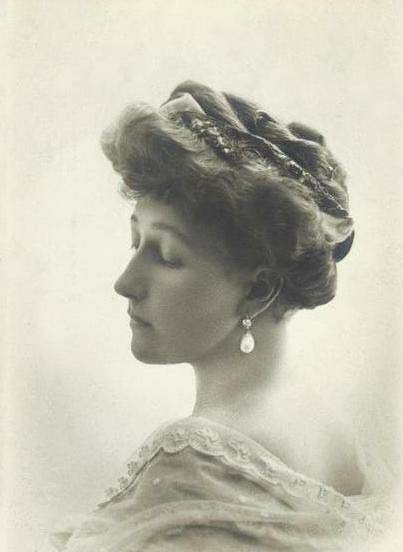
Princess Stéphanie of Belgium, Countess Lónyay. Photography by Lallie Charles, 1911.

Two years after her mother's remarriage, Archduchess Elisabeth Marie (who at some point was considered as a potential bride for several princes in Europe, among them her cousin Prince Albert, heir presumptive to the throne of Belgium, and the German Crown Prince) married on 23 January 1902 Prince Otto Weriand of Windisch-Graetz, an Austrian prince born in a former Sovereign family (until the German mediatisation) and officer, despite the objections of her grandfather Emperor Franz Joseph I, who later gave his consent. A few months later, in September, while staying in London, Stéphanie learned of the death of her mother, Queen Marie Henriette, who was living withdrawn from the Belgian court. Immediately, she left for Spa to pay a last tribute to her mother. However, King Leopold II was still so furious with his daughter's unequal marriage that he forbade Stéphanie to attend the funeral service, and she was finally forced a few days later to return to London.

When King Leopold II himself died on 17 December 1909, Stéphanie had just, two days earlier, been refused a final meeting with the monarch. Her sister Louise returned to Belgium as well, and the dying sovereign also refused to see her. Stéphanie and her sisters discovered that their father had left as main beneficiary of his will his chief mistress, the French prostitute Caroline Lacroix, as well as the Royal Trust. He also deliberately concealed property included in his estate in shell companies in Germany and France, not only to deprive his daughters of it, but also to allow his town-planning projects to continue. The Belgian state offered a financial transaction to the three princesses, who would each receive a sum of two million francs. While Stéphanie and Clémentine accepted the proposal, Louise refused it and initiated, in December 1910, a first trial against the Belgian State and her two sisters. In April 1911, Louise initiated a second lawsuit concerning the French companies created by Leopold II. In 1912, Louise and Stéphanie, who had now become her ally, were defended by Henri Jaspar and Paul-Émile Janson, and Louise persevered in her legal actions. The two princesses refused a new amicable agreement with the State, before their action was dismissed by the Court of Appeal in April 1913. However, on 22 January 1914, an agreement was concluded between Louise, the Belgian State and some of her creditors: She received, like her two sisters, a little more than five million francs from their late father's fortune.

==== Peaceful life in Hungary ====
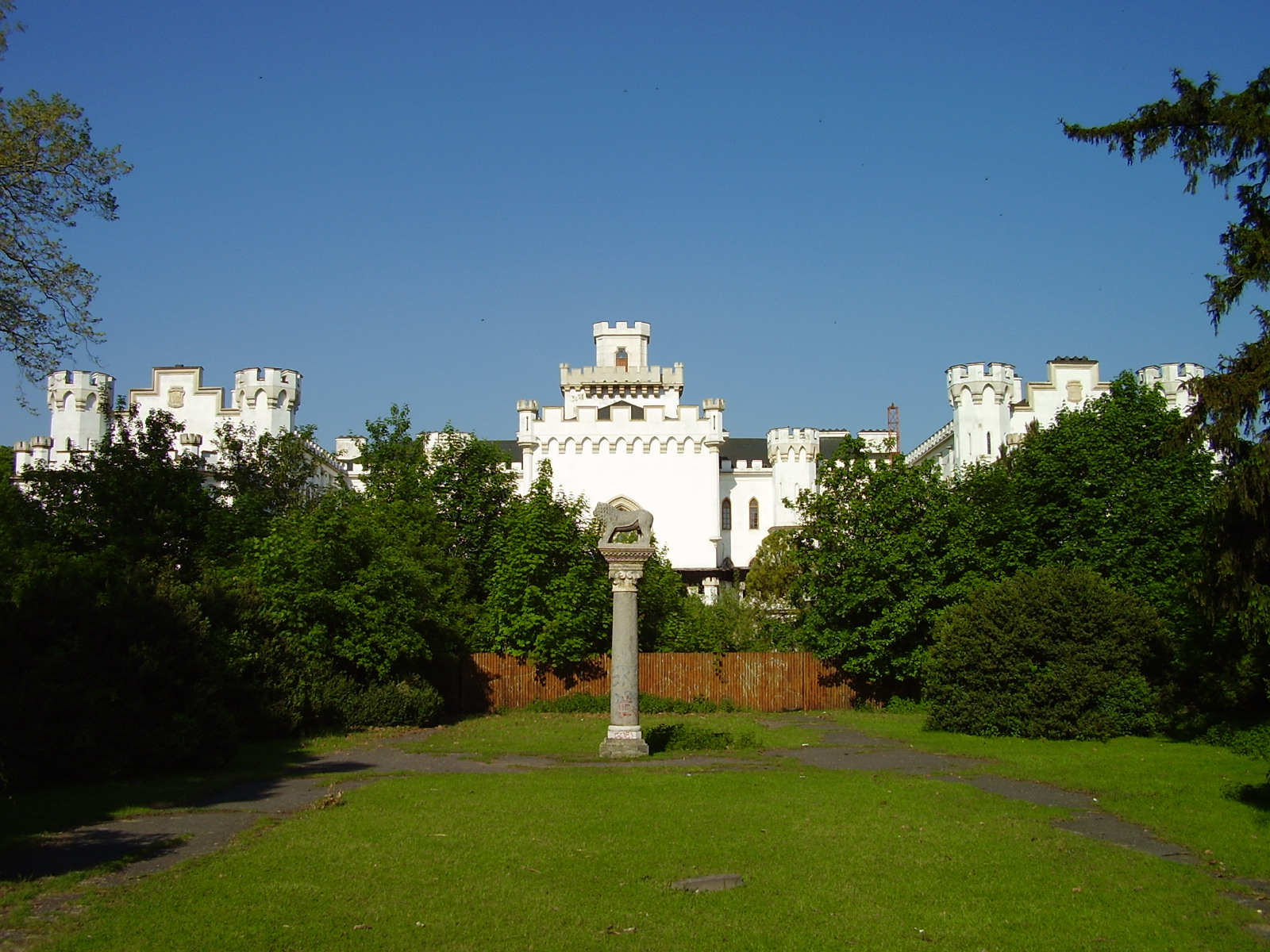
Rusovce Mansion.

In January 1906, Stéphanie and Elemér bought the Rusovce Mansion in Hungary (now in Slovakia) in order to establish permanent residence there. The neoclassical-style building is located in an area of over 2,400 hectares, consisting of an English-style park, planted with purple beeches, silver fir trees and multiple decorative species, which extends over both banks of the Danube. They received many guests there, including Archduke Franz Ferdinand and his morganatic wife, still ostracized by the court of Vienna, and writers, such as the pacifist Bertha von Suttner. Renovation was required for the residence, which comprised 200 rooms. Elemér exhibited his artistic collections there, including antique furniture, paintings by old and modern masters, as well as precious porcelain. Stéphanie and her husband created three gardens: a rose garden, an alpine garden, and another of Dutch inspiration. Irmgard Schiel wrote, "The princess was at the same time a lord, mistress of the house, manager of the estate, garden architect and hostess".

==== World War I ====
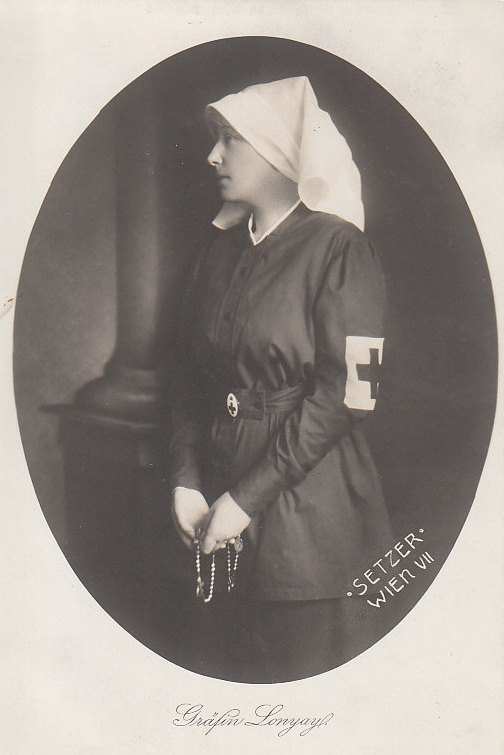
Princess Stéphanie as a nurse, ca. 1914.

When Stéphanie learned of the assassination of Archduke Franz Ferdinand and his wife in Sarajevo on 28 June 1914, she was convinced that the death of the heir presumptive to the Austro-Hungarian throne was desired by Emperor Franz Joseph I because the deceased had dared to stand up to him. Stéphanie claimed to have warned the victims because the Emperor knew the danger that his nephew was running. Four weeks later, war broke out. With Hungary not yet undergoing many hardships, Stéphanie set up a makeshift dispensary in the Rusovce house, while Elemér accepted a management position in the Austrian Red Cross which took him to Romania and Serbia. Stéphanie worked as a nurse in her residence.

In November 1916, the health of Emperor Franz Joseph I was declining, and his family came to see him. Stéphanie left Hungary for Vienna, where the Emperor died of bronchitis and pneumonia at the age of 86 on 21 November 1916 after a reign of 68 years. Stéphanie and her daughter Elisabeth Marie attended the funeral, which took place nine days later. On this occasion, the Habsburg monarchy unfolded its full splendor for the last time. The new Emperor Charles I led the funeral procession, which included representatives of the Allied Powers, all German princes, and the members of the House of Habsburg. In the choir of St. Stephen's Cathedral, the new Emperor and his wife Empress Zita took a prominent place alongside the foreign rulers, and behind them stood their close family relatives. Stéphanie and her daughter were placed in the third row. Finally, the remains of Franz Joseph I were placed next to his wife and son in the Imperial Crypt in the center of Vienna.

The new emperor on 28 January 1917 granted the title of Hungarian Fürst (Prince) with the style of Serene Highness to Elemér. After the armistice of 11 November 1918, the Austro-Hungarian Empire ceased to exist. In March 1919, the whole imperial family had to leave Austria. However this measure did not apply to Stéphanie nor her daughter, who were excluded from the House of Habsburg following their marriages.

==== Between wars ====
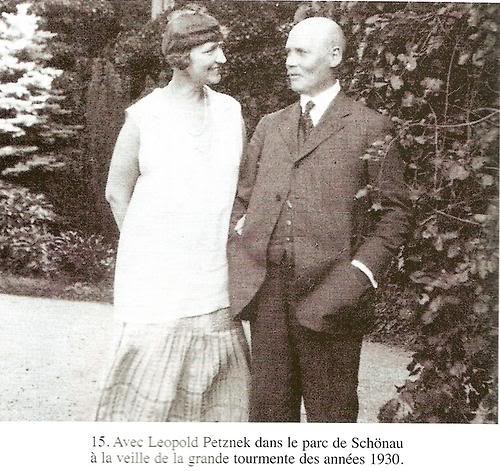
Archduchess Elisabeth Marie and her longtime companion Leopold Petznek, ca. 1930.

Until World War II, Prince and Princess Lónyay peacefully spent their lives at Rusovce. In the years following the end of the World War I, Elisabeth Marie (who resided with her family in Schönau an der Triesting, Lower Austria) and her mother still had strong feelings for each other. This tenderness was expressed especially in their correspondence because it was difficult to travel to Rusovce. However, in 1922, Stéphanie was delighted to receive her two eldest grandsons, Franz Joseph and Ernst Weriand of Windisch-Graetz. The teenagers, however, were eager to return to their home because their grandmother's attitudes were very different from what they were used to. Stéphanie's last letter to her daughter dated from 1924, the year in which Erzsi had just obtained a divorce a mensa et thoro from her husband. The following year, Elisabeth Marie participated in her mother's silver wedding anniversary. Thereafter, mother and daughter did not see each other at all. According to her granddaughter-in-law, author Ghislaine of Windisch-Graetz (née d'Arschot Schoonhoven), Stéphanie "was confused in devotion and even bigoted; she was convinced that her daughter was possessed by the demon and she could not tolerate the immorality of her love life. As the reprobation seemed insufficient to her, she preferred to stay away, pray for her daughter and ask priests to join their prayers to hers.

In 1923, Stéphanie planned to write her memoirs. To do this, she chose to collaborate with Egon Corti, a biographer recognized in particular for his work on the historical figures of the House of Habsburg. The writer stayed in Rusovce eleven times. The collaboration was, however, abruptly interrupted in 1933 by Stéphanie, who wrote to Corti: "For the sake of the imperial family, I decided to give up publishing my memoirs in the form that had been initially planned [...]. I see myself constrained to limit myself to my own notes, as well as to my personal memories, in which your contributions and your modifications do not find their place". Corti being excluded from the literary project, Stéphanie addressed Count and Countess Gatterburg, who submitted the manuscript first to a publisher in Leipzig in 1933. The latter considered that the manuscript was not complete enough and that its publication would be detrimental to the author. Another publishing house, John Murray of London, also rejected the text received. Finally, the Koehler & Amelang house in Leipzig agreed to publish the book and have it published simultaneously in Europe and New York. The publishing contract was drawn up on 24 April 1934, but Stéphanie's procrastination postponed the publication and distribution of her memoirs to October 1935, under the original title of Ich sollte Kaiserin werden (I Was To Be Empress) in German bookstores, because the book was censored in Austria, where the police visited every bookshop in Vienna in order to seize the copies already on sale. In the book she published Rudolf's last letter to her, and proclaimed that (in her view) he and Baroness Vetsera had made a suicide pact. The work appeared in a French version in 1937 in Brussels under the title: Je devais être impératrice (I Had To Be Empress), and the same year was finally authorized to be published in Austria under the original title.

=== Last years and death ===
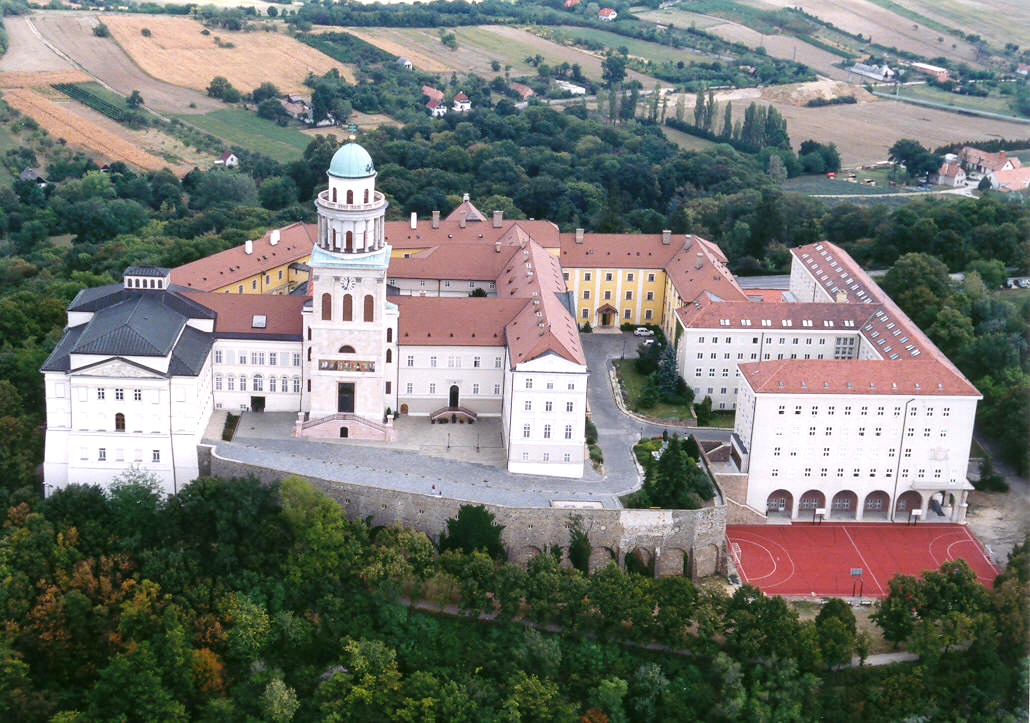
Pannonhalma Archabbey.

As long as they maintained satisfactory health, Stéphanie and Elemér traveled and met various exiled rulers: the deposed Tsar Ferdinand I of Bulgaria and the Empress Zita. They met the latter in Spain, and then in Belgium where Ferdinand had been exiled since 1930. Gradually, they withdrew to their estate where they led a more secluded existence, punctuated by religious exercises. Among their closest acquaintances figured, from 1944, their chaplain, Geza Karsai, Germanist, university professor and monk of the Pannonhalma Archabbey.

In July 1944, Stéphanie drew up her will. She disinherited her daughter, who had divorced Prince Otto of Windisch-Graetz to live with Leopold Petznek, a Social Democratic deputy from Lower Austria, and bequeathed all of her real estate to the order of the Benedictines. In return, the Benedictines were responsible for meeting all the debts of the Lónyays and managing their estates. The year 1944 brought new worries to Stéphanie and her husband because the German Army wanted to transform their residence into a military hospital for war wounded, a project which was rejected at the last minute. On the other hand, in the autumn, Edmund Veesenmayer, SS Brigadeführer, and commander of the city of Budapest, took up quarters in Rusovce accompanied by a large staff. Veesenmayer began to search all the archives in the house and confiscated documents of a historical nature, such as letters from Crown Prince Rudolf. Stéphanie and Elemér were forced to take refuge in a few rooms because the occupants had appropriated most of the castle. At the end of March 1945, the Germans, realizing that their position was threatened by the advancing Red Army, traveled further west.

On 2 April 1945, it was the Red Army, having just launched a last offensive pushing back the Germans near Lake Balaton, which reached the Rusovce mansion. During the first weeks of the Soviet occupation, the Lónyays preferred to stay at home with a few servants. However, in May, Stéphanie (suffering from heart disease) and her husband left their residence to take refuge in the Pannonhalma Archabbey, protected by the International Committee of the Red Cross. Three months later, on 23 August 1945, Stephanie died there of a stroke, aged 81. Neither her daughter nor any of her descendants were present at her funeral. She was buried in the crypt of Pannonhalma Archabbey. Elemér survived her less than a year, dying on 29 July 1946, and was buried next to her.

== Aftermath ==
Stéphanie's only daughter, Archduchess Elisabeth Marie, finally obtained a divorce from her husband, Prince Otto Weriand of Windisch-Graetz in early 1948 and on 4 May of that year, she married her longtime partner Petznek in a registry office in Vienna. Estranged from her four children (of whom two died before her), after Leopold Petznek's death in 1956 from a heart attack, Elisabeth Marie (who used a wheelchair due to gout) became reclusive until her death on 16 March 1963 at the Windisch-Graetz Villa in Hütteldorf, Vienna and was buried in an unmarked tomb (only recognized by the burial codification group 2, number G72) at the Hütteldorfer cemetery next to her husband; near her were buried her two sons who predeceased her, Rudolf and Ernst. Like her mother before her, she also disinherited her two surviving children: she left some 500 heirlooms, owned by the Habsburg Imperial family and inherited by her, to the Republic of Austria, and the extensive park of her Windisch-Graetz villa, in a prime Viennese residential area, was willed to the city of Vienna for the construction of a new residential complex.

From her first marriage, Elisabeth Marie had had four children:

- Prince Franz Joseph of Windisch-Graetz (German: Franz Josef Marie Otto Antonius Ignatius Oktavianus; born Prague 22 March 1904 – died Nairobi 1 January 1981), married in Brussels on 3 January 1934 with Countess Ghislaine d'Arschot Schoonhoven (who wrote a biography of her mother-in-law named L'archiduchesse rouge: La vie d'Élisabeth-Marie, orpheline de Mayerling [The Red Archduchess: The Life of Elisabeth-Marie, Orphan of Mayerling] in which her grandmother-in-law Stéphanie is often mentioned). They had two children.
- Prince Ernst of Windisch-Graetz (German: Ernst Weriand Maria Otto Antonius Expeditus Anselmus; born Prague 21 April 1905 – died Vienna 21 December 1952), married firstly in Vienna on 17 October 1927 (divorced 1938, annulled 1940) Ellen (Helena) Skinner, and secondly in Schwarzenbach an der Pielach, Lower Austria, on 11 May 1947 Baroness Eva von Isbary. With issue in both marriages.
- Prince Rudolph of Windisch-Graetz (German: Rudolf Johann Maria Otto Joseph Anton Andreas; born Ploskovice 4 February 1907 – died Vienna 14 June 1930).
- Princess Stephanie of Windisch-Graetz (German: Stephanie Eleonore Maria Elisabeth Kamilla Philomena Veronika; born Ploskovice 9 July 1909 – died at Uccle 7 September 2005), married firstly in Brussels on 22 July 1933 Count Pierre d'Alcantara di Querrieu, and secondly in Brussels on 14 November 1945 Carl Axel Björklund. With issue in both marriages.

As of 2021, Stéphanie had eight great-grandchildren, 24 great-great-grandchildren and 32 great-great-great-grandchildren.

== Invention ==
As the New York Times noted, Stéphanie "invented a new chafing dish and spirit lamp combined, and [took] out patents in England, France, Germany, Italy, and Belgium". Her 1908 decision to take out a US patent on a chafing dish surprised the New York Times, not because of her lineage but because "throughout Europe the proficiency of Columbia’s daughters with the chafing dish is traditional…".

== Titles and heraldry ==
=== Titles ===
At her birth, as the daughter of King Leopold II, Stéphanie was titled Princess of Saxe-Coburg and Gotha and Duchess in Saxony, with the predicate of Royal Highness, according to the titles of her house, and bears the unofficial title of Princess of Belgium, which will be officially regularized by Royal Decree dated 14 March 1891.

- 21 May 1864 – 10 May 1881: Her Royal Highness Princess Stéphanie of Saxe-Coburg and Gotha, Duchess in Saxony
- 10 May 1881 – 30 January 1889: Her Imperial and Royal Highness the Crown Princess of Austria, Hungary, Bohemia and Croatia
- 30 January 1889 – 22 March 1900: Her Imperial and Royal Highness the Dowager Crown Princess of Austria, Hungary, Bohemia and Croatia
- 22 March 1900 – 28 January 1917: Her Royal Highness Princess Stéphanie, Countess Elemér Lónyay de Nagy-Lónya
- 28 January 1917 – 23 August 1945: Her Royal Highness Princess Elemér Lónyay de Nagy-Lónya.

=== Heraldry ===
Coat of Arms of Stéphanie as Princess of Belgium	Imperial Monogram of Stéphanie as Crown Princess of Austria

== Posterity and honors ==
=== Toponymy ===
- In Brussels, the Place Stéphanie/Stefaniaplein, created in 1840 and connecting the Place Louise/Louizaplein to the Bois de la Cambre/Ter Kamerenbos, bears the name of the Princess from 1875.
- In Brussels, the Stéphanie Tunnel is a road tunnel of 465 mt. long, connecting the Place Poelaert/Poelaertplein to the Avenue Louise, construction of which was completed in 1957.
- The steamboat Archiduchesse Stéphanie, built in 1890 by the Cockerill shipyards in Hoboken, was intended the following year for the service of the Haut-Congo flotilla.
- The Lake Chew Bahir, also known as Lake Stéphanie, located in Ethiopia and discovered by the Austro-Hungarian explorers Sámuel Teleki and Ludwig von Höhnel in 1887–1888, was named in honor of the princess.
- In Croatia, in the Plitvice Lakes National Park, Lake Kozjak has an ovoid islet of 1.4 hectares, called "Stephanie's islet" in memory of the princess, who visited the site shortly before 1900.

=== Astronomy ===
- 220 Stephania is an asteroid in the main belt, discovered shortly after the marriage of the princess (19 May 1881) by Austrian astronomer Johann Palisa, who named it in her honor.

=== Ornithology ===
- The Stephanie's astrapia is a species of passerine birds of the family of Paradisaeidae, named in honor of the princess in 1884.

=== Painting ===
Stéphanie has been represented by several painters:

- 1880: Full-length portrait by Hans Makart.
- 1881: Allegory of the union of Rudolf and Stéphanie by Sophia and Maria Görlich.
- 1882: Bust portrait by Heinrich von Angeli.
- 1883: Bust portrait by Hedwig Höna-Senft.
- ca. 1884: Full-length portrait by Hans Canon.
- ca. 1900: Full-length portrait by József Árpád Koppay.
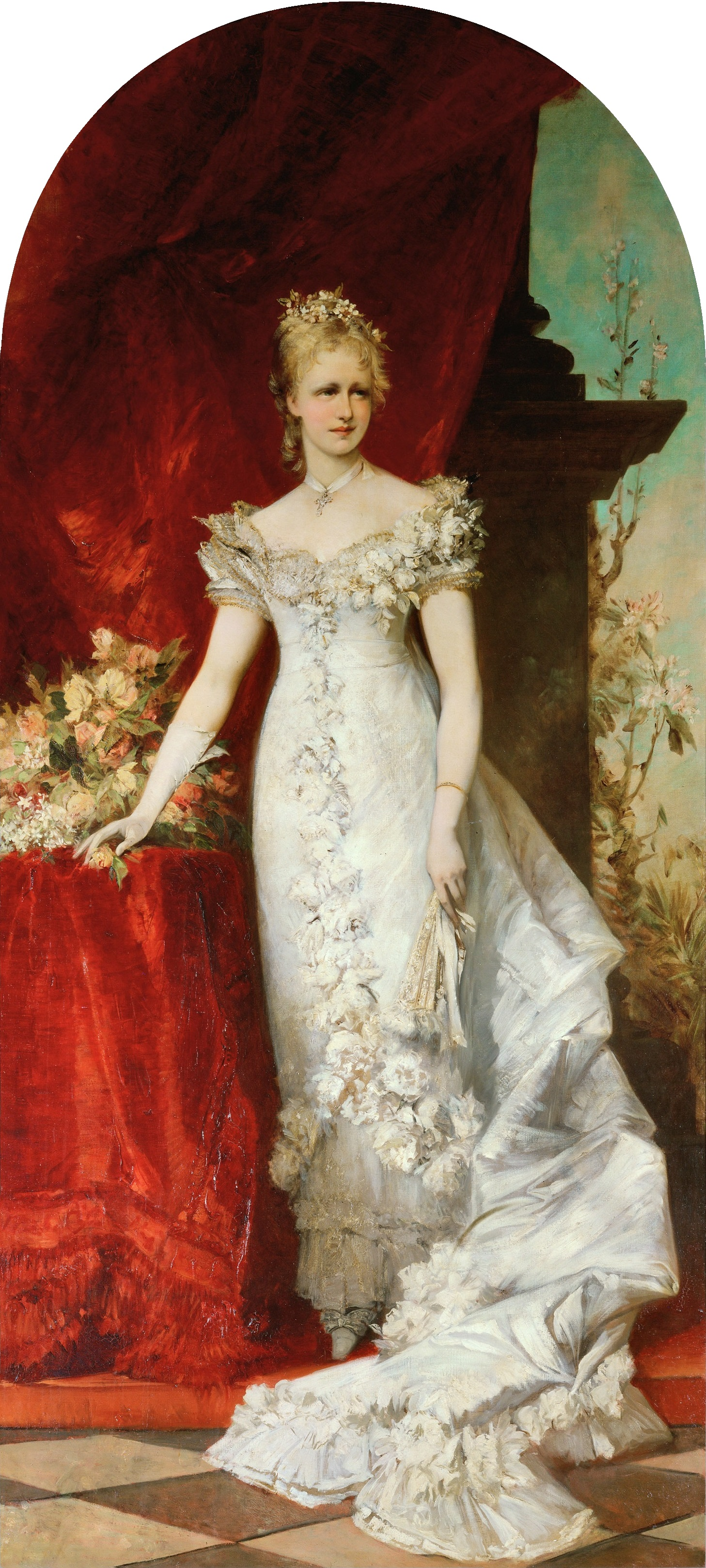
Princess Stéphanie of Belgium, by Hans Makart (1880). Kunsthistorisches Museum, Vienna.

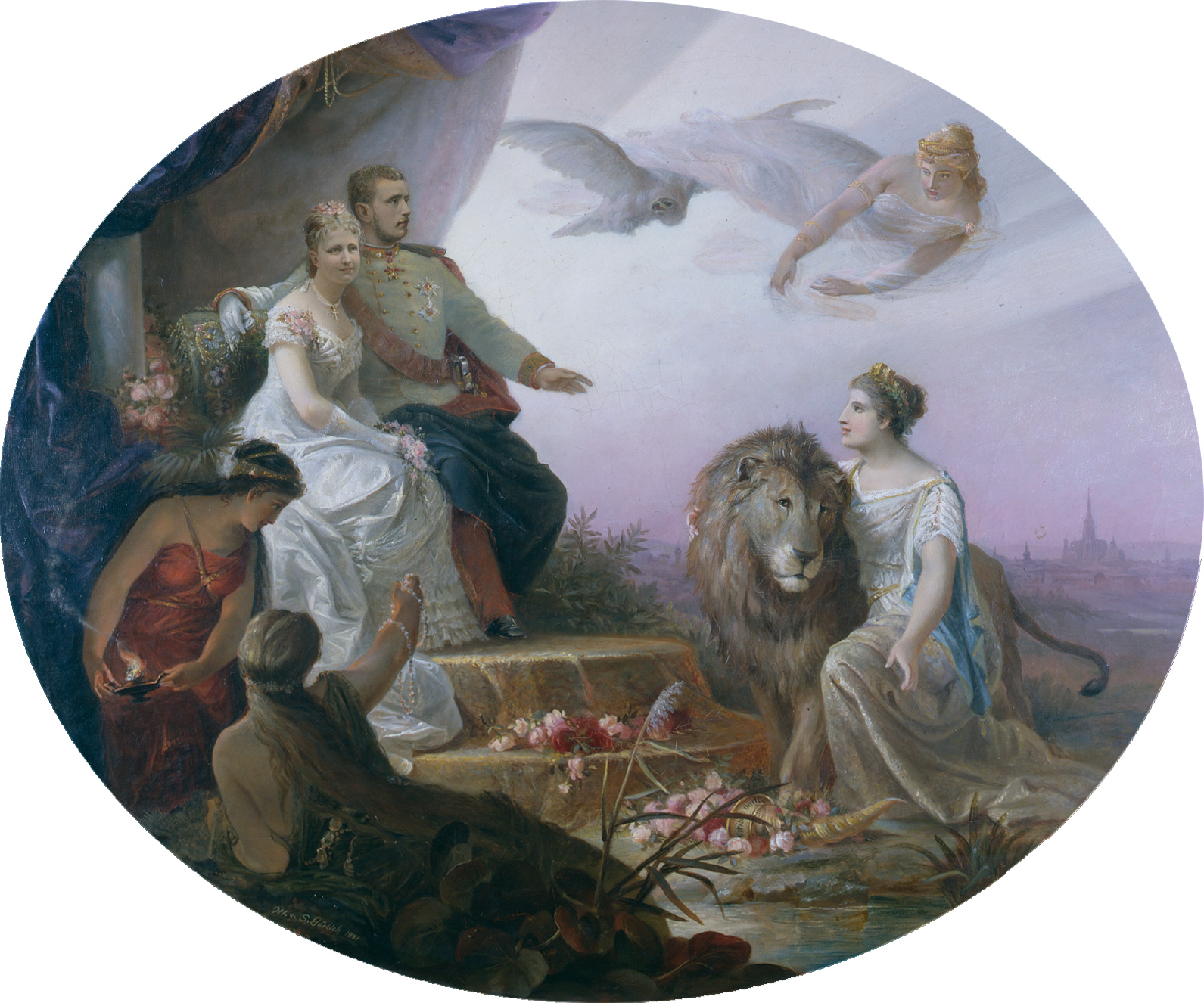
Allegory on the betrothal of Crown Prince Rudolf and Stéphanie of Belgium, by Sophia and Maria Görlich (1881). Hofmobiliendepot, Vienna.

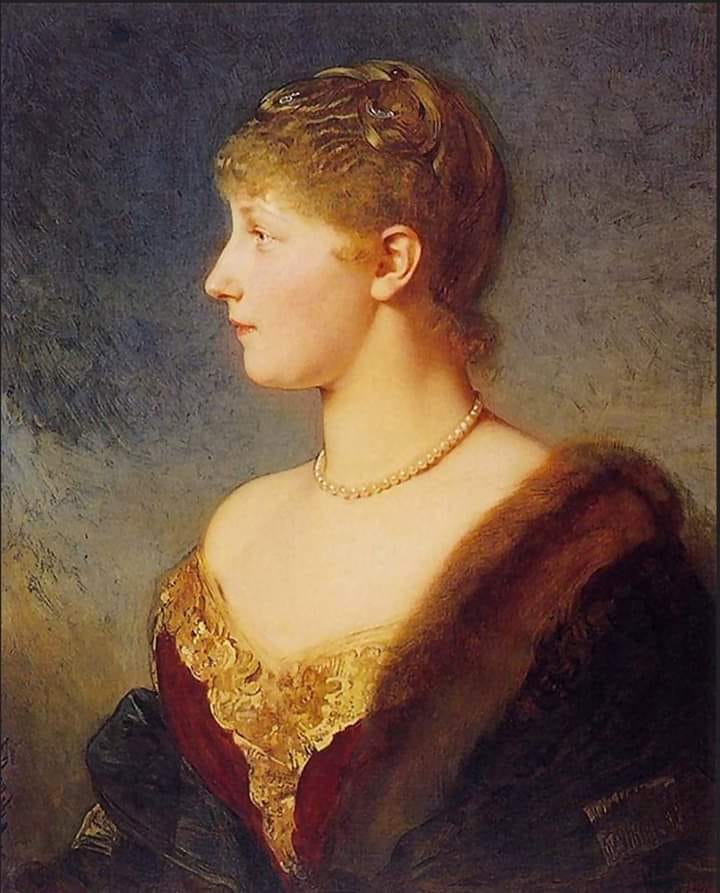
Stéphanie, Crown Princess of Austria-Hungary, by Heinrich von Angeli (1882). Hofmobiliendepot, Vienna.

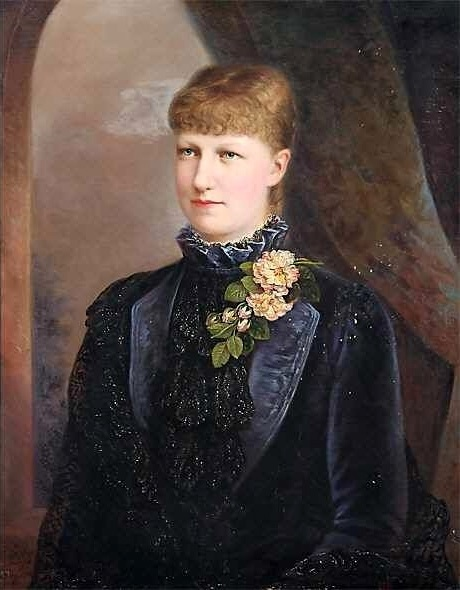
Crown Princess Stéphanie of Austria, by Hedwig Höna-Senft (1883).

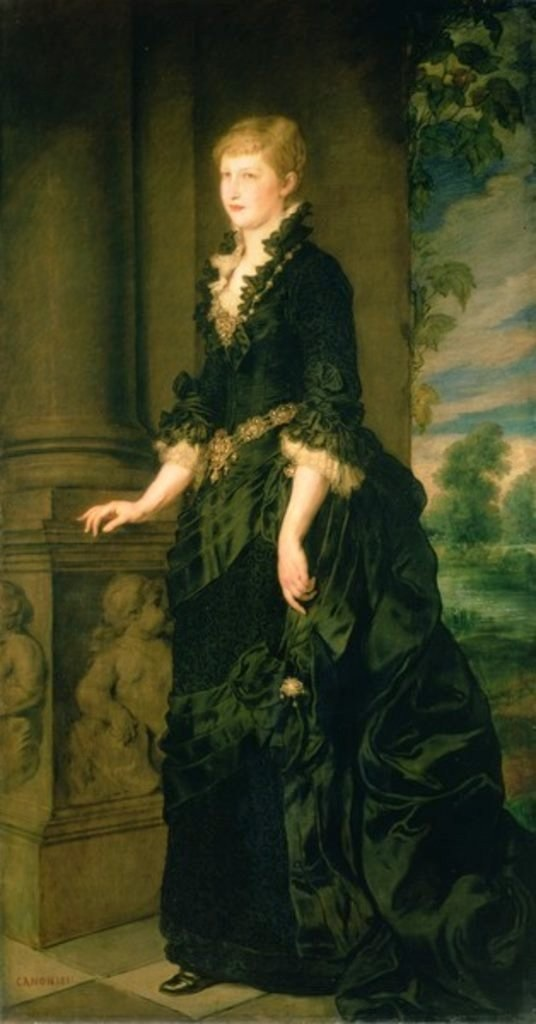
Crown Princess Stéphanie, consort to Crown Prince Rudolf of Austria, by Hans Canon (c. 1884).

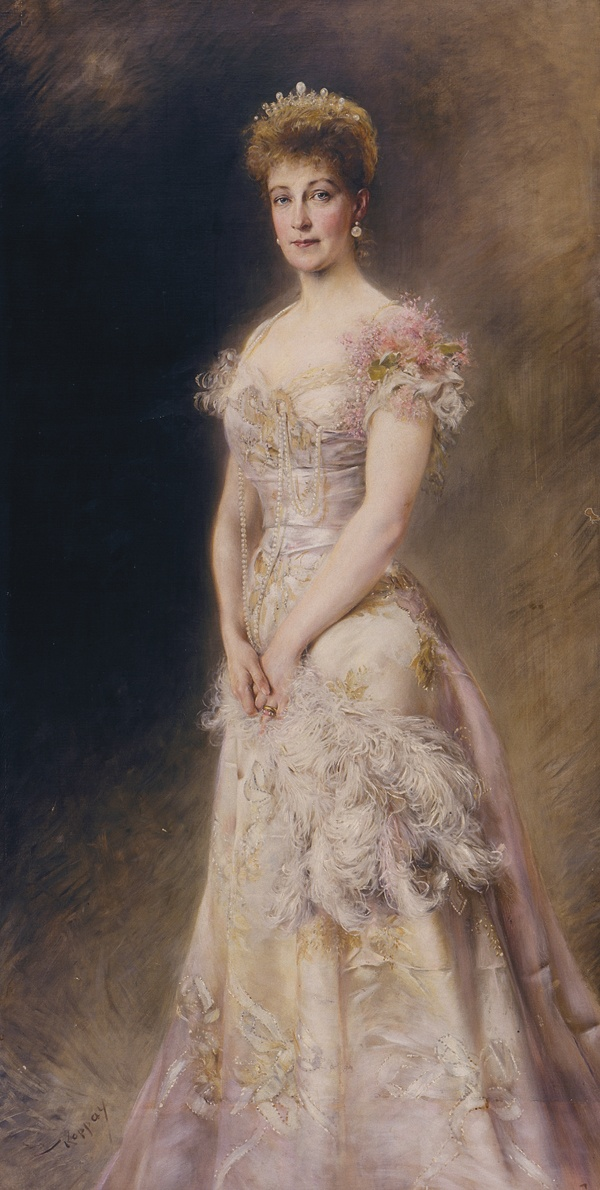
Stéphanie, Princess Elemér Lónyay de Nagy-Lónya, by József Árpád Koppay (c. 1900). Pannonhalma Archabbey.

=== Screen and stage ===
- Mayerling, French film by Anatole Litvak (1936), with Yolande Laffon as Stéphanie.
- The Secret of Mayerling, a French film by Jean Delannoy (1949), with Silvia Monfort playing the role of Stéphanie.
- Mayerling, Franco-British film by Terence Young (1968), with Andrea Parisy as Stéphanie.
- In the British television series Fall of Eagles (1974), Stéphanie is portrayed by Susan Tracy in the episode "Requiem for a Crown Prince".
- Kenneth MacMillan's 1978 ballet, Mayerling - Portrayed by Wendy Ellis.
- Kronprinz Rudolf, Austro-Franco-German-Italian TV movie by Robert Dornhelm (2006) in two parts, with Daniela Golpashin in the role of Stéphanie.
- Frank Wildhorn's 2008 Musical, Rudolf The Mayerling Affair - Portrayed by Wietske Van Tongeren.
- Rudolf: A Play in Two Acts by David Logan, 2011 Crown Princess Stephanie is a major role.

=== Phaleristics ===
- Austria-Hungary
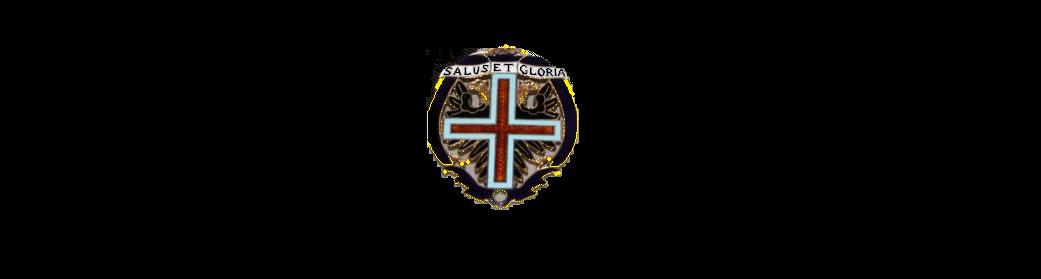
  - Dame of the Order of the Starry Cross, 1880
  - Grand Cross of the Imperial Austrian Order of Elizabeth, 1898
- Persia
  - Imperial Order of the Sun for Ladies, 2nd Class
- Portugal
  - Dame of the Order of Queen Saint Isabel, 21 April 1881
- Spain
  - Dame of the Order of Queen Maria Luisa, 16 May 1881
- Russian Empire
  - Grand Cross of the Imperial Order of Saint Catherine, 1897
- Saxony
  - Dame of the Order of Sidonia
- Sovereign Military Order of Malta
  - Dame Grand Cross of Honour and Devotion

== Ancestry ==
Ancestors of Princess Stéphanie of Belgium

8. Francis, Duke of Saxe-Coburg-Saalfeld
4. Leopold I of Belgium
9. Countess Augusta Reuss of Ebersdorf
2. Leopold II of Belgium
10. Louis Philippe I of France
5. Princess Louise of Orléans
11. Princess Maria Amalia of Naples and Sicily
1. Princess Stéphanie of Belgium
12. Leopold II, Holy Roman Emperor
6. Archduke Joseph, Palatine of Hungary
13. Infanta Maria Louisa of Spain
3. Archduchess Marie Henriette of Austria
14. Duke Louis of Württemberg
7. Duchess Maria Dorothea of Württemberg
15. Princess Henriette of Nassau-Weilburg

== See also ==
- House of Saxe-Coburg and Gotha
- Belgium
- Lake Stefanie
- Astrapia

== Bibliography ==
- de Belgique, Louise (1921). Autour des trônes que j'ai vu tomber (in French). Paris: Albin Michel. ISBN 978-2-87106-192-2.
- de Belgique, Stéphanie (2003). Je devais être impératrice: Mémoires des filles de Léopold II (in French). Brussels: Le Cri – Preface by Georges-Henri Dumont. ISBN 978-2-87106-324-7.
- de Windisch-Graetz, Ghislaine (1990). L'archiduchesse rouge: La vie d'Élisabeth-Marie, orpheline de Mayerling 1883-1963 (in French). Paris: Duculot. ISBN 978-2-8011-0881-9.
- Defrance, Olivier (2001). Louise de Saxe-Cobourg: Amours, argent, procès (in French). Brussels: Racine. ISBN 978-2-87386-230-5.
- de Golesco, Hélène; de Weisme, Augustine (1944). Marie-Henriette, reine des Belges (in French). Brussels: La Renaissance du livre.
- Enache, Nicolas (1999). La descendance de Marie-Thérèse de Habsburg (in French). Paris: Éditions L'intermédiaire des chercheurs et curieux. ISBN 978-2-908003-04-8.
- Kerckvoorde, Mia (2001). Marie-Henriette: une amazone face à un géant (in French). Translated by Marie Hooghe. Brussels: Racine. ISBN 2-87386-261-0.
- Schiel, Irmgard (1980). Stéphanie princesse héritière dans l'ombre de Mayerling (in French). Translated by Dominique Mols. Gembloux: Duculot. ISBN 978-3-421-01867-0.
