= Dénes Pázmándy (1781–1854) =

Hungarian politician (1781–1854)

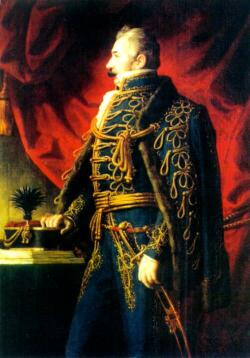
- Born: 10 March 1781; Kömlőd, Kingdom of Hungary
- Died: 1 February 1854 (aged 72); Baracska, Kingdom of Hungary
- Children: Dénes Pázmándy, Jr.

Dénes Pázmándy de Szomor et Somodor (10 March 1781 – 1 February 1854) was a Hungarian landowner and politician, who was a member of the National Defence Committee during the Hungarian Revolution of 1848. He served as Count (comes) of Fejér County in 1848. He surrendered before Field Marshal Windisch-Grätz in January 1849.

He was the father of Dénes Pázmándy, Jr.
