= Kömlőd =

Coordinates: 47°32′48.41″N 18°15′37.73″E

- Location of Komárom-Esztergom county in Hungary
- Country: Hungary
- County: Komárom-Esztergom

Area
  - Total: 22.83 km^{2} (8.81 sq mi)

Population (2004)
  - Total: 1,205
  - Density: 52.78/km^{2} (136.7/sq mi)
- Time zone: UTC+1 (CET)
  - Summer (DST): UTC+2 (CEST)
- Postal code: 2853
- Area code: 34

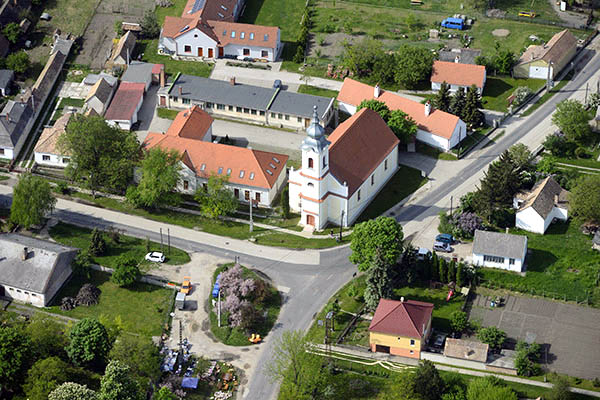
Kömlőd légi fotó

Kömlőd is a village in Komárom-Esztergom county, Hungary. It was the birthplace of politicians Dénes Pázmándy and his son, also named Dénes.
