= Dénes Pázmándy (1816–1856) =

Hungarian landowner and politician

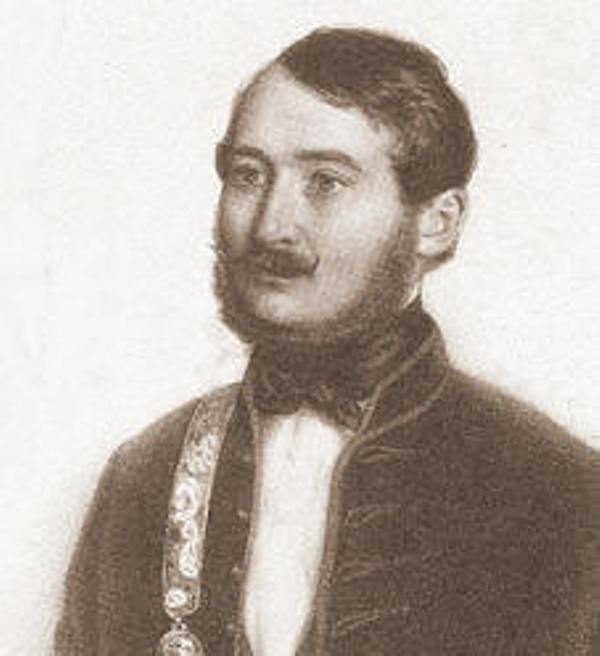

Speaker of the House of Representatives
- In office 10 July 1848 – 9 January 1849
- Preceded by: office established
- Succeeded by: Pál Almásy

Personal details
- Born: 7 April 1816 Kömlőd, Kingdom of Hungary
- Died: 24 January 1856 (aged 39) Baracska, Kingdom of Hungary
- Party: Opposition Party
- Profession: politician

Dénes Pázmándy de Szomor et Somodor (7 April 1816 – 24 January 1856) was a Hungarian landowner and politician, who served as Speaker of the House of Representatives between 1848 and 1849.

== Biography ==
He was born into an old, noble family in Kömlőd, Komárom County on 7 April 1816. His parents were Dénes Pázmándy who was a member of the National Defence Committee during the Hungarian Revolution of 1848 and Judit Pély Nagy. He studied law in Pozsony and Pest. He joined reform movement in the 1830s. During National Assembly of 1832–1836 he served as juratus along with Bertalan Szemere, Ferenc Pulszky and Sebő Vukovics. He participated in the writing of Törvényhatósági Tudósítások which was authentically reported on the functioning of legislation which guided by Lajos Kossuth. He published several articles under pseudonym for the Pesti Hírlap which supported the reforms.

From 1839 he served as deputy notary of Komárom County later became first deputy notary, second vicecomes, vicecomes. Since 1843 he was one of the leaders of the moderate liberal opposition. He became representative of Nagyigmánd in 1848. The Batthyány cabinet sent him along with László Szalay to Frankfurt to negotiate the German parliament in May. He became speaker of the lower house on 10 July.

He unsuccessfully discussed with Imperial Court of Vienna in September in Schönbrunn Palace. He did not follow the Hungarian government to Debrecen after occupation of Buda, he surrendered before Field Marshal Windisch-Grätz in January 1849. As a result, the House of Representatives deprived of his mandate in March. He was arrested by Richard Guyon in April. Kossuth ordered an investigation against him but soon he was released on the intercession of Sebő Vukovics. After the revolution was crushed he retired to his estate. Pázmándy died in 1856 following a long illness.

Political offices
Preceded by office created	Speaker of the House of Representatives; 1848–1849	Succeeded by Pál Almásy
