= Israeli pavilion =

Venice Biennale national pavilion

The Israeli pavilion houses Israel's national representation during the Venice Biennale arts festivals. Jewish Israeli artists first participated in the 24th Venice Biennale in the Erez Israel, Artisti Palestinesi pavilion. Israel first participated in the 25th Venice Biennale in 1950.

== Background ==
The Venice Biennale is an international art biennial exhibition held in Venice, Italy. Often described as "the Olympics of the art world", participation in the Biennale is a prestigious event for contemporary artists. The festival has become a constellation of shows: a central exhibition curated by that year's artistic director, national pavilions hosted by individual nations, and independent exhibitions held throughout Venice. The Biennale's parent organisation also runs regular festivals in other arts: architecture, dance, film, music and theatre.

Outside the central international exhibition, individual nations produce their own shows, known as pavilions, as their national representation. Nations that own their pavilion buildings – such as the 30 housed in the Giardini – are responsible for their own upkeep and construction costs as well. Nations without dedicated buildings create pavilions in venues throughout the city.

== Organization and building ==
In 1948 Israeli Jewish painters participated under the Erez Israel, Artisti Palestinesi pavilion sponsored by wealthy Italian Jews. In 1950, Israeli opened its pavilion. The pavilion, designed by Zeev Rechter, was built between 1951 and 1952 and later restored by Fredrik Fogh in 1966.

== Representation by year ==
=== Art ===
- 1948 — Yitzhak Frenkel Frenel, Yehezkel Streichman, Moshe Castel, Sionah Tagger, Avigdor Stematsky, Aharon Giladi
- 1950 — Yitzhak Frenkel Frenel, Mordechai Levanon, Leon Fein, Leo Kahn
- 1952 — Marcel Janco, Reuben Rubin, Moshe Mokady
- 1982 — Tamar Getter, Michal Na'aman
- 1986 — Nubani Ibrahim, Asad azi
- 1988 — Zadok Ben-David
- 1990 — Ya'acov Dorchin
- 1993 — Avital Geva
- 1995 — Joshua Neustein, Uri Tzaig (Curator: Gideon Ofrat)
- 1997 — Yossi Berger, Miriam Cabessa, Sigalit Landau
- 2001 — Uri Katzenstein (Curator: Yigal Zalmona)
- 2003 — Michal Rovner
- 2005 — Guy Ben-Ner (Curator: Sergio Edelzstein)
- 2007 — Yehudit Sasportas (Curator: Suzanne Landau)
- 2009 — Raffi Lavie (Curator: Doreet LeVitte Harten)
- 2011 — Sigalit Landau (Curators: Jean de Loisy, Ilan Wizga)
- 2013 — Gilad Ratman (Curator: Sergio Edelstein)
- 2015 — Tsibi Geva (Curator: Hadas Maor)
- 2017 — Gal Weinstein (Curator: Tami Katz-Freiman)
- 2019 — Aya Ben Ron (Curator: Avi Lubin)
- 2024 – Ruth Patir (Curators: Mira Lapidot, Tamar Margalit)

== Bibliography ==
- Russeth, Andrew (April 17, 2019). "The Venice Biennale: Everything You Could Ever Want to Know". ARTnews.
- Volpi, Cristiana (2013). "Israel". In Re Rebaudengo, Adele (ed.). Pavilions and Garden of Venice Biennale. Rome: Contrasto. p. 184. ISBN 978-88-6965-440-4.
