= Gyal =

Gyal may refer to:

- Gyál, Hungary
- Gal, Azerbaijan
- Gyal, Iran
