= Gal =

Gal or GAL may refer to:

== People ==
=== Surname ===
- Gál, a Hungarian surname
- Andreas Gal (born 1976), German programmer
- Dani Gal (born 1975), Israeli video artist
- Dean Gal (born 1995), Israeli footballer
- Edward Gal (born 1970), Dutch dressage rider
- Gedalia Gal (born 1933), Israeli farmer and former politician
- Igor Gal (born 1983), Croatian footballer
- Jenny Gal (born 1969), Dutch-Italian judoka
- Lidia Gal, Israel chess master
- Naomi Gal (born 1944), Israeli writer
- Nora Gal (1912–1991), Soviet translator and literary critic
- Riki Gal (born 1950), Israeli singer
- Reuven Gal (born 1942), Israeli psychologist
- Sandra Gal (born 1985), German LPGA golfer
- Șandor Gal (born 1955), Romanian former ice hockey player
- Sharon Gal (born 1974), Israeli journalist and politician
- Shmuel Gal (born 1940), Israeli mathematician and professor
- Susan Gal (born 1949), American academic
- Udi Gal (born 1979), Israeli Olympic sailor
- Uziel Gal (1923–2002), German-born Israeli gun designer
- Yehoshua Gal (born 1951), Israeli former footballer
- Yoram Gal (born 1952), Israeli playwright and actor
- Zehava Gal, Israeli operatic mezzo-soprano

=== Given name or nickname ===
- Gal I (Bishop of Clermont) (c. 489–c. 553), Christian saint
- Gal Alberman (born 1983), Israeli footballer
- Gal Arel (born 1989), Israeli footballer
- Gal Barel (born 1990), Israeli footballer
- Gal Cohen (born 1982), Israeli footballer
- Gal Cohen Groumi (born 2002), Israeli Olympic swimmer
- Gal Costa (1945–2022), Brazilian pop singer
- Gal Fridman (born 1975), windsurfer and first Israeli to win an Olympic gold medal
- Gal Gadot (born 1985), Israeli actress and model
- Gal Genish (born 1991), Israeli footballer
- Gal Hirsch (born 1964), Israeli general
- Gal Koren (born 1992), Slovenian hockey player
- Gal Mayo (born 1981), Israeli footballer
- Gal Mekel (born 1988), Israeli National Basketball Association player
- Gal Mesika (born 1988), Israeli American football and association football player
- Gal Nevo (born 1987), Israeli swimmer
- Gal Nir (born 1983), Israeli football goalkeeper
- Gal Sapir (born 1990), Israeli footballer
- Gal Sone (born 1985), Japanese competitive eater
- Gal Shish (born 1989), Israeli footballer
- Gal Uchovsky (born 1958), Israeli screenwriter and producer
- Gal Weinstein (born 1970), Israeli artist
- Gal Yekutiel (born 1981), Israeli judoka
- Gal Zukerman (born 2003), Israeli Olympic kite foiler

=== Pseudonym or nom de guerre ===
- GAL (cartoonist) (born 1940), Belgian cartoonist
- János Gálicz or "General Gal" (1890-1939), Austro-Hungarian brigade and division commander during the Spanish Civil War

== Places ==
- County Galway, Ireland, Chapman code GAL
- Gal, Azerbaijan, a village and municipality in Nakhchivan
- Gal, Iran, a village in East Azerbaijan Province, Iran
- Gali (town), in Abkhazia
- Hal, Azerbaijan, a village in Qubadli

== Politics and law ==
- GAL (paramilitary group), a 1980s Spanish anti-ETA group
- Global administrative law
- Great Autonomies and Freedom (Italian: Grandi Autonomie e Libertà), an Italian parliamentary group
- Guardian ad litem, a type of legal guardian in the United States
- Green-Alternative List, now Alliance 90/The Greens Hamburg, a German political party

== Science ==
- Gal (unit), a unit of acceleration
- Galactose, a sugar
- Galanin, a peptide encoded by the GAL gene
- Galeandra, an orchid genus
- Galectin, an enzyme
- Gallon, a unit of capacity or volume

== Technology ==
- .gal, a top-level Internet domain for Galicia, Spain
- Generic array logic
- Generalized Automation Language
- Global Address List in groupware

== Language ==
- Gal language
- Galoli language (ISO code)
- GAL (cuneiform), Sumerian cuneiform character

== Other uses ==
- Edward G. Pitka Sr. Airport (IATA code), airport in Galena, Alaska
- Epistle to the Galatians
- Gal (1969 album), by Gal Costa
- GAL (film), a 2006 Spanish film
- Gal-class submarine of the Israeli Navy
- General Aircraft Limited, a British aircraft manufacturer
- Global Aero Logistics, an American airline holding company
- Gyaru (ギャル), a Japanese fashion style for young women
- Kogal, a newer Japanese fashion style for young women, also sometimes referred to as "gal"
- Stadium Gal, a football stadium in Irun, Spain
- Slang term for a woman or girl

== See also ==
- Gals (disambiguation)
- Gally (disambiguation)
- Avigdor Ben-Gal (born 1936), Israeli former general
- Avner Ben-Gal (born 1966), Israeli painter and artist
