= Xoşkeşin =

- Municipality
- Location within Azerbaijan
- Coordinates: 39°10′07″N 45°41′43″E
- Country: Azerbaijan
- Autonomous republic: Nakhchivan
- District: Julfa

Population (2005)
  - Total: 383
- Time zone: UTC+4 (AZT)

Xoşkeşin (also, Xoşkeşiş, Khoshkeshin and Koshkesin) is a village and municipality in the Julfa District of Nakhchivan, Azerbaijan. It is located 34 km to the north of the district center, on the left bank of the Alinjachay River, on the slope of the Zangezur ridge. Its economy centers on vineyards, farming and animal husbandry. The village has a secondary school, a club, two libraries, a communication branch, and a medical center, and has a population of 383. The Ilandağ cuneiform inscriptions have been recorded in the vicinity of the village.

== Etymology ==
The name of the village comes from the words koş (temporary housing for shepherds, homeland, stopping place, migration) and kezen (span, mountain crest) phonetic form of the word kesin/keşin in the Turkic languages and means "stopping place of shepherds on the crest of the mountain".

== Historical and archaeological sites ==
=== Ilandagh cuneiform inscription ===
Ilandagh cuneiform inscriptions dating from 820–810 BC, were discovered on the İlandağ (Ilandagh) mountain. Cuneiform script is ideographic, reflecting whole words or morphemes. The Ilandagh cuneiform inscriptions show that the kings of Urartu, Ishpuini and his son Menua, attacked this area in the period when they ruled together. The inscription mentions three cities and reports a sacrifice to their gods for victory. The discovery of this object was first published in Italy in 1989.

=== Qıtqın (Gytgyn) ===
Qıtqın (Gytgyn) is an ancient settlement north-east of Khoshkeshin village, on the left bank of the Alinjachay River. It is surrounded by a deep canyon to the east, high mountains in the north, and small hills along the Alinjachay in the south and west. Its area is 17600 m2. A large part of the historic site has been plowed and planted, so the cultural layer has been destroyed. Excavations have discovered cobblestones, glazed and unglazed clay pots and pink baked bricks. The artifacts discovered here are kept at the History and Ethnography Museum of the Julfa rayon. It is believed that the settlement dates from the second half of the 1st millennium BC and lasted until the first centuries of the Common Era.

=== Khoshkeshin ===
Khoshkeshin is a medieval settlement (14th-18th centuries) near the village of the same name in Julfa rayon. Its slums and cemetery were found and archaeological excavations have been carried out and samples of the surface culture material obtained.

=== Khoshkeshin Necropolis ===
Khoshkeshin Necropolis - This archaeological site to the east of the Khoshkeshin village, sits approximately 100m in altitude above the valley of the Alinjachay. Farming has destroyed the western part of the necropolis. Besides human skeletons, samples of clay pottery in red and gray have been found here. The pottery spans a period from the 1st millennium BC up to the beginning of the common era.

== See also ==
- Gal, Azerbaijan, nearby village
