= Galik =

Galik may refer to:

- Galik alphabet, an extension to the Mongolian script
- Galík, a Czech surname
- Gálik, a Slovak surname
