= Qal =

Qal or QAL may refer to:

- Gal, Azerbaijan
- Qal (linguistics), simple form of a Hebrew verb
- Query Abstraction Layer, a Python library
- Queensland Alumina Limited, Australian company
- Queen + Adam Lambert, a musical collaboration
