= Noah's Mausoleum (Nakhchivan, Azerbaijan) =

Tomb in Azerbaijan

Coordinates: 39°11′42″N 45°24′41″E

- Nuh peyğəmbərin türbəsi
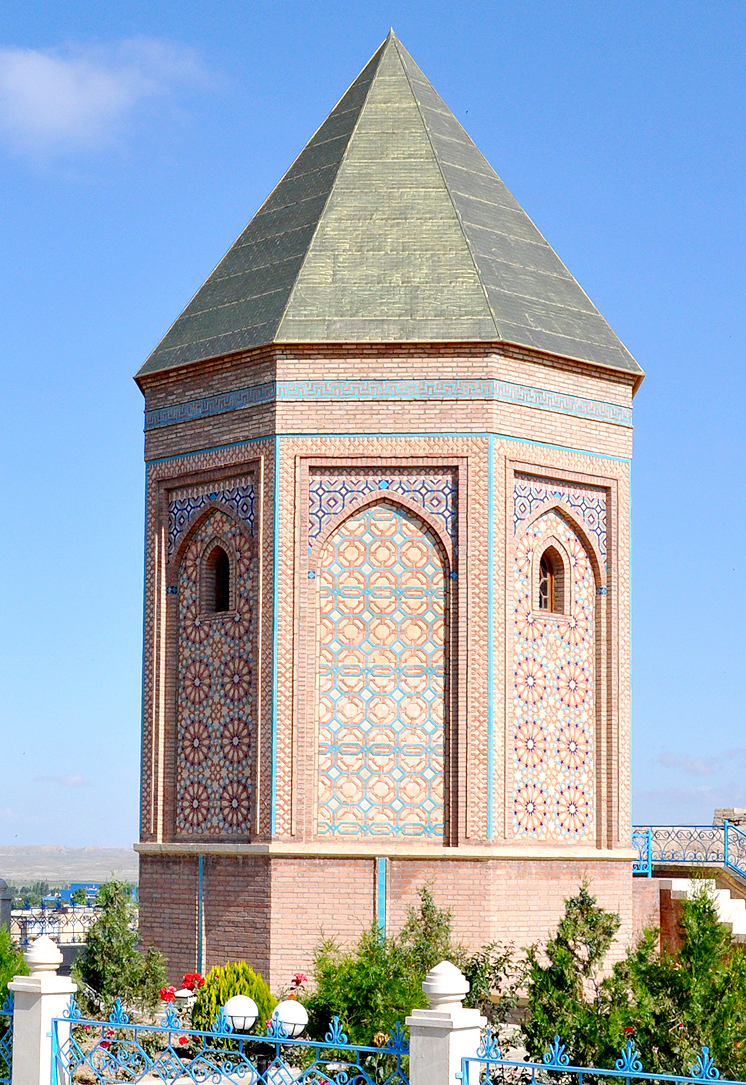
- Interactive map of Noah's Mausoleum
- Location: Nakhchivan, Azerbaijan
- Type: Mausoleum
- Beginning date: 8th century
- Dedicated to: Noah

The Tomb of Prophet Noah (Azerbaijani: Nuh peyğəmbər türbəsi) or Noah's Mausoleum (Armenian: Նոյի գերեզման) is a mausoleum in the city of Nakhchivan, Azerbaijan. As, according to Armenian tradition, Nakhchivan was founded by Noah.

Noah's tomb is located in the town of Nakhchivan. The mausoleum was originally part of a medieval Armenian church structure, monastery, and pilgrimage site dating back to the 12th or 13th-century. 19th century Russian and European sources such as the Brockhaus and Efron Encyclopedic Dictionary and John Foster Fraser noted that the local Armenians considered it a holy place, describing it as a "featureless, mud-covered building that the Armenians regard as holy". James Theodore Bent in his 1986 The Contemporary Review described the site as a popular Christian Armenian shrine. The original Armenian structure was destroyed by the Soviets in 1953.

The current mausoleum was built in 2006 over the destroyed remains of the tomb-mausoleum. The tomb consists of the remains of the lower story of a former temple. There is a ladder leading to a burial vault. There is a stone column in the middle of the vault. According to legend, relics of Noah are under this column. A portrait describing the mausoleum of Noah 100 years ago painted by Bahruz Kangarli is saved in the National Art Museum of Azerbaijan.

== Gallery ==
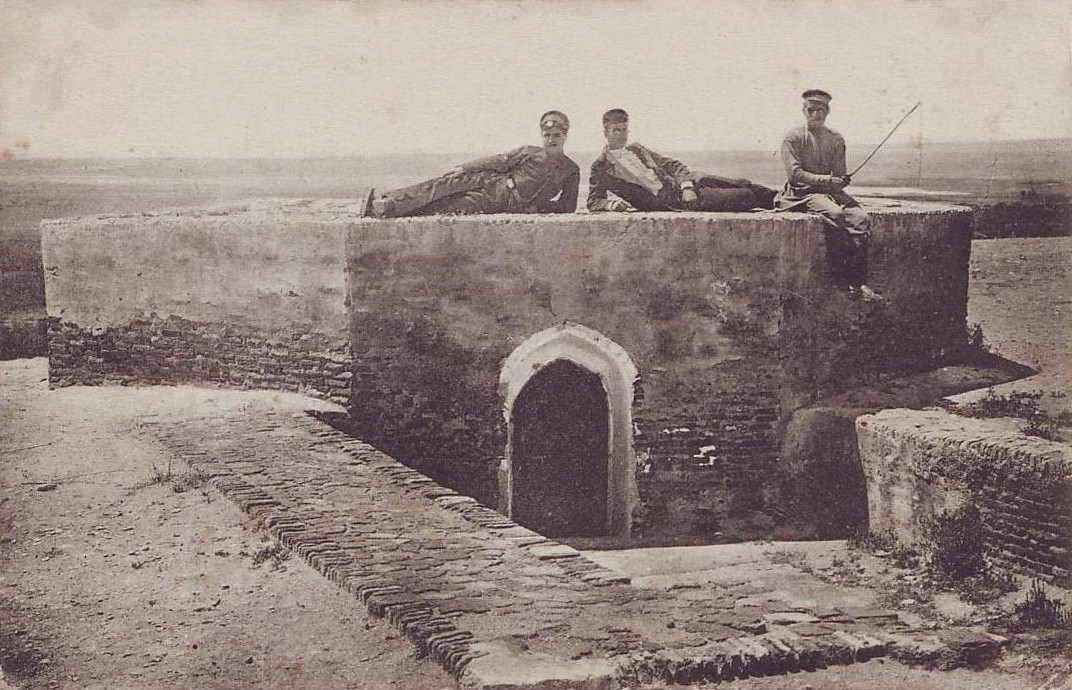
Postcard of the Russian Empire

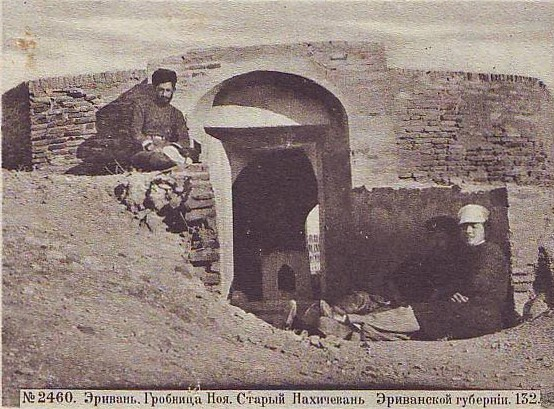
Postcard of the Russian Empire

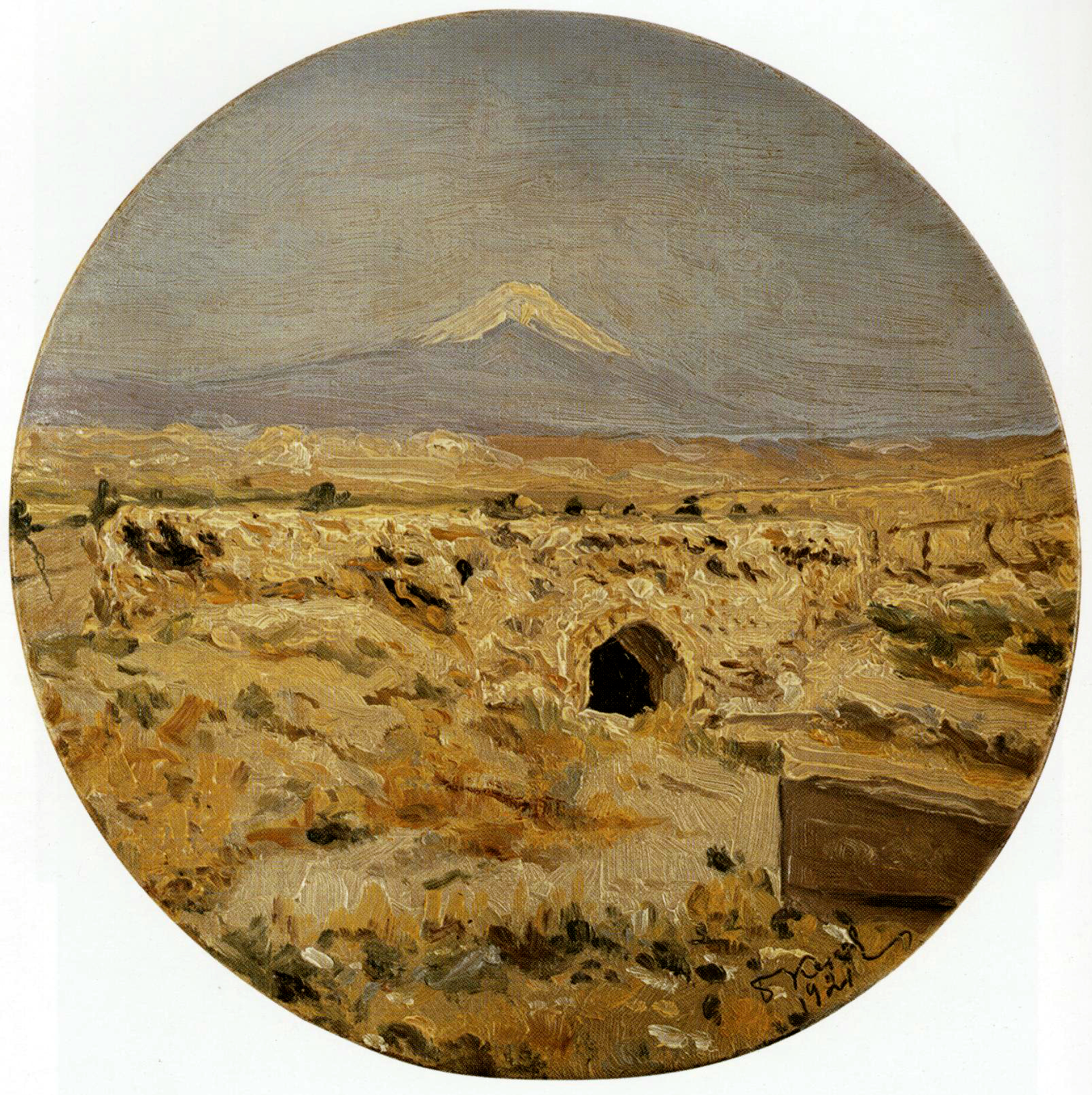
Mausoleum in the portrait by Behruz Kangarli, the early 20th century

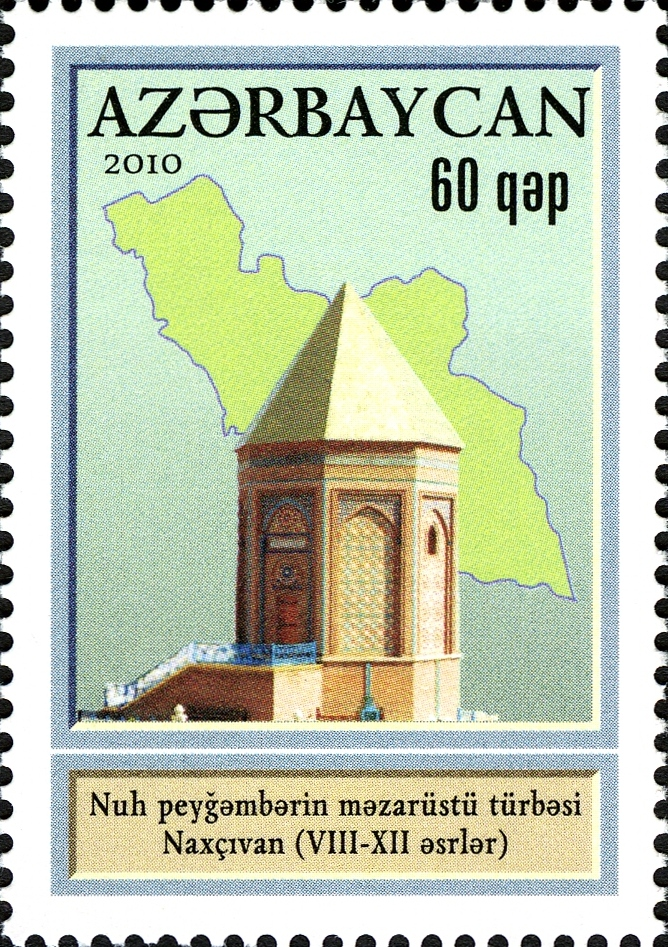
Postage stamp of Azerbaijan, 2010

== See also ==
- İlandağ of the Lesser Caucasus
- Nuh
