= Sandor Gal =

Sandor Gal may refer to:

- Sándor Gál (1855–1937), Hungarian lawyer and politician
- Șandor Gal (born 1955), Romanian ice hockey player
