= Gál =

Gál is a Hungarian surname. Notable people with the surname include:

- András Gál (born 1989), Hungarian football defender with BFC Siófok
- Bernhard Gál (born 1971), Austrian artist, composer and musicologist
- Csaba Gál (born 1985), Romanian rugby union footballer
- Gyula Gál (born 1976), Hungarian handball player
- Hans Gál (1890–1987), Austro-British composer, teacher and pianist
- Henrik Gál (born 1947), Hungarian former Olympic wrestler
- István Sándor Gál or Steven Gaal (1924–2016), Hungarian-American mathematician
- Kinga Gál (born 1970), a Hungarian politician and political writer
- Róbert Gál (born 1979), Hungarian artistic gymnast
- Sándor Gál (1868–1937), Hungarian lawyer and politician
- Tímea Gál (born 1984), Hungarian woman footballer
- Zoltán Gál (born 1940), Hungarian politician
- Zoltán J. Gál (born 1973), Hungarian politician

== See also ==
- Gal (disambiguation)
- Gaal (disambiguation)
