= Gals =

Gals may refer to:

- Gals (satellite), Russian communications satellite
- Gals, Switzerland, Seeland, Bern; a municipality
- Gals!, a shoujo Japanese manga comic by Mihona Fujii
- GALS screen (gait, arms, legs, spine), a medical screening test
- Giant African land snail, common name of several species within the family Achatinidae
- Globally asynchronous locally synchronous, an electronic circuit architecture

== See also ==
- Gals, Incorporated (1943 film) U.S. comedy film
- The Girls (1961 film), Soviet film of 1962, alternative translation
- Gal (disambiguation), for the singular of "gals"
