= St. Grigor Church =

St. Grigor Church may refer to several former Armenian churches in the Nakhchivan Autonomous Republic of Azerbaijan:

- St. Grigor Church (Chalkhangala), in Kangarli district
- St. Grigor Church (Gal), in Julfa district
- St. Grigor Church (Gomur), in Shahbuz district
- St. Grigor Church (Kulus), in Shahbuz district
