= Galík =

Galík (feminine: Galíková) is a Czech surname, derived from the given name Gal. A similar Slovak surname is Gálik. Notable people with the surname include:

- Jana Galíková (born 1963), Czech orienteer
- Svatoslav Galík (1938–2019), Czech hotelier and orienteer
