= Gyula Justh =

Hungarian politician

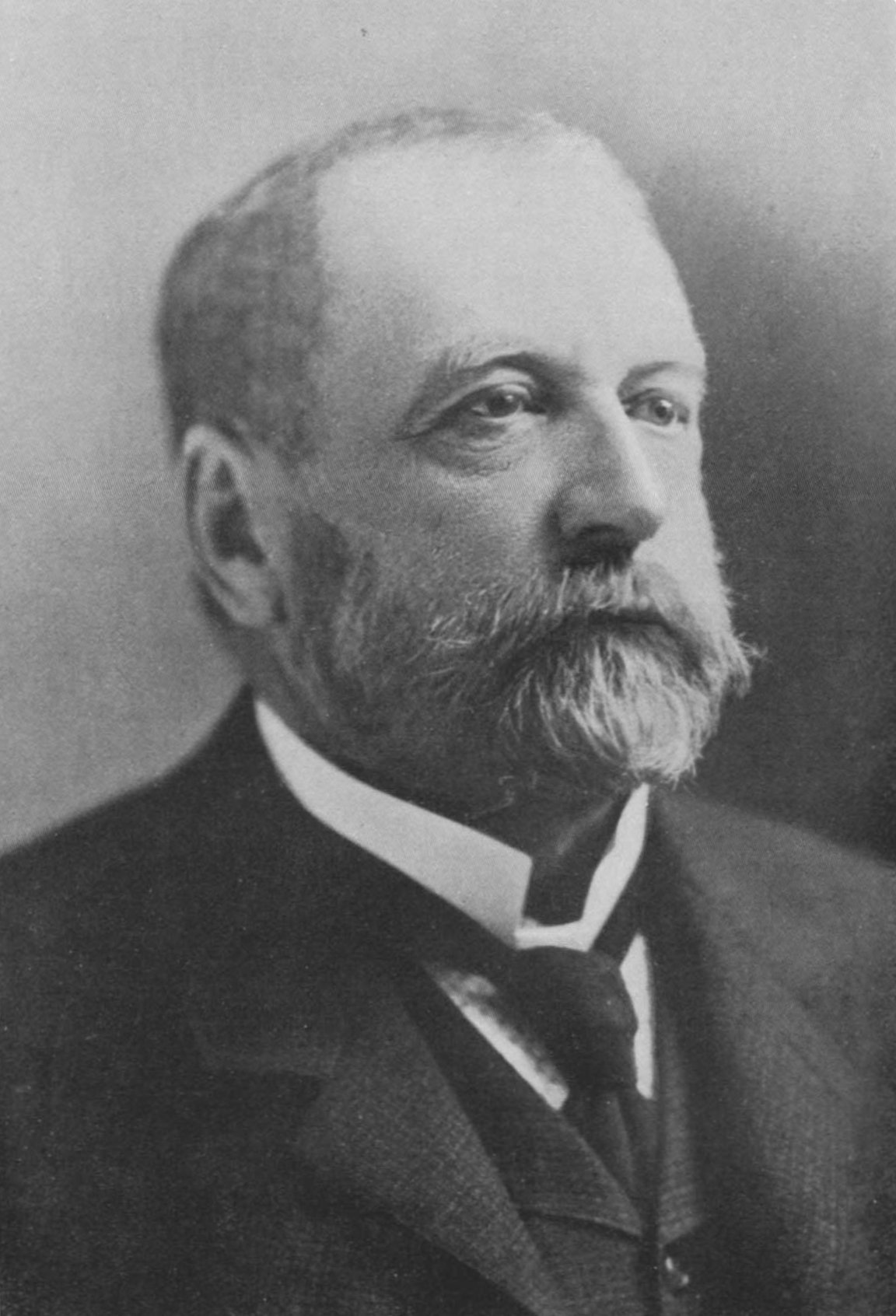

Speaker of the House of Representatives
- In office 21 February 1905 – 12 November 1909
- Preceded by: Dezső Perczel
- Succeeded by: Sándor Gál

Personal details
- Born: 13 January 1850 Necpál, Kingdom of Hungary (today Necpaly, Slovakia)
- Died: 9 October 1917 (aged 67) Budapest, Austria-Hungary
- Party: Independence Party of 48
- Profession: jurist, politician

Gyula Justh (13 January 1850 – 9 October 1917) was a Hungarian jurist and politician, who served as Speaker of the House of Representatives between 1905 and 1909.

== Biography ==
He was born in Necpál, Turóc County (today: Necpaly, Slovakia) as a child of István Justh and Margit Pákozdy. After finishing law studies he became Chief Constable of Gyula District however the governing Liberal Party overthrew him because of his thoughts of independence against Austro-Hungarian Compromise. After that he returned to his estate in Tornya (today Turnu, Romania). Later he farmed in his property in Csanád County.

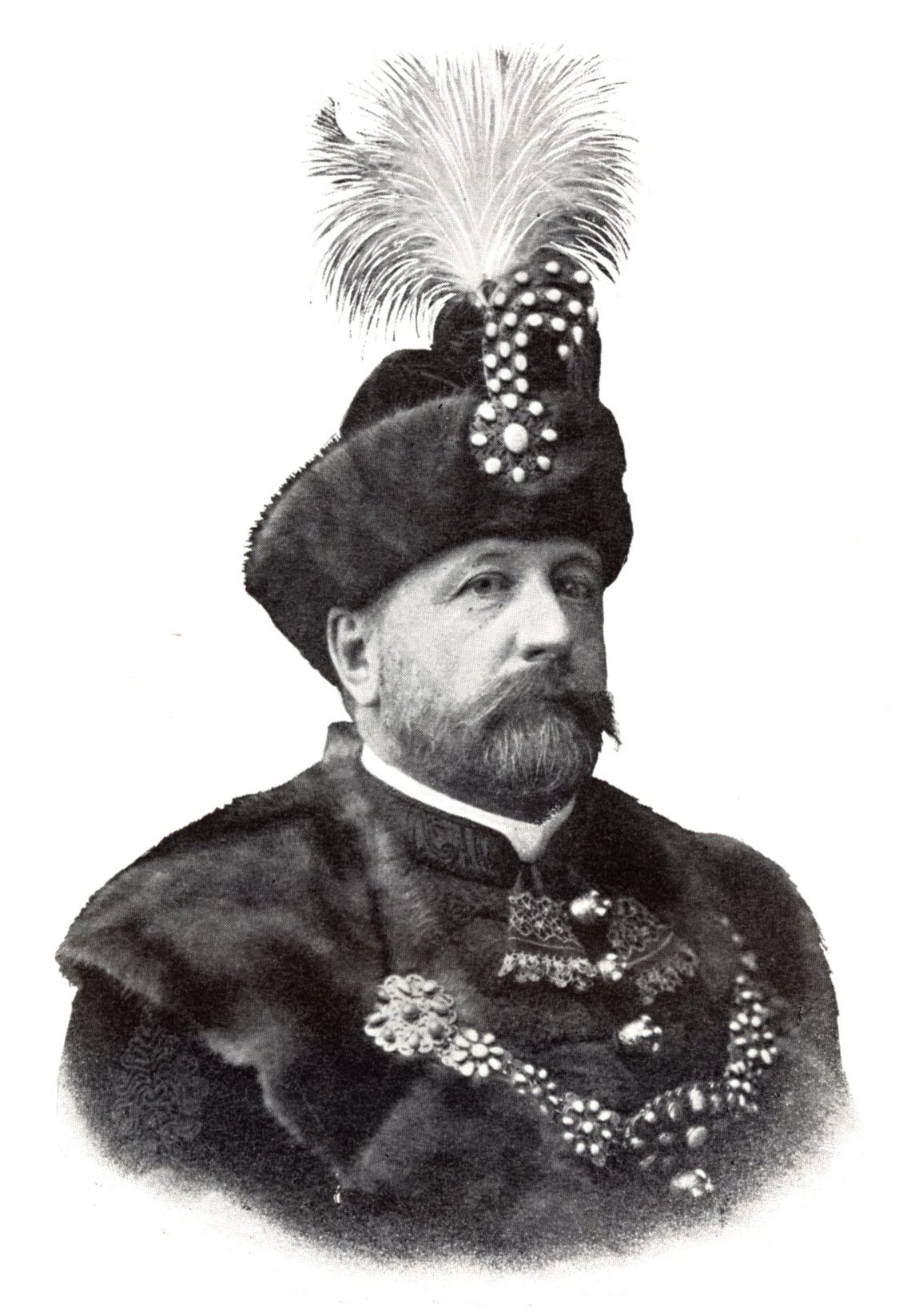
Justh in díszmagyar in 1905

He was elected Member of Parliament for Makó in 1884. He held this position until his death. He often spoke out for civic democratic reforms. He served as deputy chairman of the Independence Party since 1891 and as chairman from 1893 when the previous leader Dániel Irányi died. He had a significant role in the developing of the Church Policy Act during the first cabinet of Sándor Wekerle in 1894-1895. After the division of "48 factions" he broke up with the faction which was led by Gábor Ugron.

He became chairman again when the party reunited, but soon resigned from his position for Ferenc Kossuth's benefit. Two years later, he had a role in the protests against Press Criminal Procedure. He was one of the leaders of the filibuster in 1898 which led to the resignation of Prime Minister Dezső Bánffy.

Justh was appointed Speaker of the House of Representatives in 1905 when his party won a majority in the lower house. Unlike Ferenc Kossuth, he proved to be understanding in the case of Croatian representatives' obstruction who convicted the Hungarian service language among the Croatian Railways. He fought for the introduction of universal suffrage on the side of the Hungarian Social Democratic Party and Civil Radicals (Oszkár Jászi). He resigned in 1909 when he came into conflict with Kossuth in the issue of an independent national bank (the Hungarian National Bank was created only in 1924). He led the obstruction against István Tisza in 1912. One year later he was the co-chairman, along with Kossuth, of the united opposition against the Prime Minister's policy, but the real power was concentrated in the hands of Count Mihály Károlyi. Justh agreed with the radical programs of Károlyi.

In the last years he suffered from illness and lived in retreat. He is an honorary citizen of Makó.

Political offices
Preceded by Dezső Perczel	Speaker of the House of Representatives; 1905–1909	Succeeded by Sándor Gál
