= Gálik =

Gálik (feminine: Gáliková) is a Slovak surname, derived from the given name Gal. A similar Czech surname is Galík. Notable people with the surname include:

- Branislav Gálik (born 1973), Slovak tennis player
- Mária Gáliková (born 1980), Slovak race walker
- Martin Gálik (born 1979), Slovak ice hockey player
