= Necpaly =

- Municipality
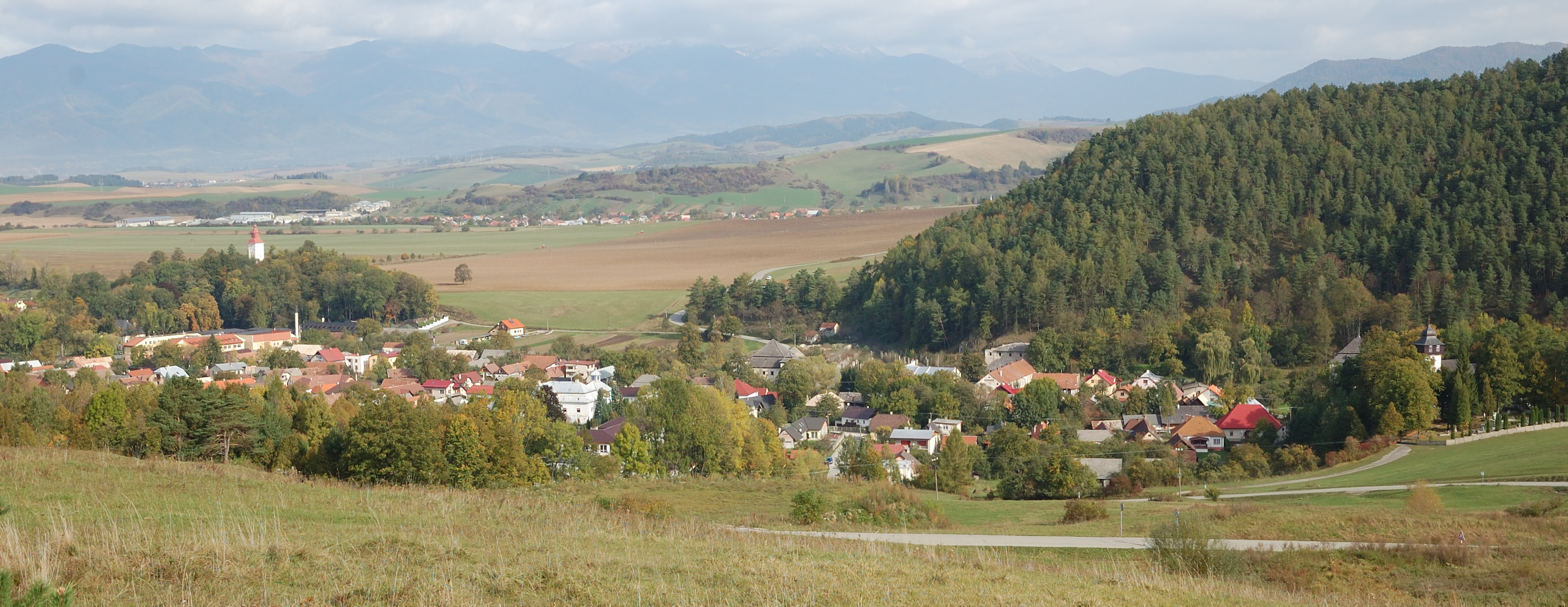

- Flag Coat of arms

- Location of Necpaly in the Žilina Region Location of Necpaly in Slovakia
- Coordinates: 48.98°N 18.98°E
- Country: Slovakia
- Region: Žilina Region
- District: Martin District
- First mentioned: 1266

Area
  - Total: 42.17 km^{2} (16.28 sq mi)
- Elevation: 500 m (1,600 ft)

Population (2025)
  - Total: 1,017
- Time zone: UTC+1 (CET)
  - Summer (DST): UTC+2 (CEST)
- Postal code: 381 2
- Area code: +421 43
- Vehicle registration plate (until 2022): MT
- Website: www.necpaly.sk

Necpaly (Hungarian: Necpál) is a village and municipality in Martin District in the Žilina Region of northern Slovakia.

== Etymology ==
The name is derived from an adjective necpalý referring to a low density village (Slovak: cpať - to push, to overcrowd, a negative verb necpať).

== History ==
In historical records the village was first mentioned in 1266. Before the establishment of independent Czechoslovakia in 1918, it was part of Turóc County within the Kingdom of Hungary. From 1939 to 1945, it was part of the Slovak Republic.

== Manor house ==
In the 19th century the chateau got under control of Franklins. The first member of the Franklins’ clan was Benjamin Franklin, an illegitimate son of Dionyz Justh and great-granddaughter of Benjamin Franklin.

== Geography ==
The municipality lies at an altitude of 500 metres (1,600 ft) and covers an area of 42.17 km^{2} (16.28 sq mi) (2025).

== Population ==
Population statistic (10 years)
| Year | 1995 | 2005 | 2015 | 2025 |
|---|---|---|---|---|
| Count | 796 | 824 | 894 | 1017 |
| Difference | | +3.51% | +8.49% | +13.75% |

Population statistic
| Year | 2024 | 2025 |
|---|---|---|
| Count | 1023 | 1017 |
| Difference | | −0.58% |

It has a population of 1017 people (31 December 2025).

=== Ethnicity ===
Census 2021 (1+ %)
| Ethnicity | Number | Fraction |
|---|---|---|
| Slovak | 959 | 96.09% |
| Not found out | 37 | 3.7% |
| Total | 998 | |

In year 2021 was 998 people by ethnicity 959 as Slovak, 37 as Not found out, 7 as Other, 4 as Czech, 1 as Chinese, 1 as Irish, 1 as Rusyn, 1 as Russian and 1 as German.

Note on population: The difference values of population numbers in the table "Population statistic" and in the sections "Ethnicity" & "Religion" is caused by the use of various statistical methods.

=== Religion ===
Census 2021 (1+ %)
| Religion | Number | Fraction |
|---|---|---|
| None | 373 | 37.37% |
| Evangelical Church | 305 | 30.56% |
| Roman Catholic Church | 248 | 24.85% |
| Not found out | 45 | 4.51% |
| Christian Congregations in Slovakia | 11 | 1.1% |
| Total | 998 | |

In year 2021 was 998 people by religion 373 from None, 305 from Evangelical Church, 248 from Roman Catholic Church, 45 from Not found out, 11 from Christian Congregations in Slovakia, 5 from Ad hoc movements, 3 from Paganism and natural spirituality, 3 from Other, 2 from Other and not ascertained christian church, 2 from Seventh-day Adventist Church and 1 from Greek Catholic Church.

== Municipal water power station ==
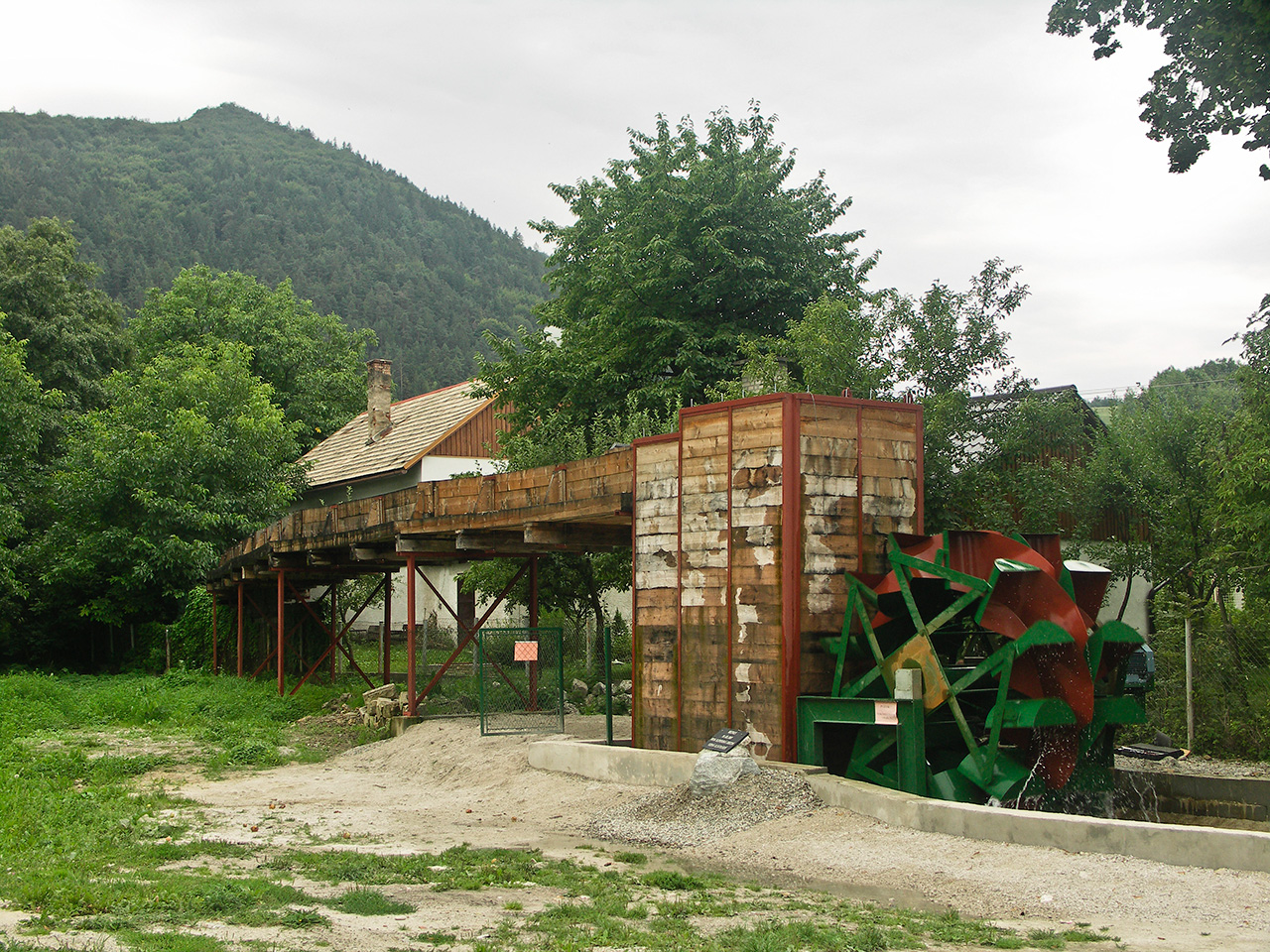
The first municipal water power station in Slovakia

In summer 2007 the first municipal water power station in Slovakia started generating electricity which is in part used for the municipal office building needs and public lighting and in part supplied to the public grid. It is expected to have a yearly output of 160,000 kW. The construction, which cost 5 million Slovak crowns, should be profitable after five years of operation. Three more similar power stations are planned to be finished by the end of 2007 in Necpaly.

== Notable people ==
- György Lahner (1795-1849), one of the Thirteen Martyrs of Arad
- Gyula Justh (1850-1917), Hungarian jurist and politician
