= ZAZ10TS =

Art gallery in New York City

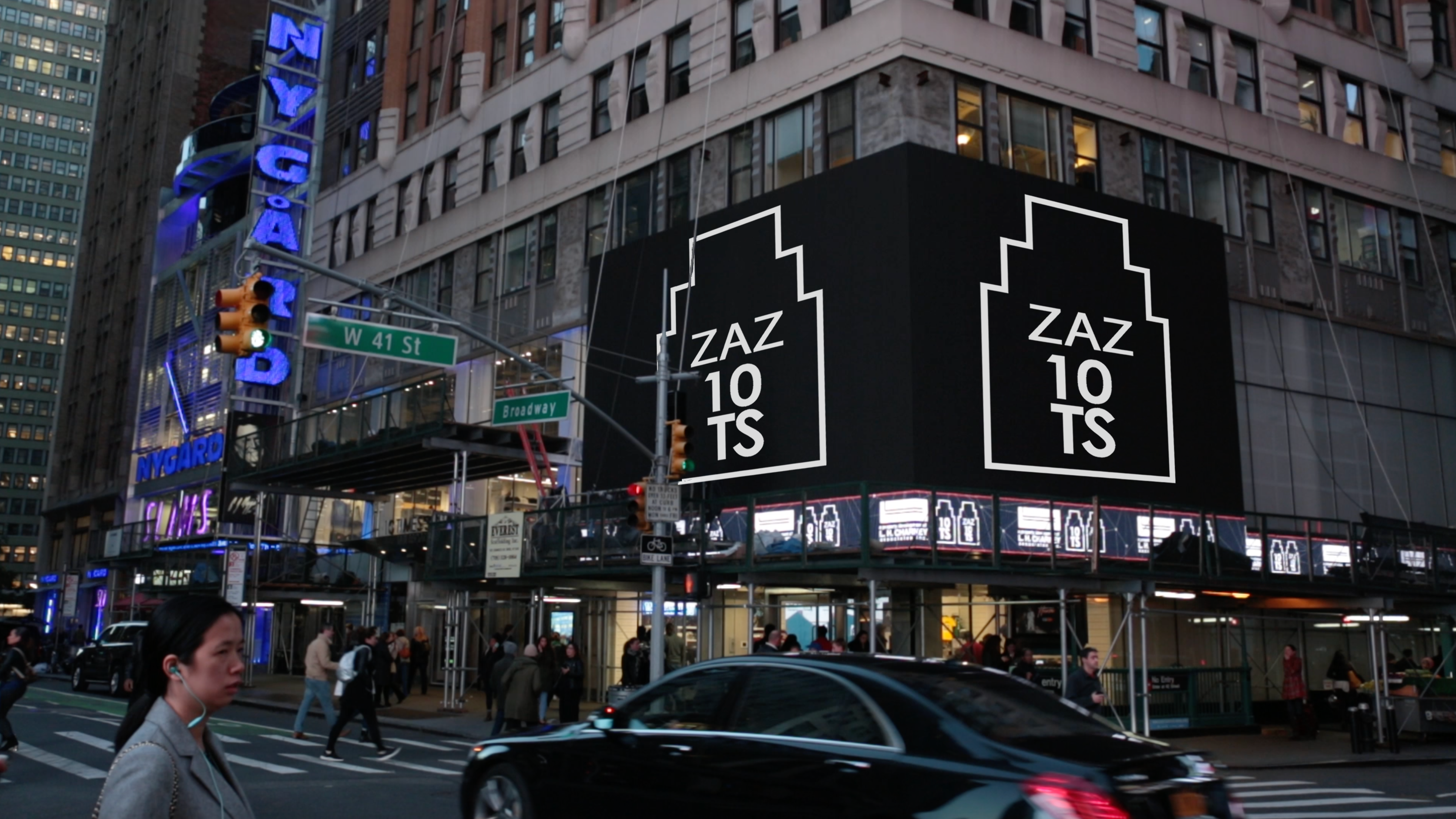
- Established: December 2017
- Location: 10 Times Square; 1441 Broadway; Manhattan, New York City
- Coordinates: 40.75491°N 73.98716°W
- Public transit access: Subway: Times Square–42nd Street
- Website: www.zaz10ts.com

ZAZ10TS, or ZAZ 10 Times Square, is an art gallery and cultural initiative located in Midtown Manhattan, New York City and situated in the lobby of the office building at 10 Times Square. Conceived by curator and philanthropist Tzili Charney, ZAZ10TS engages with the public through emerging art.

Using the building’s lobby and its exterior Times Square video billboard, ZAZ10TS showcases rotating art exhibitions as well as several permanent art installations.

== Exhibitions ==
- Aaron Pexa: Garden Party (March 5, 2020 to June 30, 2020)
- Boaz Aharonovitch: Growing A Garden For An Unknown Lover (January 23 to February 26, 2020)
- New York Fashion Rediscovered 1982-1997 (September 5, 2019 to January 20, 2020)
- Shony Rivnay: Nature of Wonder (June 13 to September 2, 2019)
- Uri Katzenstein: You Never Know (January 31 to June 10, 2019)
- Claudia Alvarez: A Moment in Between (November 1, 2018 to January 28, 2019)
- Maskit X Eyal Nevo: Mount Sodom (September 6 to October 28, 2018)
- Sara Berman: Between Community and Commerce (July 11 to September 4, 2018)
- Lore Riess (July 10, 2018)
