= Miriam Cabessa =

Israeli-American painter, performance and installation artist

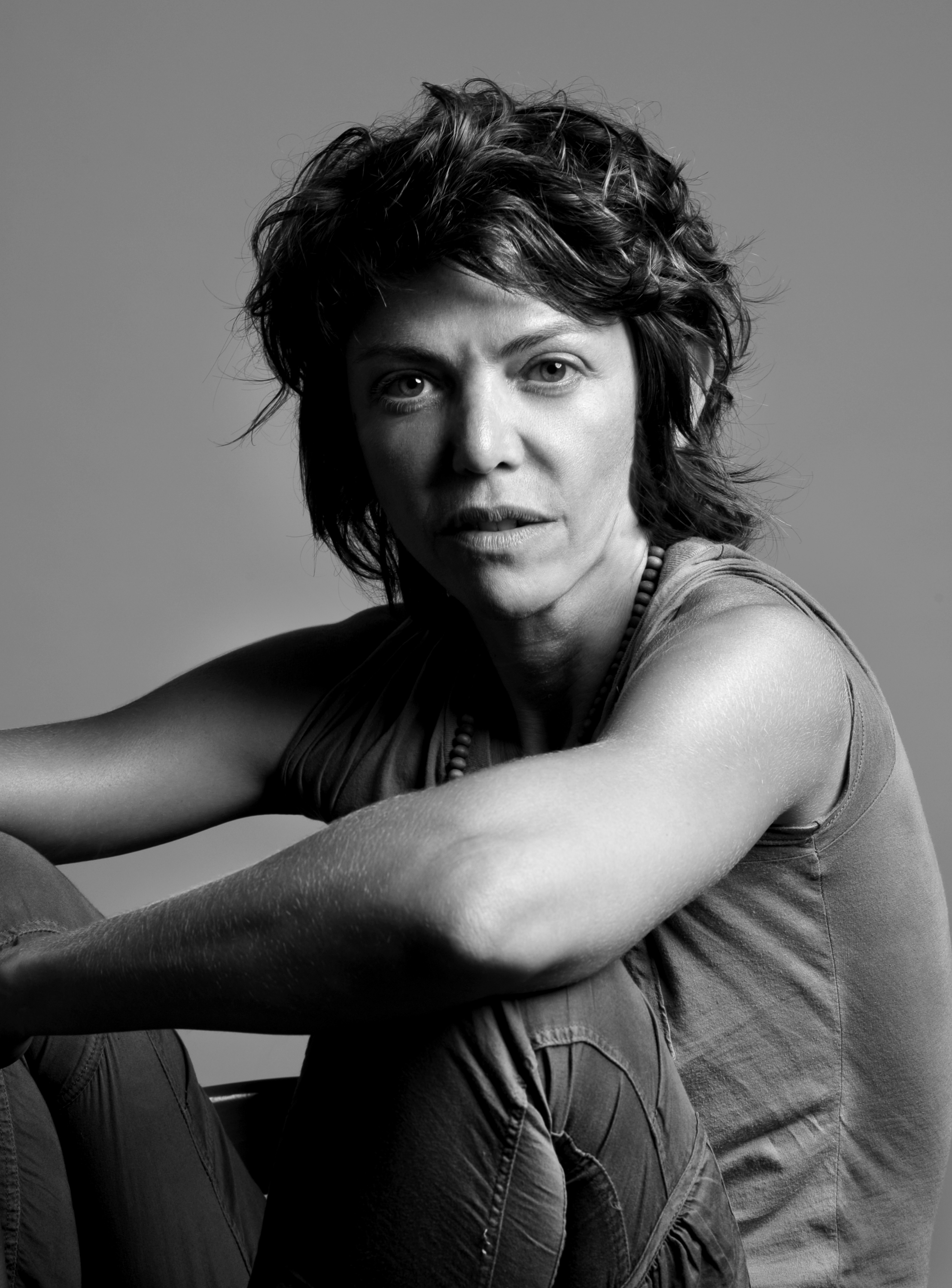
Miriam Cabessa

Miriam Cabessa is an Israeli-American painter, performance and installation artist, and winner of the 2022 Israeli Ministry of Culture Lifetime Achievement Award.

Her paintings are part of major collections such as: The British Museum, the Frederick R. Weisman Foundation, Tel Aviv Museum of Art, Imago Mundi at Treviso, Italy, American University Museum, the Israel Museum in Jerusalem, Texas State University, and many more.

== Personal life ==
Cabessa is a lesbian. She lives and works with her partner Noa Raveh. Cabessa and Raveh founded the Malka Publishing House in 2024.
