= Uri Katzenstein =

Israeli visual artist, sculptor, musician and film maker

Professor Uri Katzenstein
- אורי קצנשטיין
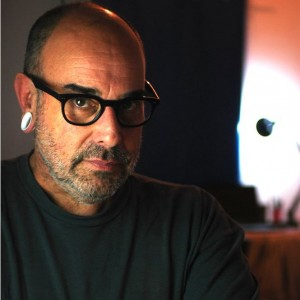
- Photo of Uri Katzenstein (Photographer: Avi Levin)
- Born: February 17, 1951; Tel Aviv, Israel
- Died: August 24, 2018 (aged 67)
- Education: San Francisco Art Institute
- Known for: Sculpting, visual art, music and film
- Notable work: "Patʹshegen" (1993) "Family of Brothers" (2000) "Backyard" (2015)
- Movement: Avant-garde
- Website: urikatzenstein.com

Uri Katzenstein (Hebrew: אורי קצנשטיין; February 17, 1951 – August 24, 2018) was an Israeli visual artist, sculptor, musician, builder of musical instruments and sound machines, and film maker.

== Background ==
Uri was born in Tel Aviv, Israel in 1951 and was the only child of German-born parents who moved to Mandatory Palestine before the Holocaust. In his youth, he played music and joined several Rock bands. In 1969, he joined the Israel Defense Forces and fought in the Yom Kippur War as a medic. During the late 1970s of the 20th century, Uri studied at the San Francisco Art Institute and after receiving his MFA moved to New York City where he lived and worked throughout the 1980s. His early works, starting from the late 1970s, involved different avant-garde media Exhibits, music, performance, video and sound art. In the mid-1990s of the 20th century, he began creating sculptured Figurines, in addition to objects and sound machines which were all merged and composed as one time-based viewing / listening events.

== Career ==
After returning to Israel, he and Noam HaLevi produced the show "Midas". In 1993 he took part in the rock opera "Samara" by Hillel Mittelpunkt and the band Nikmat HaTraktor. In 1999, he issued a music album, along with Ohad Fishof, entitled "Skin O Daayba", which served as the basis for a musical performance. In 2001, he produced the show "Home" along with Renana Raz and Ohad Fishof. In the early 2000s he began to create video art consisting of surreal events while emphasizing subject matter of personal identity. Among his notable works are Patʹshegen (1993) and "Family of Brothers" (Mishpachat ha-Achim; 2000). His early performance work was regularly presented at such legendary performance venues as The Kitchen, No-Se-No, 8BC and Danceteria. His work in sculpture, video and installation have been exhibited in museums including the Russian State Museum (St. Petersburg), The Chelsea Art Museum (New York City), Kunsthalle Dusseldorf, The Israel Museum, Duke University Museum of Art (North Carolina). Katzenstein participated in the Sao-Paulo Biennale (1991), the Venice Biennale (2001), the Buenos Aires Biennale (first prize, 2002), and the 9th Istanbul Biennale (2005). His performance work appeared in theatres and galleries in London, Berlin, San Francisco, Cardiff (Wales), Santiago de Compostela (Spain), New York City, and Tel Aviv.

From 2003 until his death Uri Katzenstein lectured in the Department of Fine Arts of the Faculty of Humanities at the University of Haifa.

== Death and legacy ==
Uri Katzenstein died on August 24, 2018, following a stroke.

In September 2018, following his death, an exhibition which he was working on, entitled "The Institute of Ongoing Things" opened at the Jewish Historical Museum in Amsterdam. In January 2019, another art exhibition which he was working on entitled "You Never Know" opened at the ZAZ10TS in Times Square in New York City.

In October 2021, more than three years after his death, an exhibition focusing on the art of Uri Katzenstein entitled "Who Comes After Us?" opened at Holon’s Mediatheque and Center for Digital Art.

In February 2025, an exhibition entitled "Cypress Shadows on the Road" by artist Ziva Jelin opened at the Ramat Gan Museum of Israeli Art. Jelin's exhibition consists of paintings she painted following the aftermath of the events at Kibbutz Be'eri on October 7th, 2023. Jelin's works are part of a broader exhibition entitled "What the Heart Wants, Art as a Gateway to Healing" consisting of works by Jelin and other artists who drew inspiration from the works of Uri Katzenstein.

== Awards ==
Katzenstein received the following awards:

- 1982 Creativity Encouragement Award, Israeli Ministry of Education
- 1989 Work Completion Award, Israeli Ministry of Education
- 1992 Grant, The America-Israel Cultural Foundation
- 1998 Grant for Creators in the field of Visual Arts, Israeli Ministry of Education
- 2000 Isracart Award, Tel Aviv Museum of Art
- 2001 Biennale Award, Israeli Pavilion, Venice Biennale, Italy
- 2002 1st prize, Biennale of Art, Buenos Aires, Argentina
- 2014 Dan Sandler and Sandler Foundation Award for Sculpting, Tel Aviv Museum of Art
- 2017 Dizengoff Prize

== Books ==
- ha-Biʼanaleh ha-benleʼumit ha-21 shel San-Paʼulo 1991, Yiśraʼel (1991). by Nurit Daṿid, Yehoshuʻa Borḳovsḳi, Yiśraʼel Rabinovits, Uri Ḳatzenstein OCLC 58404699
- פתשגן / Patʹshegen (1993). by Uri Katzenstein ISBN 978-965-278-130-7
- Uri Katzenstein : missive : The Israel Museum, Jerusalem, (1993). by Uri Katzenstein OCLC 600838262
- Families (2000). by Uri Katzenstein; Duke University. Evans Family Cultural Residency Program. OCLC 49932271
- Uri Katzenstein : home : Venice Biennale 2001, the Israeli Pavilion (2001). by Uri Katzenstein; Yigal Zalmona; Ishai Adar; Binya Reches OCLC 753440505
- Hope machines (2007). by Uri Katzenstein; Merkaz le-omanut ʻakhshaṿit (Tel Aviv, Israel) OCLC 477287150
- Backyard (2015) by Uri Katzenstein; Tel-Aviv Museum ISBN 978-965-539-109-1

== Gallery ==
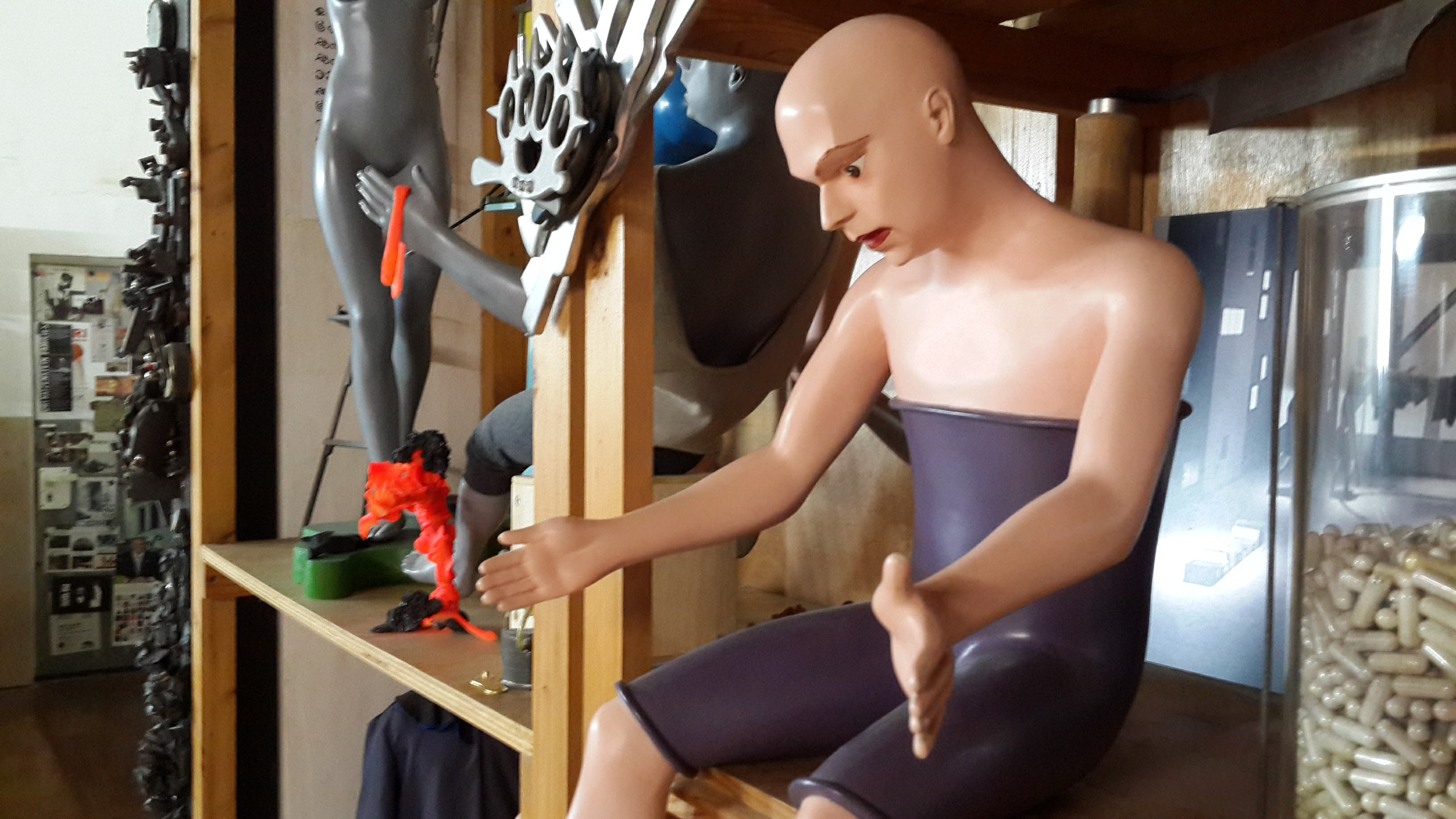
Works by Katzenstein at his studio in Tel Aviv, 14 April 2017

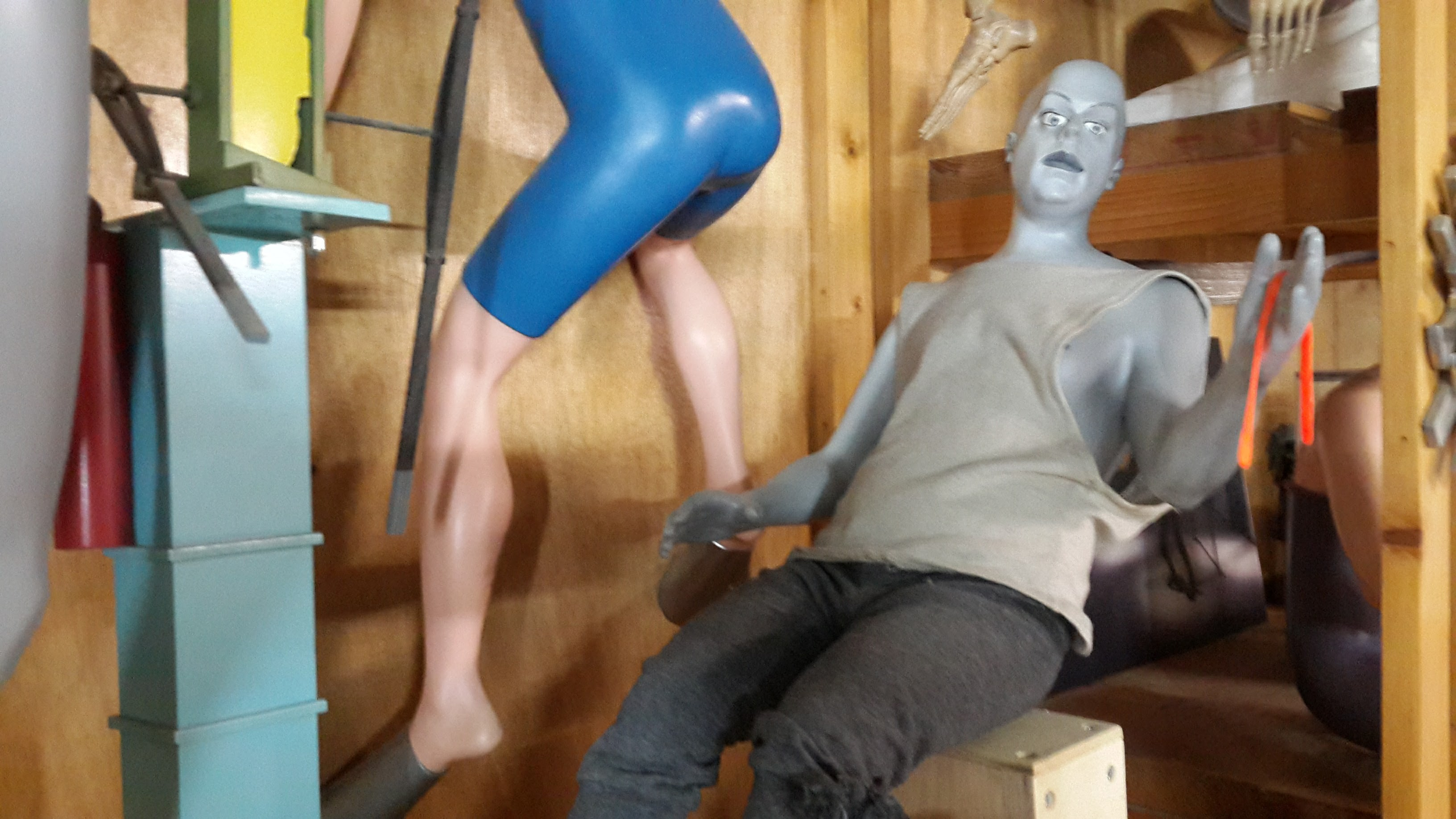
Works by Katzenstein at his studio in Tel Aviv, 14 April 2017

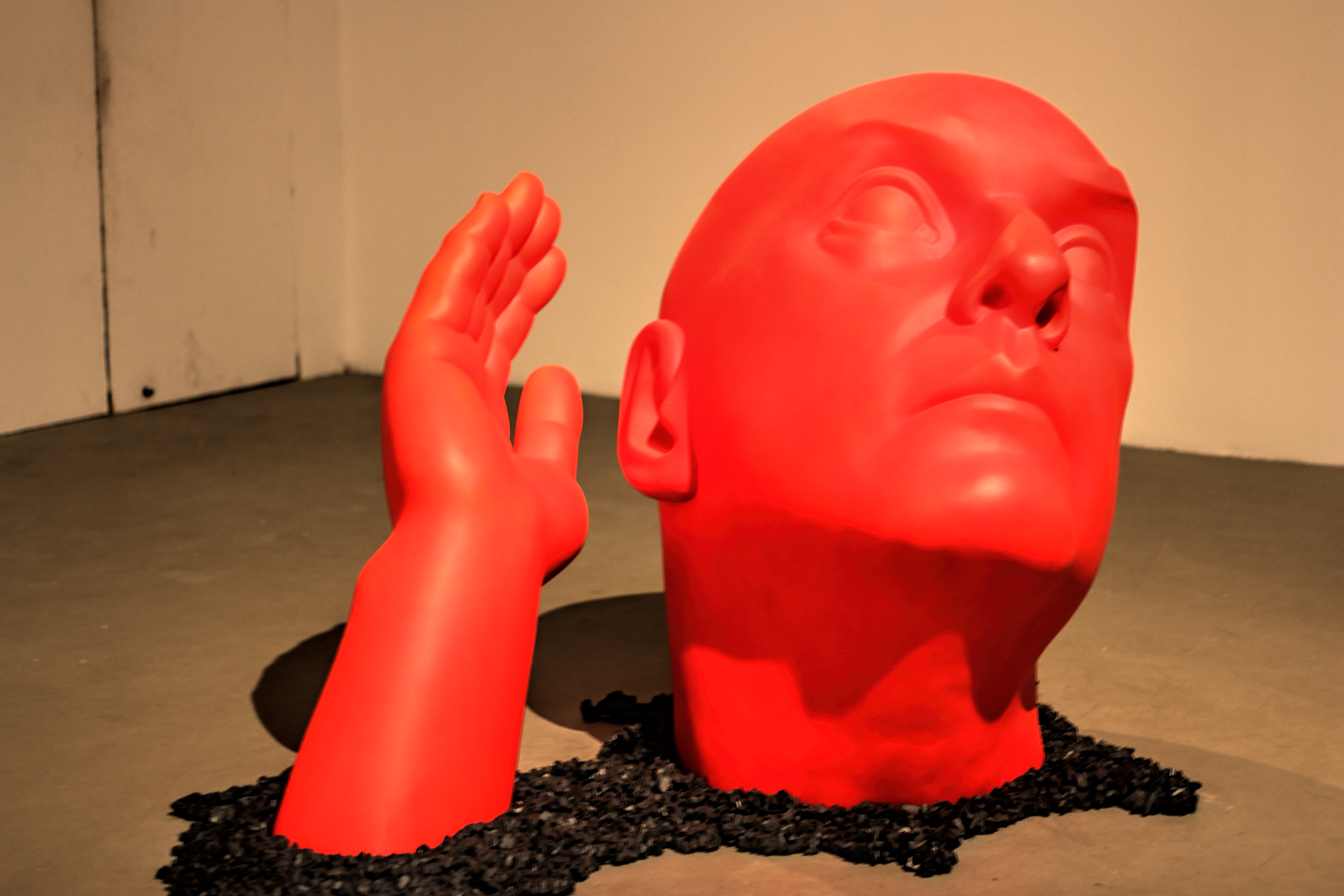
Uri Katzenstein, untitled sculpture at the Tel Aviv Museum of Art, August 2015

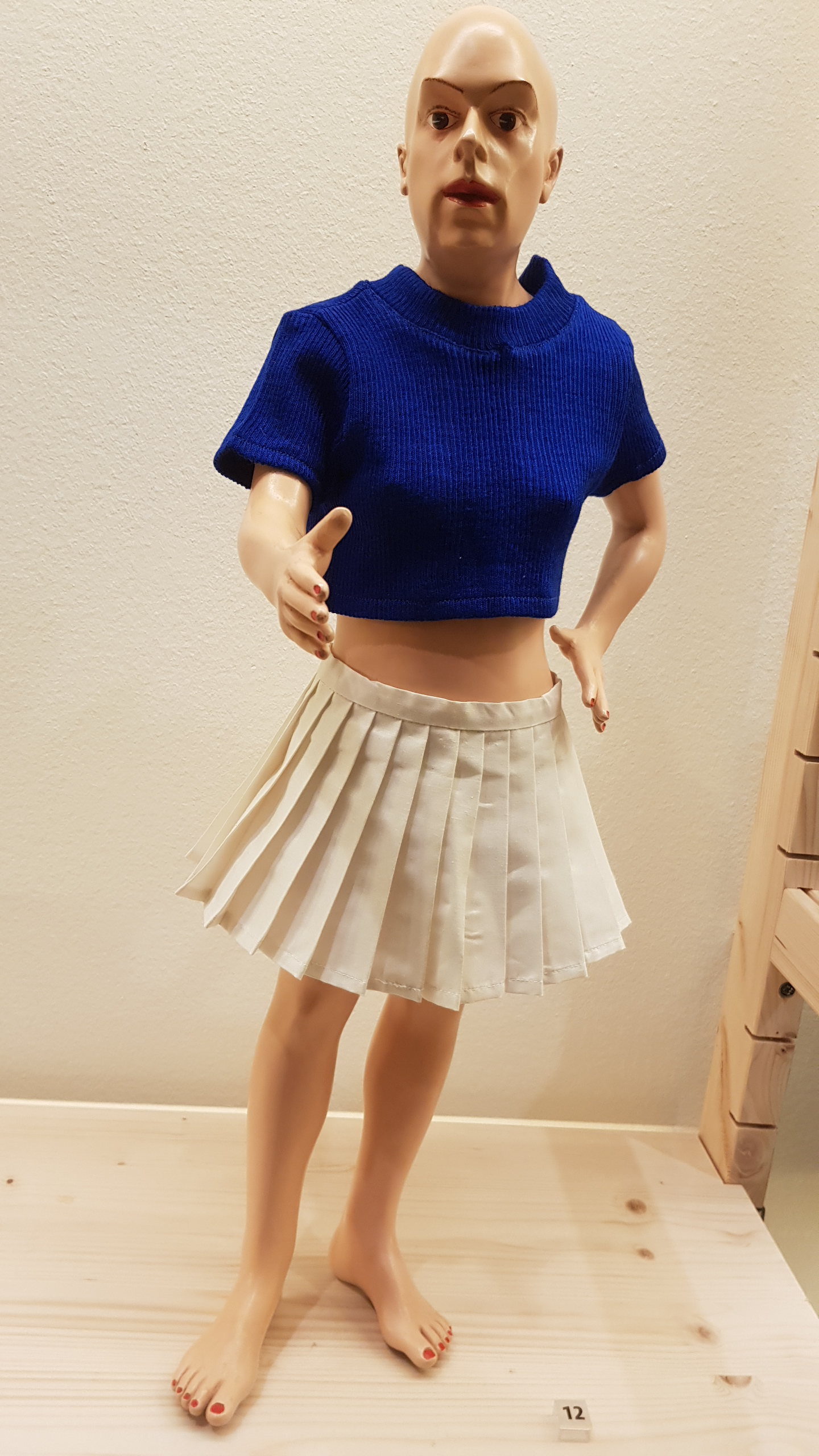
Uri Katzenstein exhibition, "The Institute of Ongoing Things", at the Joods Historisch Museum in Amsterdam, January 2019

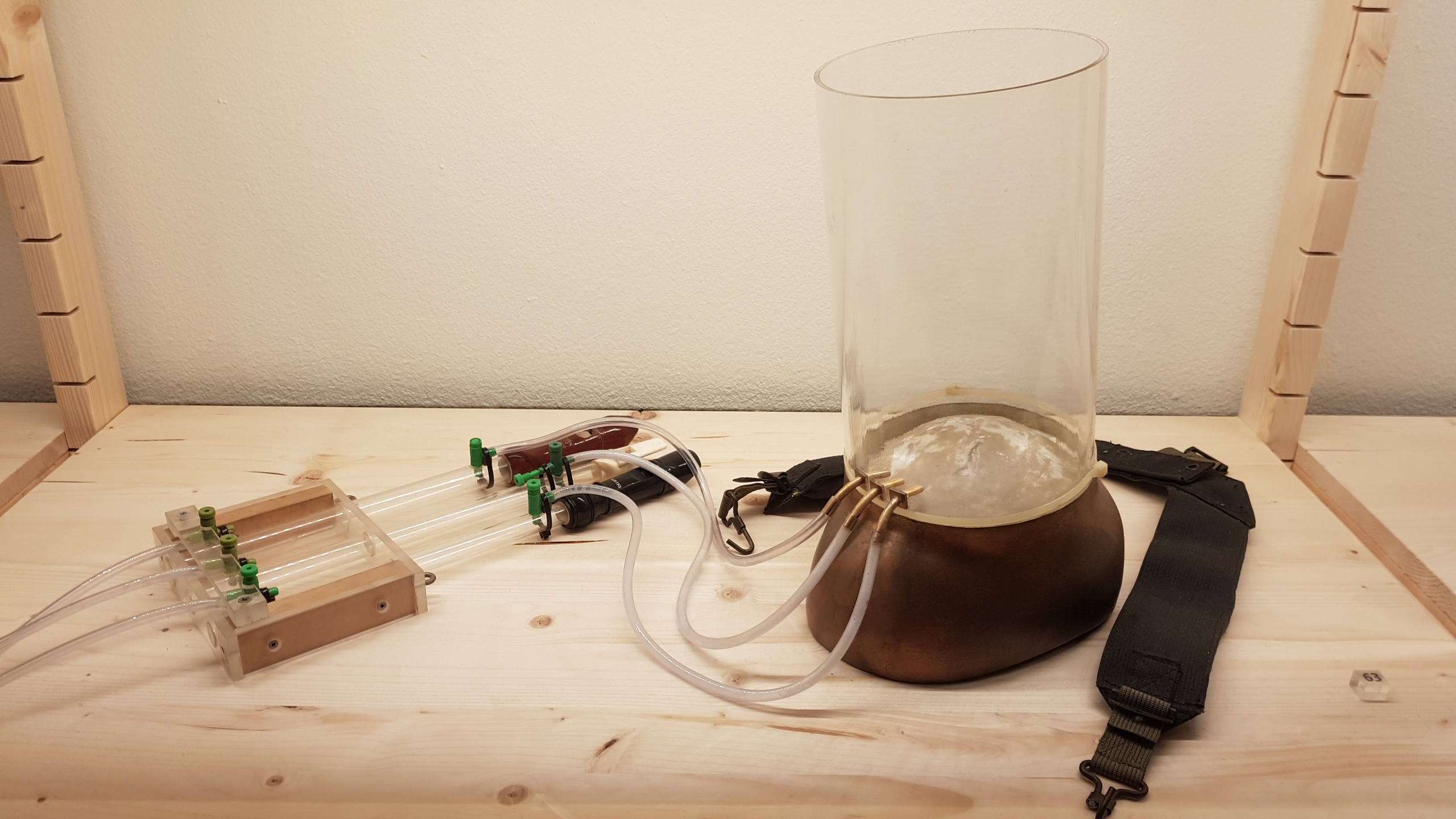
Uri Katzenstein exhibition, "The Institute of Ongoing Things", at the Joods Historisch Museum in Amsterdam, January 2019

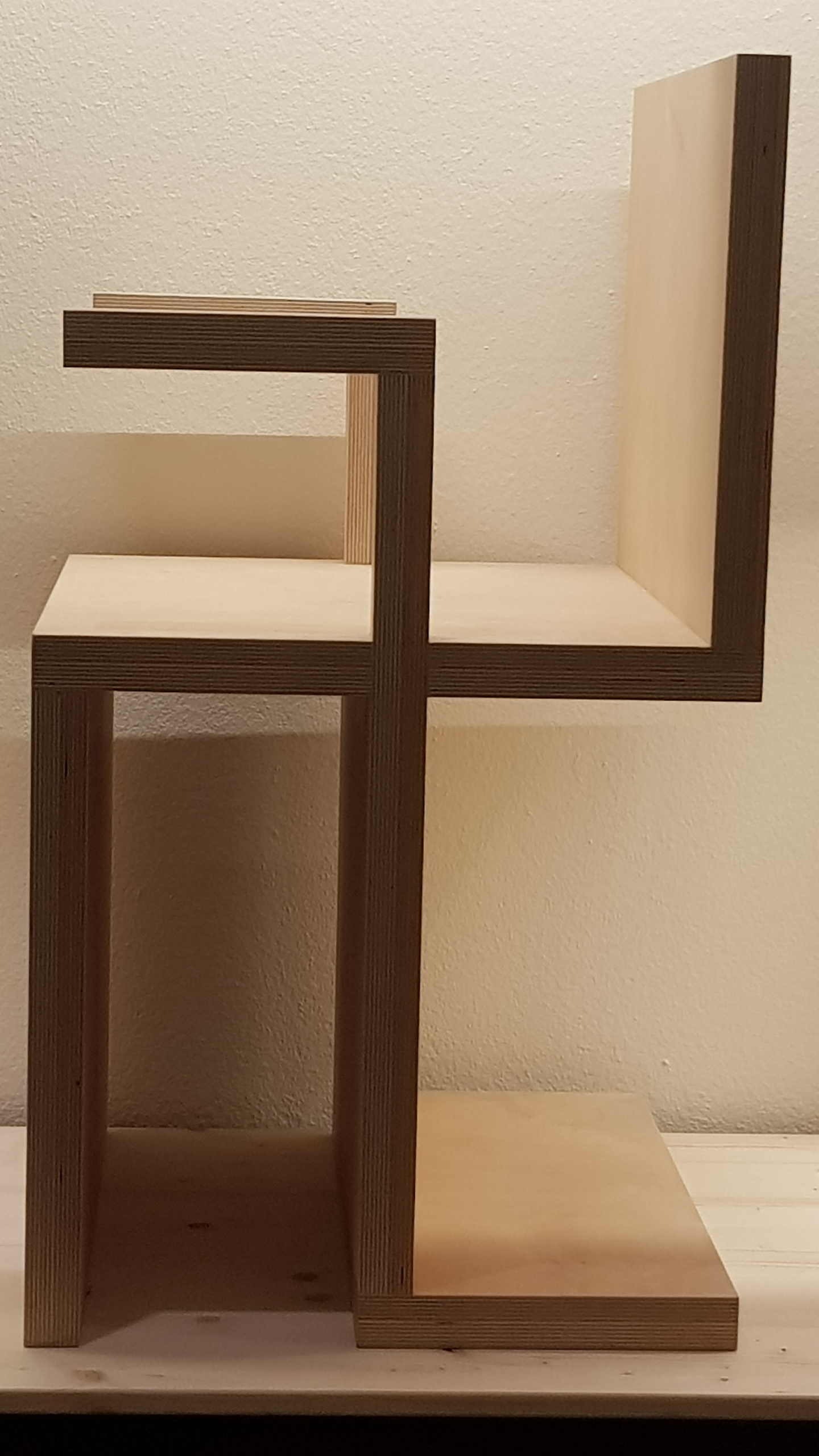
Uri Katzenstein exhibition, "The Institute of Ongoing Things", at the Joods Historisch Museum in Amsterdam, January 2019

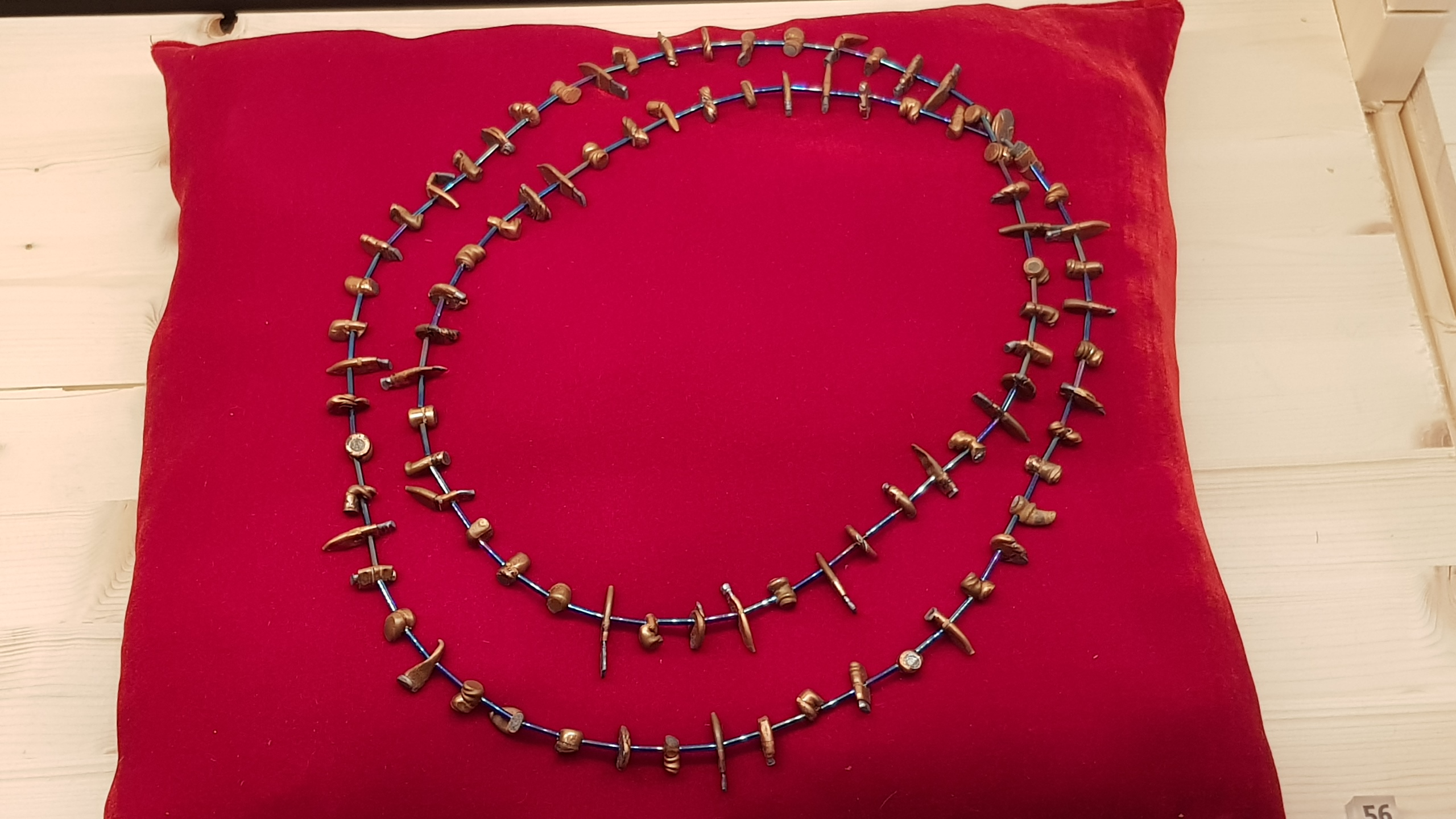
Uri Katzenstein exhibition, "The Institute of Ongoing Things", at the Joods Historisch Museum in Amsterdam, January 2019
