= St. Grigor Church (Gal) =

Armenian church in Nakhchivan, Azerbaijan

- Սուրբ Գրիգոր եկեղեցի
- St. Grigor Church
- Location: Gal, Azerbaijan
- Country: Azerbaijan
- Denomination: Armenian Apostolic Church

History
- Status: Destroyed
- Founded: 12-13th centuries

Architecture
- Style: Basilica
- Demolished: 1997–2001

St. Grigor Church was an Armenian church located in the village of Gal (Julfa District) of the Nakhchivan Autonomous Republic of Azerbaijan. The church was located in the center of the village.

== History ==
The church was probably founded in the 12–13th centuries. It was rebuilt 1658–1659.

== Architecture ==
St. Grigor was a basilica with cruciform roof and consisted of a nave and two aisles, a seven-sided apse with two-storied vestries on either side, and a porch in the west. Four pillars supported the roof and cupola. There was an Armenian inscription on the western facade.

== Destruction ==
The church was still a well-preserved monument in the late Soviet period, however it was destroyed at some point between 1997 and October 7, 2001, as documented by investigation of the Caucasus Heritage Watch.
