= Hal, Azerbaijan =

Hal
- Location within Azerbaijan
- Coordinates: 39°16′29″N 46°40′34″E
- Country: Azerbaijan
- District: Qubadli

Population (2015)
  - Total: 32
- Time zone: UTC+4 (AZT)

Hal is a village in the Qubadli District of Azerbaijan.

== History ==
The village was located in the Armenian-occupied territories surrounding Nagorno-Karabakh, coming under the control of ethnic Armenian forces during the First Nagorno-Karabakh War in the early 1990s. The village subsequently became part of the breakaway Republic of Artsakh as part of its Kashatagh Province, referred to as Hale (Armenian: Հալե). It was returned to Azerbaijan as part of the 2020 Nagorno-Karabakh ceasefire agreement.
