= GALS screen =

Medical examination to detect locomotor abnormalities

- Purpose: detect locomotor abnormalities

A GALS screen is an examination used by doctors and other healthcare professionals to detect locomotor abnormalities and functional disability relating to gait, arms, legs and the spine.

== Examination ==
Gait

Ask the patient to walk a short distance, turn and then walk back.

Observation: looking for symmetry, smoothness of movement, normal stride length, pelvic tilt, arm swing, normal heel strike, stance, toe-off, swing through and ability to turn with ease. Note any antalgic, trendelenburg, hemiplegic or parkinsonian gait features.

Arms, legs and spine

From behind

Inspect for: a straight spine (note any scoliosis), normal paraspinal muscle bulk, symmetrical shoulder and gluteal muscle bulk, symmetry of iliac crests, absence of popliteal swellings, absence of foot or hindfoot swellings.

Palpate: over mid supraspinatus and roll the skin over the trapezius to test for signs of hyperalgesia or fibromyalgia.

From the side

Inspect for: normal cervical and lumbar lordosis and normal thoracic kyphosis. Whilst standing beside the patient place your index finger on one of the lumbar vertebral spinous processes, and your middle finger on the next one down and ask the patient to bend over and touch their toes, keeping their legs straight. Normally, as the patient bends, the spinous processes will move apart, so your fingers will move apart also. Note whether this is the case.

From the front

Inspect for: normal and symmetrical shoulder and quadriceps muscle bulk, no knee swellings, no deformity of mid or hind feet.

Now ask the patient to do the following noting any painful, restricted or asymmetrical movements:

Test rotation of the thoracic and lumbar spine. Gently hold the patient's hips still and ask them to: "Turn your shoulders round as far as you can to the left, then do the same to the right."

Test lateral flexion of the thoracic and lumbar spine: "Stand up straight and then slide the palm of your right hand down your thigh towards your knee, bending your shoulder down to the side." "Now do the same with your left hand down your left leg."

"Bend your left ear down towards your left shoulder and then your right ear down towards your right shoulder" to test for pain free cervical spine lateral flexion.

Now test for stiffness or pain flexing or extending the cervical spine: "bend your neck forwards to try to touch your chin against your chest." "bend your neck back to lift your chin."

"open your jaw and move it from side to side" to test for pain free normal temporo-mandibular joint movement.

"put your hands behind your head with your elbows as far back as they can go. Now try to touch the small of your back" to test for normal sterno-clavicular, gleno-humeral and acromio-clavicular joint movement.

"put your hands by your sides with your elbows straight" looking for full elbow extension.

"put your hands out in front of you with your palms down and fingers out straight" looking for ability to extend fingers, and inspecting for any swelling or deformity of the fingers or wrists.

"now turn your hands over" making sure that supination is normal (watch for external rotation of the shoulder to compensate for poor supination). Inspect the palms for any signs or swellings.

"now make a fist with both hands around my fingers and squeeze tightly" test the grip for normal and symmetrical power.

"place the tip of each finger onto the thumb" to test for fine precision pinch. You may also do a metacarpal squeeze at this point to test for metacarpal phalangeal tenderness.

Now lay the patient down.

For both legs compare true (ASIS to medial malleolus) and apparent (umbilicus to medial malleolus) leg length.

Ask the patient to:

"put your heel onto your bottom" to test knee flexion. Place your hand over the knee and then the hip joints feeling for crepitus as the patient moves these joints.

Now test internal rotation of the hip with the knee joint flexed to 90 degrees (moving the foot laterally with the knee flexed causes internal rotation of the hip joint - early OA causes pain and limitation of this movement).

Test for the balloon sign on the knees.

Inspect the soles of the feet for any calluses, or skin changes.

Squeeze the metatarsal joints to test for any tenderness.

The pGALS musculoskeletal assessment

pGALS (paediatric Gait Arms Legs and Spine) basic musculoskeletal assessment

• The pGALS assessment is a simple evidence-based approach to musculoskeletal assessment based on the adult GALS (Gait, Arms, Legs, Spine) screen and has been shown to have high sensitivity to detect significant abnormalities • pGALS is primarily aimed at the school aged child, but younger children will often comply with pGALS, especially if they copy the examiner and see this as a game. • pGALS incorporates a series of simple manoeuvres, takes an average of 2 minutes to perform and simple practical tips facilitate the examination (see free resources). • The pGALS screen includes three questions relating to pain and function although a negative response does not exclude significant musculoskeletal disease and at a minimum the screening examination should be done in all clinical scenarios where musculoskeletal disease is a concern. • It is essential to perform all parts of the pGALS screen as joint involvement may be apparently “asymptomatic, symptoms may not be localised, and it is important to check for verbal and non-verbal clues of joint discomfort such as facial expression or withdrawal of limb. • The information needs to be interpreted in the context of the physical examination elsewhere (e.g. chest, abdomen, neurological examinations in the case of the limping child or in the presence of any “red flags” in the unwell child. • Documentation of findings in the case notes is simple using a grid (see free resources)

pGALS – A basic musculoskeletal assessment for school-aged children - the questions and components of pGALS.

The pGALS screening questions ● Do you (or does your child) have any pain or stiffness in your joints, muscles or your back? ● Do you (or does your child) have any difficulty getting yourself dressed without any help? ● Do you (or does your child) have any difficulty going up and down stairs?

Gait ● Observe the child walking ● “Walk on your tip-toes / walk on your heels”

Arms ● “Put your hands out in front of you” ● “Turn your hands over and make a fist” ● “Pinch your index finger and thumb together” ● “Touch the tips of your fingers with your thumb” ● Squeeze the metacarpophalangeal joints ● “Put your hands together / put your hands back to back” ● “Reach up and touch the sky” ● “Look at the ceiling” ● “Put your hands behind your neck”

Legs ● Feel for effusion at the knee ● “Bend and then straighten your knee” (Active movement of knees and examiner feels for crepitus) ● Passive flexion (90 degrees) with internal rotation of hip

Spine ● “Open your mouth and put 3 of your (child’s own) fingers in your mouth” - to check for temporomandibular joint disease ● Lateral flexion of cervical spine – “Try and touch your shoulder with your ear” ● Observe the spine from behind ● “Can you bend and touch your toes?” Observe curve of the spine from side and behind

Further reading and resources Free educational resources (DVD to order, web streamed demo and handouts) to demonstrate pGALS and an explanation of the manoeuvres (and how to interpret them) are available.

http://www.arthritisresearchuk.org/health-professionals-and-students.aspx

== See also ==
- Hip examination
- Knee examination
