= Lesser Caucasus =

Main range of the Caucasus Mountains

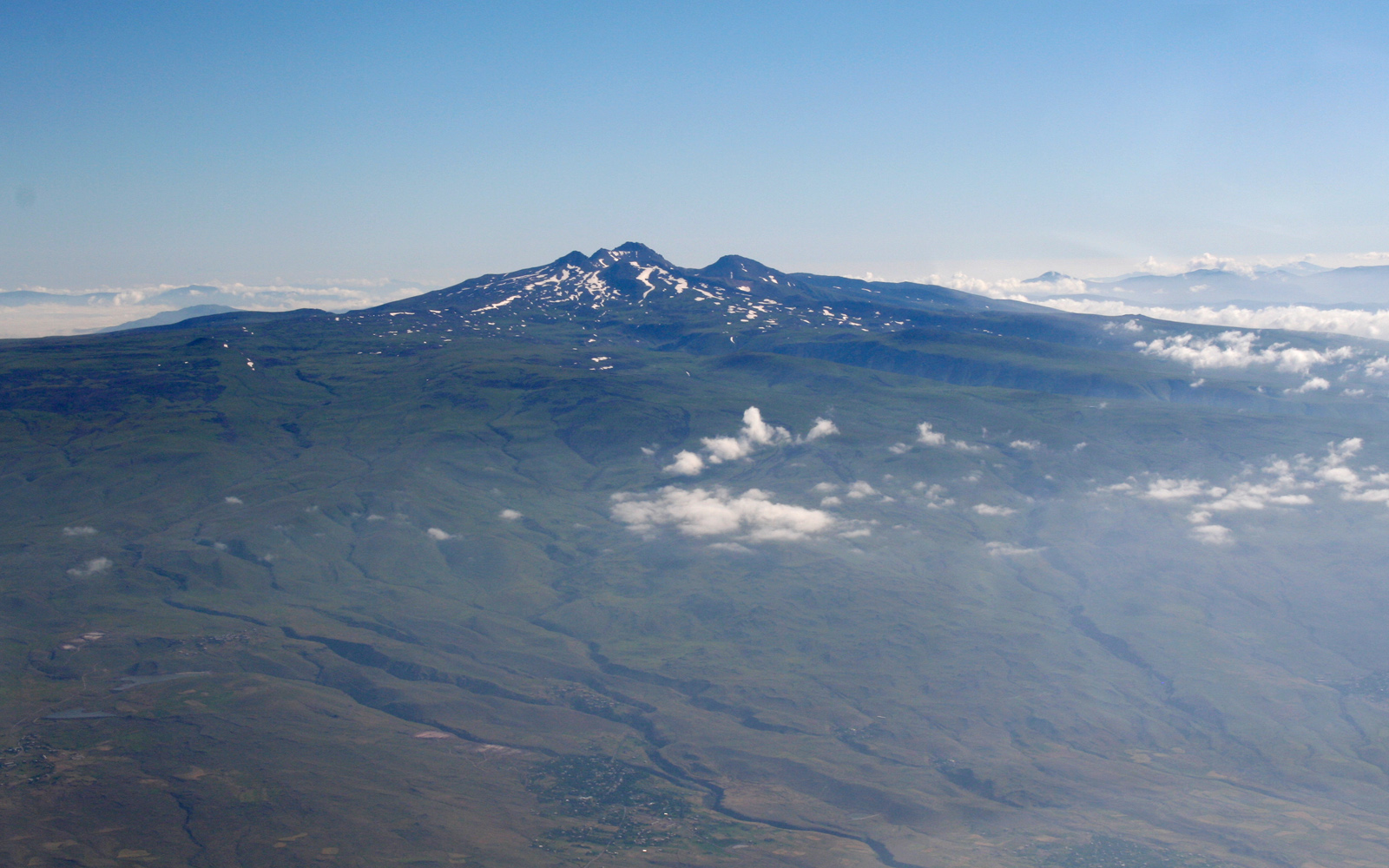
- Aragats mount in Armenia

Highest point
- Peak: Aragats
- Elevation: 4,090 m (13,420 ft)

Dimensions
- Length: 600 km (370 mi) NW-SE

Geography
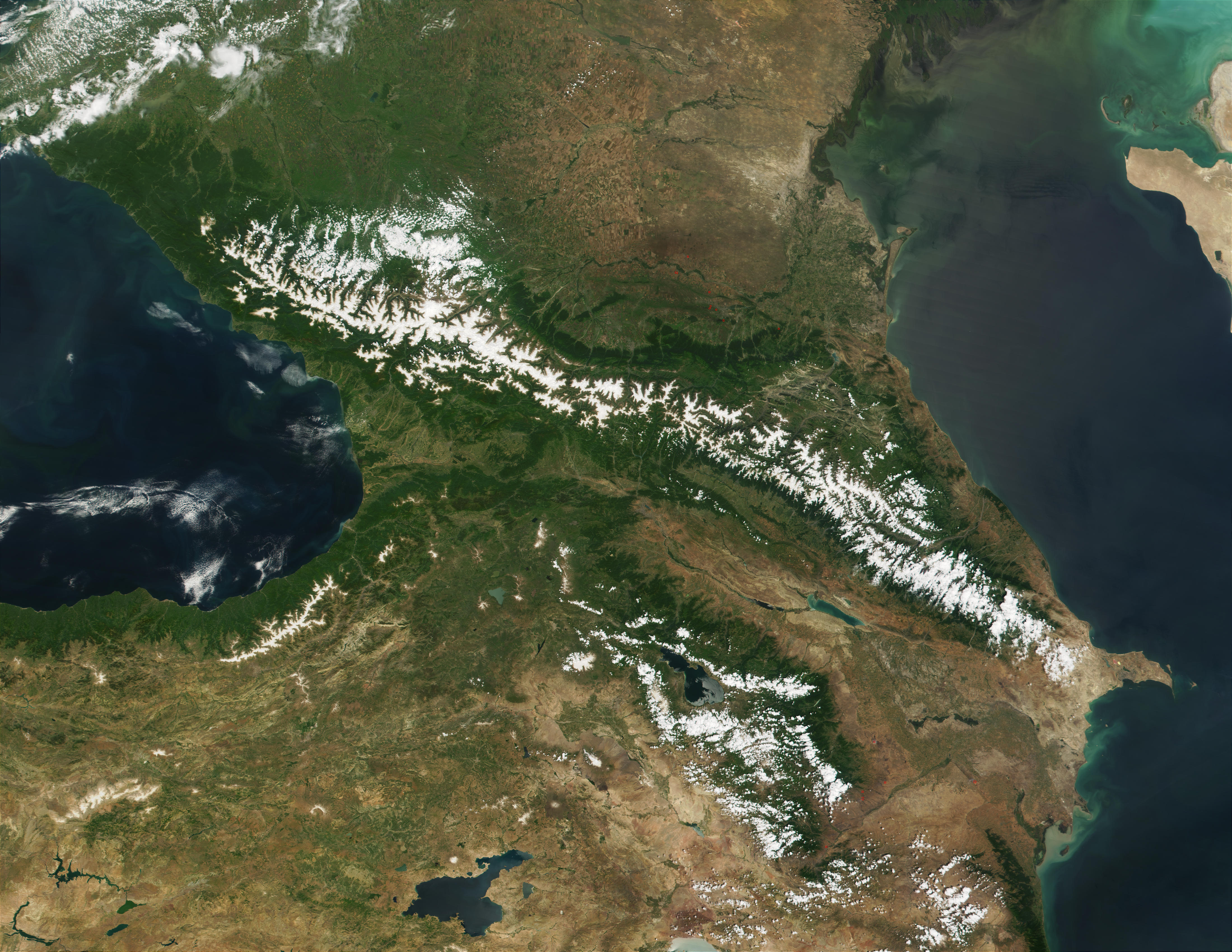
- Satellite image; the snowy mountains to the south are the Lesser Caucasus.
- Countries: Azerbaijan; Georgia; Armenia; Iran
- Range coordinates: 41°N 44°E
- Parent range: Caucasian / Armenian Highlands
- Borders on: Greater Caucasus

The Lesser Caucasus or Lesser Caucasus Mountains, also called Caucasus Minor, is the second of the two main ranges of the Caucasus Mountains, of length about 600 km (370 mi). The western portion of the Lesser Caucasus overlaps and converges with east Turkey and northwest Iran. It runs parallel to the Greater Caucasus, traversing through the Armenian highlands, at a distance averaging about 100 km (62 mi) south from the Likhi Range (Georgia), and limits east Turkey from the north and north-east. It is connected with the Pontic range and separated from it by the Kolkhida Lowland (Georgia) in the west and Kura-Aras Lowland (Azerbaijan) (by the Kura River) in the east.

== Description ==
The highest peak is Aragats in Armenia, 4,090 m (13,420 ft).

The borders between Georgia, Turkey, Armenia, Azerbaijan and Iran run through the range, although its crest does not usually define the border. The range was historically called Anticaucasus or Anti-Caucasus (Greek: Αντι-Καύκασος, Russian: Антикавка́з, Анти-Кавка́з). This usage is commonly found in older sources. Current usage tends towards using the name Lesser Caucasus, but Anti-caucasus can still be found in modern texts.

== See also ==
- Ark of Nuh or Noah
- İlandağ in Nakhchivan, Azerbaijan
