= Gol Chul =

Gol Chul گل چول
- Village
- Location within Iran
- Coordinates: 38°36′24″N 46°26′07″E
- Country: Iran
- Province: East Azerbaijan
- County: Varzaqan
- Bakhsh: Kharvana
- Rural District: Jushin

Population (2006)
  - Total: 172
- Time zone: UTC+3:30 (IRST)
  - Summer (DST): UTC+4:30 (IRDT)

Gol Chul (Persian: گل چول, also Romanized as Gol Chūl; also known as Gāl, Galoo, Galow, Galū, Geyāl, Giāl, Gyal, and Kalū) is a village in Jushin Rural District, Kharvana District, Varzaqan County, East Azerbaijan Province, Iran. At the 2006 census, its population was 172, in 33 families.
