= İlandağ =

Mountain in Julfa District, Azerbaijan

- Snake Mountain
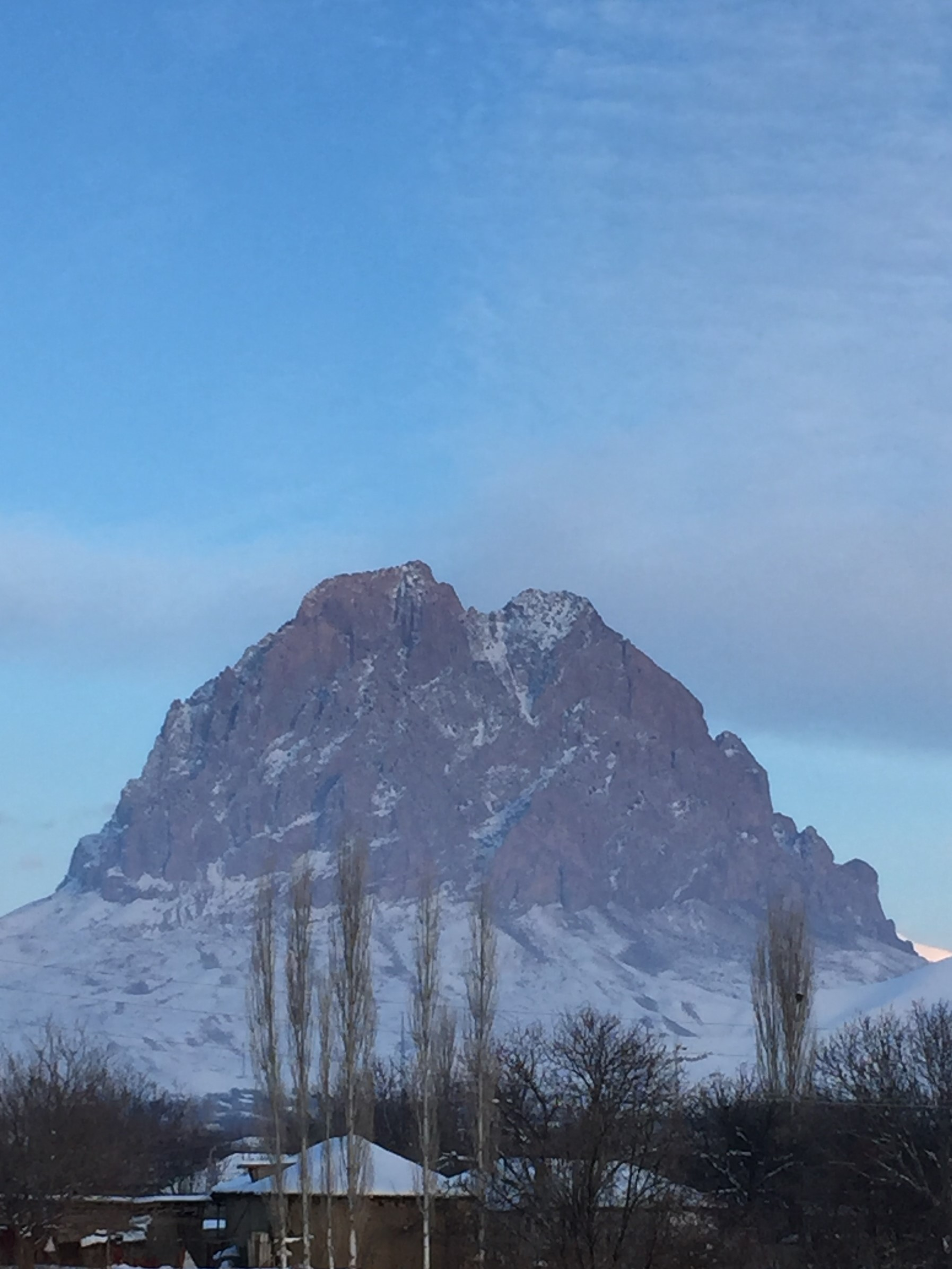

Highest point
- Elevation: 2,415 m (7,923 ft)
- Prominence: 1,043 m (3,422 ft)
- Listing: Highest peaks of Azerbaijan, Ribu
- Coordinates: 39°08′57″N 45°39′31″E

Geography
- Location within Caucasus Mountains Location within Azerbaijan Location within West and Central Asia
- Country: Azerbaijan
- District: Julfa
- Parent range: Lesser Caucasus

İlandağ is a mountain peak of the Lesser Caucasus range, located in the Julfa District of Nakhchivan, Azerbaijan. It has an elevation of 2,415 metres (7,923 ft) above sea level, which also is visible from Nakhchivan City. According to legend, the cleft in its summit was formed by the keel of Noah's Ark as the floodwaters abated.

== See also ==
- Mount Judi in southeast Anatolia, Turkey
- Mausoleum of Nuh or Noah
- The Sinjar Mountains in Nineveh Governorate, Iraq
