= Gal Weinstein =

Israeli installation artist (born 1970)

Gal Weinstein גל וינשטיין
- Born: 1970 (age 55–56); Ramat Gan, Israel
- Education: Bezalel Academy of Arts and Design
- Known for: Painting
- Movement: Israeli art

Gal Weinstein (Hebrew: גל וינשטיין) is an Israeli artist.

== Biography ==
Gal Weinstein, born 1970, Ramat Gan, Israel. Lives and works in Tel Aviv.

Weinstein represented Israel at the 57th Venice Biennale in 2017, exhibiting an immersive environment titled "Sun Stand Still." In 2022 his work was included in the 23rd Biennale of Sydney.

His 2009 work Nahalal, a depiction of a moshav northern Israel created in plywood and carpet, is in the collection of the Israel Museum in Jerusalem.
