= Sándor Gál =

Hungarian lawyer and politician

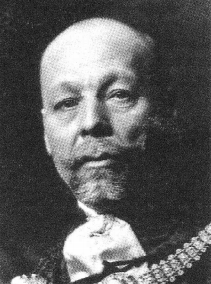

Speaker of the House of Representatives
- In office 13 November 1909 – 23 June 1910
- Preceded by: Gyula Justh
- Succeeded by: Albert Berzeviczy

Personal details
- Born: 13 December 1855 Gyergyóújfalu, Austria-Hungary (today: Suseni, Romania)
- Died: 4 September 1937 (aged 69) Reghin, Kingdom of Romania
- Party: Independence Party of 48; Constitution Party
- Profession: lawyer, politician

Sándor Gál (13 December 1855 – 4 September 1937) was a Hungarian lawyer and politician, who served as Speaker of the House of Representatives between 1909 and 1910.

Political offices
Preceded by Gyula Justh	Speaker of the House of Representatives; 1909–1910	Succeeded by Albert Berzeviczy
