= Gal, Azerbaijan =

Village and municipality in Nakhchivan, Azerbaijan

Gal
- Municipality
- Location within Azerbaijan
- Coordinates: 39°07′21″N 45°44′48″E
- Country: Azerbaijan
- Autonomous republic: Nakhchivan
- District: Julfa

Population (2005)
  - Total: 128
- Time zone: UTC+4 (AZT)

Gal (also, Qal, Gyal, Hal) or Gagh (Armenian: Գաղ, romanized: Gaġ) is a village and the least populous municipality in the Julfa District of Nakhchivan, Azerbaijan. It is located 20 km in the north from the district center, on the slope of the Ilandagh Mountain. Its population is busy with farming and animal husbandry. There are secondary school, cultural house, library, communication branch, and a medical center in the village. The İlandağ (Ilandagh) settlement of the Middle Ages was registered in the north-east of the village. It has a population of 128.

== Historical and archaeological monuments ==
=== İlandağ (Ilandagh) ===
İlandağ (Ilandagh) -The mountain -nature monument in the left valley of the Alinjachay, in the territory of Julfa r. The first component is linked with the old mythic God Anun and the second component year "land" expressing "Tanri yurdu" (The Land of God). Height 2415 m. Appeared as a result of volcano (magma) eruption, contains andesit-dacit content deposits. Precipitous slopy. Poor mountainous plant cover. Possesses xerophit bushy and dry field landscape. Popular as Hachadagh (Forked mountain) among people. Two paths lead up Ilandagh. These paths join with the place named Yahardagh (Saddle mountain). From the very Yahar a path goes up to both forks. The place where the paths from Old Khoshkeshin and Gal direction join one can vividly see the traces of construction. This defence system built of stones putting one over another destroyed as the building was constructed out of clay, lime solution, mud etc. To the right direction high rocks remembering wall are standing upright. Inside of the undestroyed wall-fence there are the remnants of the settlement houses 10-12 m2 in capacity (perhaps it was a "headquarter" of defenders, the wall is one layer in the n. and in the center, but in the s. three layers. While climbing the top one can see the walls of cyclopean construction in 7 places (height 10–15 m). There is a thick clay coat between the Middle Ages on the top of Ilanli. Clay pieces about the Middle Ages were discovered inside the clay in a fire-place. Observations prove that there was an old guard station in Ilanli mountain; about the expected danger they gave signals at night by fire and day times by means of smoke signals to Alinjagala, Gazanchi, Berdi, Suzut, Babek, Pilapan, Dashgala, Chalkhan gala, Shahbuzgala, Oglangala and other fortresses in advance. For the old Shumer legend the ark of prophet Noah besides Gamigaya touches on another mountain top and rocks very strongly when sailing. This time prophet Noah said: "Trust in, a mountain". The name "Inan dagh" (Trust in, a mountain) is supposed from this version. Later on Inandagh became as Ilandagh (Elandagh) in the people's understanding. Ilandagh differed from the mountains and hills around, so its magnificence and mightiness also has become a symbol of invincibility, highness for Nakhchivan region. In a romantic legend this mountain is similared with the helmet of an invincible leader decorated with pearls which fell down from his head. In the second legend Ilandagh is constructed as "Alin daghi" (Stain on forehead). Being divided into two after a heavy stroke of Noah's ark and reflecting an unstained wide forehead of Nakhchivan's past today and tomorrow that has been written as it yes in a blank paper in form of a miracle line. Starting from 2001, every year on May 9–10 a march of public is held to the top of Ilandagh in honour of Heydar Aliyev, national leader of the Azerbaijan people. The goal of this march is to visit the gorelief of Heydar Aliyev erected on the top of Ilandagh and renew the flag of the Azerbaijan Republic waving on the top.

=== St. Grigor Church ===
St. Grigor Church was a 12-13th century Armenian church located in the central part of the village and was destroyed at some point between 1997 and 2001.

== Notable people ==
- Abel Gaghetsi (Armenian: Աբել Գաղեցի, romanized: Abel of Gagh), Armenian writer from the 16th century. Gaghetsi published his manuscripts, which he called the "Lectionary", in a rare Latin version of the Armenian alphabet and published them in Florence, Tuscany in 1571 AD.

== See also ==
- St. Grigor Church (Gal)
