= Anarchism in Austria-Hungary =

Anarchism in Austria-Hungary may refer to a number of anarchist movements in the former territory of Austria-Hungary:

- Anarchism in Austria
- Anarchism in Bosnia and Herzegovina
- Anarchism in Croatia
- Anarchism in the Czech Republic
- Anarchism in Hungary
