= Anarchism in Austria =

Anarchism in Austria first developed from the anarchist segments of the International Workingmen's Association (IWA), eventually growing into a nationwide anarcho-syndicalist movement that reached its height during the 1920s. Following the institution of fascism in Austria and the subsequent war, the anarchist movement was slow to recover, eventually reconstituting anarcho-syndicalism by the 1990s.

== History ==
Following the establishment of the First French Empire in 1804, the Holy Roman Emperor Francis II proclaimed the establishment of the Austrian Empire under the rule of the Habsburg monarchy. Following the Austrian defeat at the Battle of Austerlitz in 1806, the Holy Roman Empire was dissolved and replaced with the Confederation of the Rhine, a French client state. In 1813, this too was dissolved in the wake of the French defeat at the Battle of Leipzig and in the ensuing German campaign, Austria united with a number of German states as part of the German Confederation, though it retained rule over territories outside of the confederation - in Hungary, Croatia, Bohemia, Galicia–Lodomeria and Lombardy–Venetia.

=== Emergence of socialism and anarchism ===
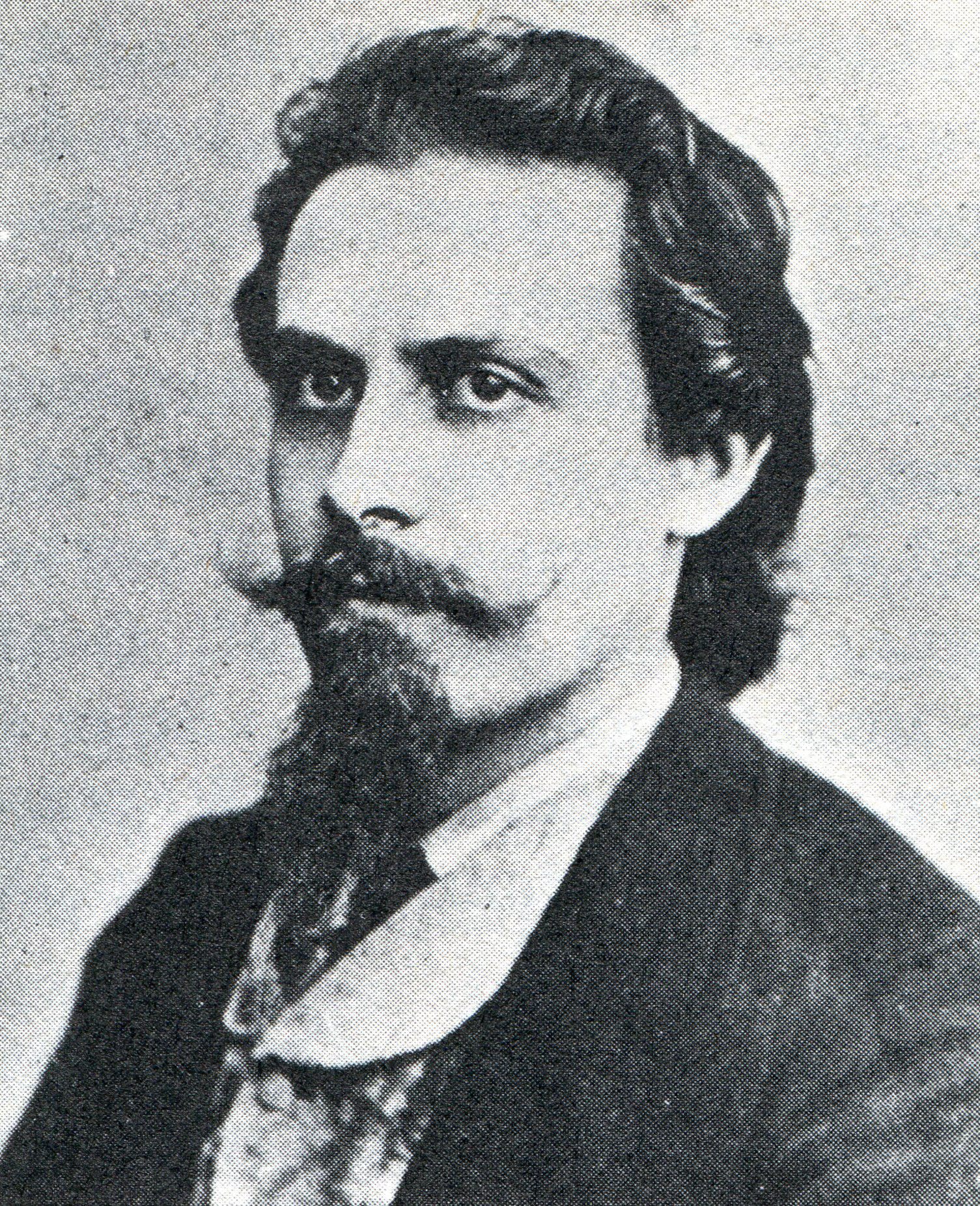
Andreas Scheu, an early leader of the Austrian anarchist movement.

During the Revolutions of 1848, liberal, nationalist and left-wing ideas rose to prominence throughout the Austrian Empire, resulting in a number of revolts against the central state in order to achieve independence and representative democracy. The young Mikhail Bakunin had attempted to aid the pan-slavist movements in the Austrian territories of Czechia, Ruthenia and Poland, organizing an attempted revolution to overthrow Austrian rule. But Bakunin was captured by the Austrian authorities and eventually handed over to the Russian Empire. Despite some minor concessions, the suppression of the revolutions generated a hatred of Austrian despotism by the working classes - with one general of the counter-revolution Julius Jacob von Haynau being physically attacked by brewery workers upon a visit to London in 1850.

The economic crisis brought on by the Panic of 1857 and the political crisis brought on by the Austro-Sardinian War led to the spread of class consciousness among the Austrian working classes, culminating in the 1860s with the establishment of the International Workingmen's Association (IWA). A number of radical new schools of thought began to propagate throughout Austria, including the socialist tendencies of anarchism, syndicalism and social democracy, as well as liberal tendencies such as individualism, laissez-faire capitalism and the Austrian School of economics.

The new emperor Franz Joseph I spent his early years resisting the rise of reformist sentiments, but following the Austrian defeat in the Seven Week's War which excluded Austria from the German Confederation, he eventually conceded to the Austro-Hungarian Compromise of 1867, transforming the empire into the constitutional dual monarchy of Austria-Hungary. The country's largely agricultural economy then underwent an industrial revolution, accelerating the country's transformation into a capitalist economy. By this time the IWA had already spread to Austria, with nearly all of the individual workers' organizations in the country adhering to the international.

By 1869, a more tightly organized workers' movement had emerged from an Austrian branch of the Social Democratic Workers' Party of Germany (SDAP). Despite the fact that the international was not able to pursue its activities legally in Austria, due to a law which prohibited internationalism, by the time of the SDAP's foundation the IWA already counted 13,350 members in Austria - with 10,000 hailing solely from Vienna. The Austrian section sent two delegates, Neumayer and Oberwinder, to the IWA's Basel Congress and continued to grow despite the domestic repression against it. By 1870, the Austrian section of the IWA had around 50,000 members, with some French lawyers even estimating the number to be as high as 100,000.

=== Radicalization and repression ===
Following the split in the International between the Marxists and the anarchists, the Austrian workers' movement was torn apart, as workers gravitated either towards the anarchist camp (led by Andreas Scheu) or the moderate social-democratic camp (led by Heinrich Oberwinder), with Marx's General Council completely losing its influence in Austria. In the wake of this division, the Austrian government began to severely repress the radical anarchist movement, while leaving the moderate social-democrats largely unmolested - allowing it to outgrow the anarchists. In 1874, the social democratic camp made moves toward the establishment of a political party, culminating with the foundation of the Social Democratic Party of Austria. Many in the anarchist camp, facing harassment by the government, were forced into exile in London, where they made contact with other socialist immigrants, collaborated on Johann Most's Freiheit paper and joined the Social Democratic Federation - with the anarchist section later splitting to found the Socialist League.

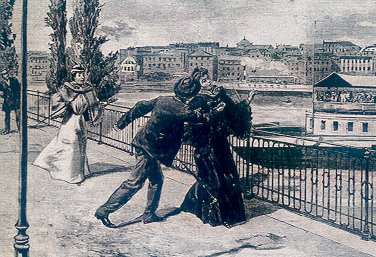
An artist's rendition of the assassination of Empress Elisabeth by the Italian anarchist Luigi Lucheni in Geneva, 10 September 1898.

The remaining anarchists in Austria found themselves completely unable to organize within the workers' movement, due to the severe repression levelled against them by the Austrian government. This repression, coupled with the influx of the more militant ideas of Freiheit such as propaganda of the deed, radicalized many previously moderate anarchists towards terrorism. Anarchist militants began to carry out acts of violence against the upper classes and police officers, expropriations for the redistribution of wealth and a number of spontaneous uprisings in Vienna throughout the 1890s. In 1898, Empress Elisabeth of Austria was assassinated in Geneva by the Italian anarchist Luigi Lucheni. Despite acting alone, conspiracy theories that Lucheni was part of a plot to assassinate the Emperor spread throughout the empire, with reprisals being threatened against Italians in Vienna. This radical nature of anarchism at the time drove more workers towards the Social Democratic Party which, following the implementation of universal manhood suffrage, was elected to the Imperial Council with nearly one quarter of the vote.

=== The rise of syndicalism ===
Nevertheless, anarchists began to once again organize within the workers' movement and the anarcho-syndicalist movement began to grow in Austria at the turn of 20th century. Independent trade unions spread throughout the country, organizing thousands of members of each trade, the most radical of which was the shoemakers' union - which developed strong anarchist tendencies. In 1904, the newspaper Generalstreik was first published in Vienna, becoming one of the first explicitly anarcho-syndicalist publications. The rise in anarchist sentiment within trade unions culminated with the foundation of the General Trade Union Federation of Austria, organized along anarcho-syndicalist lines. However, workers of the time largely remained conservative social-democrats, and thus the revolutionary syndicalist movement was only able to organize limited groups of workers.

Following a general strike in 1907, universal suffrage was finally granted and in the subsequent election, the Social Democrats saw a large increase in the share of seats and became one of the most powerful parties in the Parliament. But with these electoral gains also came a disillusionment with parliamentarism among the working classes, some of whom again began to gravitate towards anarchism. That same year, the German-language anarcho-communist newspaper Welfare for All began to be published on a fortnightly basis, reinvigorating interest in the anarchist movement and becoming the chief suppliers of anarchist literature throughout the German-speaking countries. Austrian anarchists of this period were largely anarcho-communists, influenced by Peter Kropotkin and Elisee Reclus, but also developed a notable Christian anarchist tendency inspired by Leo Tolstoy, in order to contend with the deep penetration of Catholicism in the country.

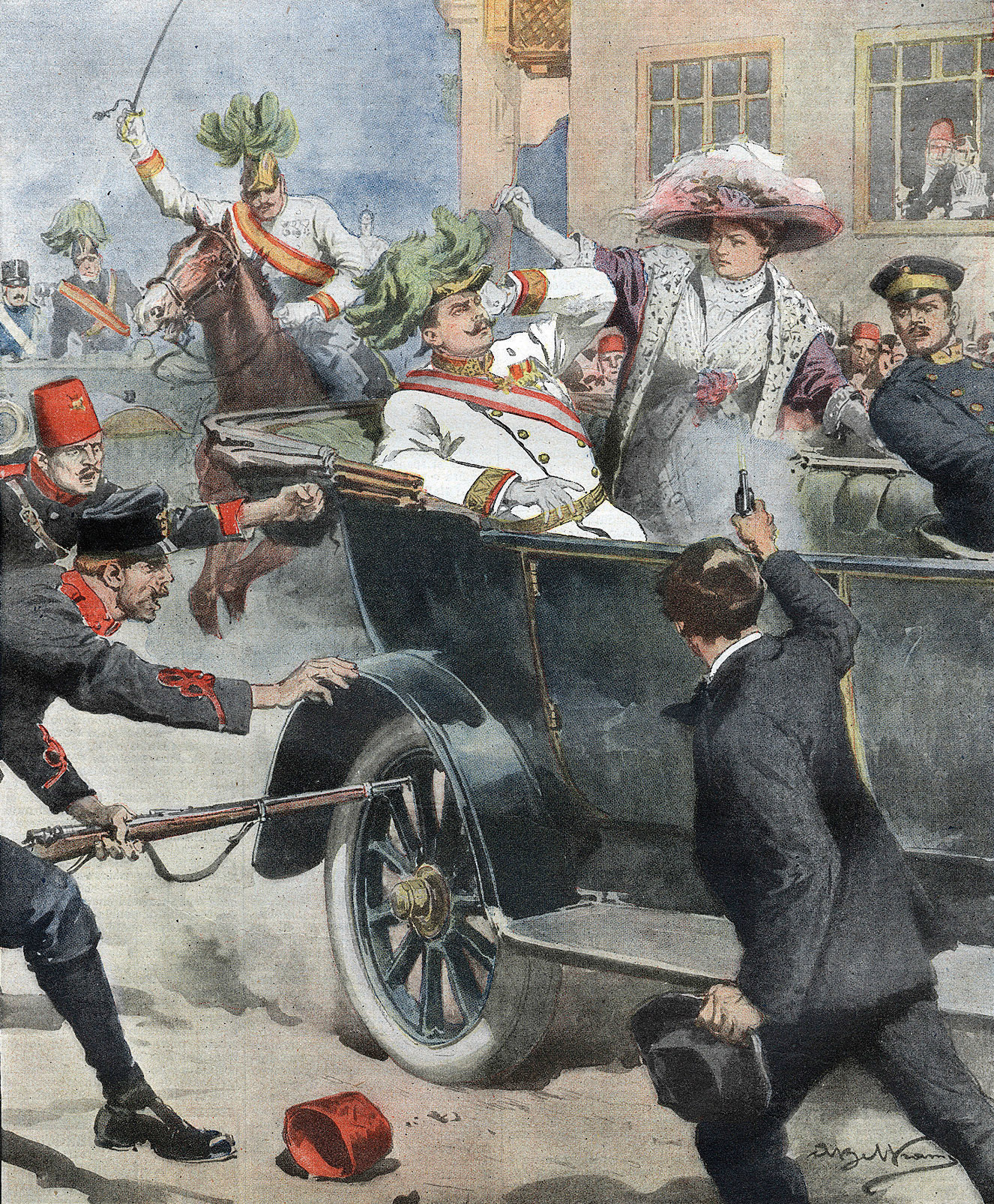
Gavrilo Princip assassinating Archduke Franz Ferdinand of Austria in Sarajevo.

On 28 June 1914, members of Young Bosnia carried out the assassination of Archduke Franz Ferdinand of Austria, inspired by the anarchist conception of propaganda of the deed. This act of "tyrannicide" triggered a series of events that eventually spiralled into World War I, beginning with the invasion of Serbia by Austria Hungary and their fellow Central Powers. Anarchists organized an anti-militarist resistance in response to the war's outbreak, encouraging people to refuse to do military service. One of the anarchists that refused was Pierre Ramus, who spent most of the war either in prison or under house arrest. The Social Democrats initially supported the Austrian entry into the war, despite having made anti-militarist statements in the past.

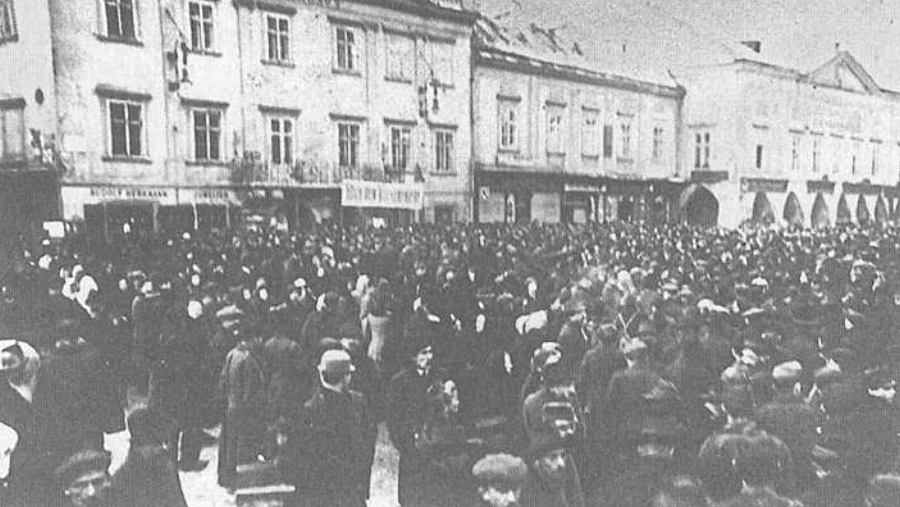
Striking workers assembling in Wiener Neustadt.

By 1917, as the war reached its apex, workers' strikes became increasingly more common, especially among women who were now playing a large role in manufacturing. Anarcho-syndicalists such as Leo Rothziegel held a strong influence in the workers' movement of the time, encouraging the formation of workers' councils and the organization of a general strike. This strike movement peaked on 14 January 1918, when the flour ration was halved and a spontaneous wildcat strike spread throughout the country, as thousands of locomotive workers put down their tools. This quickly evolved into a general strike, as hundreds of thousands of Viennese workers joined and workers' councils were established in order to coordinate the strike through participatory democracy. When the government promised to reform war benefits, establish a food service and democratize municipal election law, the workers' councils called off the strike and workers returned to work on 21 January. In the wake of the general strike, more actions followed, including strikes, factory occupations and the formation of workers' councils - with over 800,000 workers taking part in elections to these councils. The workers movement in Austria during 1918 played a decisive role in bringing the Austrian participation in the conflict to an end.

=== The inter-war political conflict ===
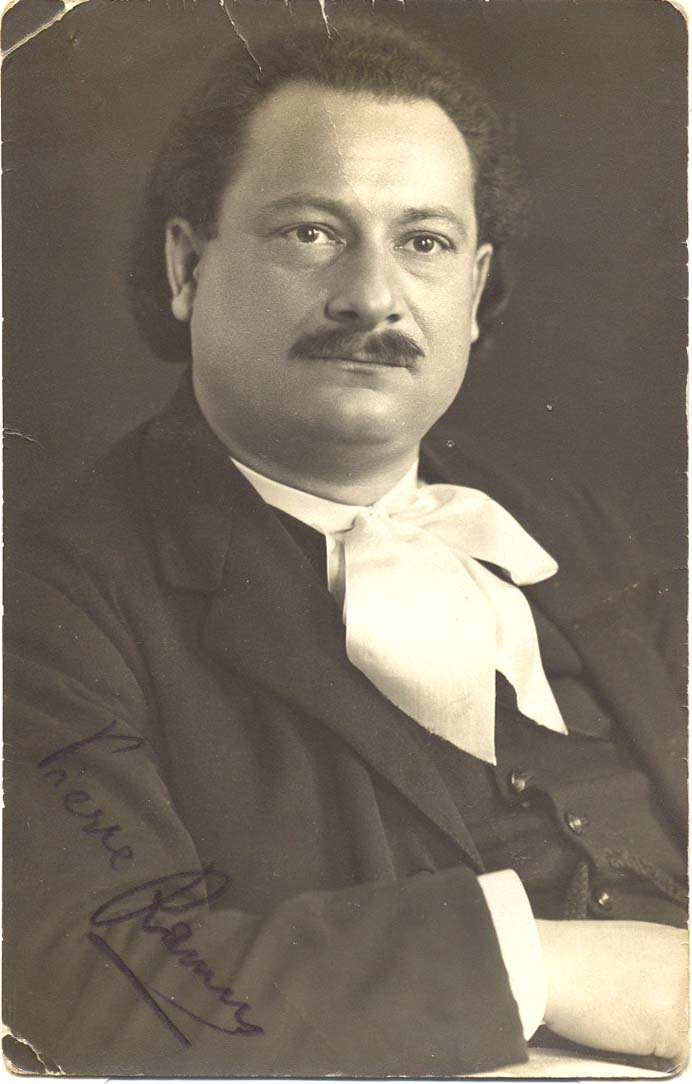
Pierre Ramus, a leader of the Austrian anarcho-syndicalist movement and founder of the Bund herrschaftsloser Sozialisten (BhS).

Following the Armistice of 11 November 1918, the emperor Charles I abdicated and the Austro-Hungarian Empire dissolved into a number of different nation-states. In German-Austria, elections were subsequently held with women's suffrage and the Social Democratic Party emerged as the largest party, overseeing the Treaty of Saint-Germain-en-Laye with the Entente Powers and the creation of the First Austrian Republic. In the newly founded republic, Pierre Ramus established the League of Dominationless Socialists (German: Bund herrschaftsloser Sozialisten, BhS), which quickly gained popularity, declaring:

All who represent a constructive concept of socialism and want to create the latter through mental clarity and practical action in the sense of realization; all who want to free themselves from the errors of any authoritarian socialism or state socialist direction and their dictatorial goals of rule and doctrine of violence; all who represent the principle of antimilitarism in their attitudes and conduct of life; All who deny the state principle of rulership and instead strive for a community of free individualities based on solidarity - they are all cordially invited to become members of the League of Dominant Socialists.

Following the defeat of the Hungarian Soviet Republic, the workers' councils movement in Austria was no longer able to assert itself against the state, and the growth of the anarcho-syndicalist movement ran into difficulties due to the rise of Bolshevism. Workers subsequently began to join the nascent Communist Party which competed with the Social Democrats for status as the vanguard, despite both ostensibly being Marxists in orientation. In 1920, the Social Democrats lost election to the right-wing Christian Social Party (CSP). Throughout the 1920s, political tensions in Austria heightened, as paramilitary groups began to operate throughout the country. The Home Guard, was established by demobilised soldiers initially to defend the borders of the new country, but over that time gravitated towards far-right nationalist politics and eventually became the de facto paramilitary wing of the CSP. In the face of the further radicalization of the Austrian right-wing, the Social Democrats established the Republican Protection League in order to defend themselves from the Home Guard. The Social Democrats, now locked in opposition, also began to pull ideas from anarchist theory - establishing a workers' bank along the lines of the mutualism proposed by Pierre-Joseph Proudhon.

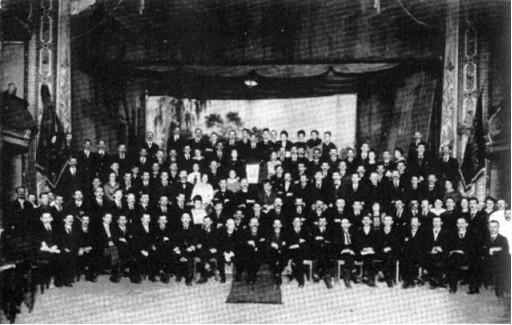
1922 congress of the Free Workers' Union (FAU), which operated in Austria during the late 1920s and early 1930s.

Anarcho-syndicalists maintained a consistent criticism of the communist and social democratic controlled workers' associations - which they perceived as a way of maintaining workers' discipline by the politicians. The workers' movement consequently became subordinated to the cause of conquering parliamentary power by political parties. In contrast, the anarcho-syndicalist organizations were able to organize strikes for higher wages, anti-militarist demonstrations and independent trade unions. Despite the difficulties posed by the Communists and Social Democrats, the anarcho-syndicalist movement more than tripled in size. In 1921 an anarcho-syndicalist congress was held in Innsbruck and, a few years later, Austrian anarcho-syndicalists affiliated to the IWA-AIT. By 1925, the BhS had grown to 4,000 dues-paying members organized into more than 60 local groups all around Austria, and its organ Knowledge and Liberation was distributed throughout all the major cities and towns in the country. But the BhS, under the leadership of Ramus, eventually developed away from anarcho-syndicalism and towards a reformist position based on co-operative economics. In response, an anarcho-syndicalist group of 30 to 40 people established an Austrian branch of the Free Workers' Union (FAU) and distributed the anarcho-syndicalist newspapers Der Freie Arbeiter and Der Syndikalist throughout Austria. The Austrian FAU most notably organized a taxi drivers' union, which had 120 registered members and 1200 subscribers to its newspaper Der Taxichauffeur. However, this union too lost its anarcho-syndicalist character over time, appearing to take on a social democratic position and even making anti-semitic attacks against trucking entrepreneurs. The remaining anarcho-syndicalist movement in Vienna continued to see a number of small victories, such as a successful wildcat strike in a café.

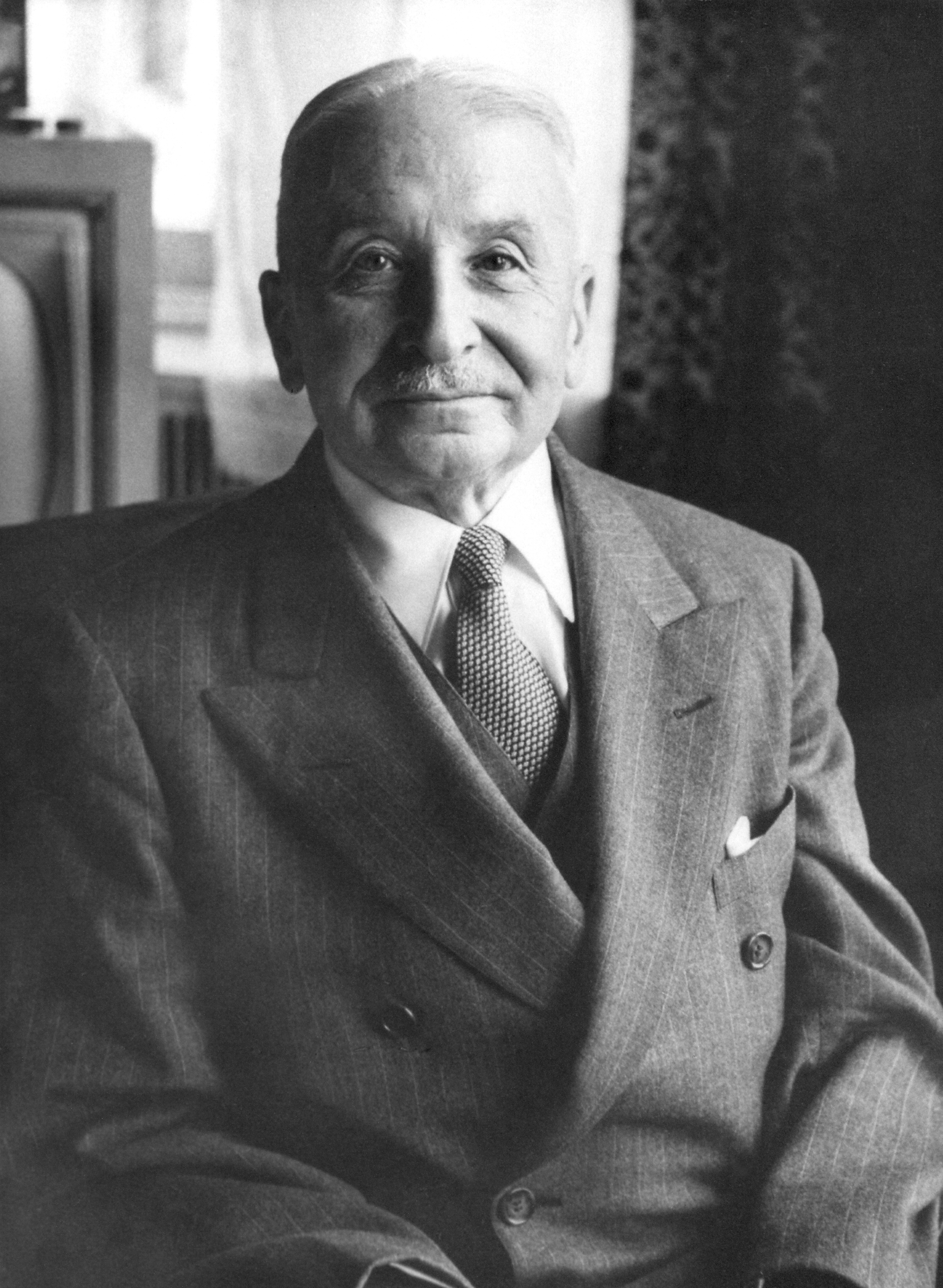
Ludwig von Mises, chief economist of the Austrofascist regime and central figure in the Austrian School of economics.

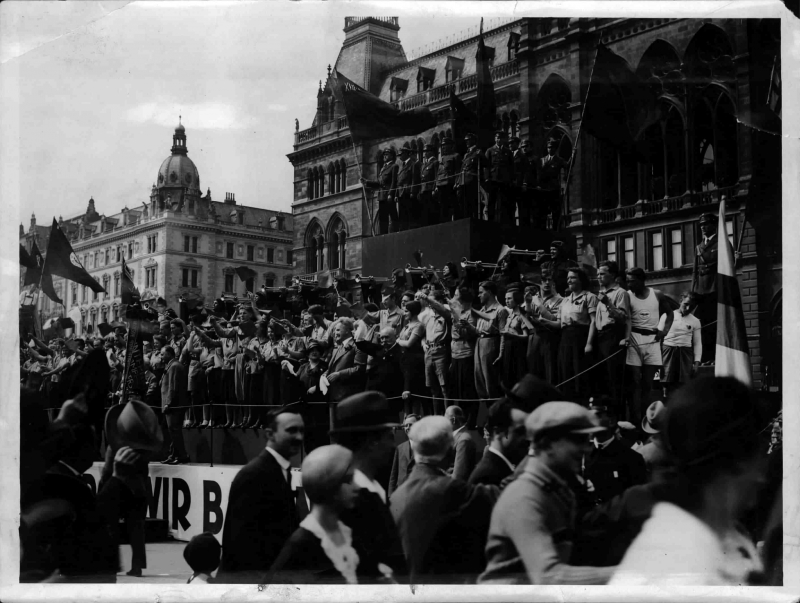
Left-wing activists celebrating International Workers' Day in Vienna, weeks before the rise of fascism to power in Austria.

In 1932, the Austrofascist Engelbert Dollfuss was appointed as Chancellor, at the head of a broad right-wing coalition government with only a one-vote majority in Parliament. In order to tackle the problems of the Great Depression, the new government undertook an economic restructuring, closely advised by the chief of chamber of commerce - the Austrian School economist Ludwig von Mises. The government also implemented repressive social policy, immediately banning all conventions by opposition parties - both left and right wing. Government repression intensified following the "Self-elimination of the Austrian Parliament", which granted Dolfuss the means to rule by decree and establish a fascist dictatorship. Dolfuss merged the right-wing political parties into the Fatherland Front and banned all opposition parties, transforming Austria into a one-party state. Vice-chancellor Emil Fey oversaw the subsequent suppression of the Austrian left-wing, arresting a number of socialist, communist and anarchist political figures, including Pierre Ramus - who later escaped to Switzerland. The tensions between the Austrian left-wing and the ruling government eventually erupted into the Austrian Civil War, which resulted in the de facto elimination of any organized left-wing movement and the consolidation of power by the government - culminating in the establishment of the Federal State of Austria, founded under a fascist constitution. Soon after, an attempted coup by the Austrian Nazi Party resulted in the assassination of Dolfuss, who was succeeded as Chancellor by Kurt Schuschnigg. Ludwig von Mises left the country shortly after the putsch, going first to Switzerland and then on to the United States, where he became a key influence on Murray Rothbard - the founder of anarcho-capitalism.

In the wake of the Spanish Revolution of 1936, libertarian sentiments began to flare up again. The anarcho-syndicalist movement, which had been continuing to organize underground, published a number of leaflets inspired by the revolution, even at risk of capture by the dictatorship. Following the Nazi invasion of Austria in 1938, underground anarchist groups even published a few diatribes against Hitler and Nazism, but the consolidation of fascism over Austria and the subsequent war resulted in the anarchist movement going temporarily into remission.

=== Post-war period ===
After the war, the anarchist movement experienced a rejuvenation, mainly adhering to the cooperativist line taken by Ramus in his later years, with a number of diverse anarchist groups also constituting, gaining a foothold in the state of Styria. An anarcho-syndicalist group in Hietzing, the Hietzinger Revolutionary Socialists and Anarchists, even managed to ensure a continuity between the inter-war and post-war anarchist movements. The countercultural movement of the 1970s and the ecology movement of the 1980s brought about a broader revival of anarchist movement in Austria, especially that of the cooperativist tendency, which was notably taken up by the Viennese Anarchist Group. By the 1990s, a number of autonomous groups had formed throughout the country, notably the social anarchist Revolutionsbräuhof group in Vienna.

In 1993, the Free Workers' Union (FAU) was reconstituted at the initiative of a small group in Vienna, organizing a congress and a "Libertarian Days" event in the city. During the 1990s, the FAU was involved in two wildcat strikes at a Billa warehouse in Wiener Neudorf, due to a dispute between the management and the workforce - which primarily consisted of Kurdish and Turkish immigrant workers. After the formation of the "BILLA Protest Initiative" by around 80 people, improved working conditions were secured by the striking workers. However, the Vienna FAU would end up dissolving following the withdrawal of its founder Adi Rasworschegg. Other initiatives were made to reestablish the FAU in Vienna, as well as in Upper Austria and Vorarlberg, but none of these groups lasted long. The anarcho-syndicalist movement would eventually be carried into the 21st century with the establishment of the Allgemeinen Syndikat Wiens, which has organized trade unions in the social work and education sectors. This was followed by the establishment of a syndicate in Upper Austria and subsequently a nationwide anarcho-syndicalist federation.

=== Contemporary movement ===
On 7 July 2021, around twenty activists of the anarcha-feminist group Alerta Feminista stormed the offices of the conservative tabloid Oe24, in protest against what they described as the "racist reporting" on the newspaper's website. They distributed leaflets and allegedly attacked Oe24 employees, although there were no injuries reported, later fleeing the scene following the arrival of the police.

== See also ==
- Category:Austrian anarchists
- List of anarchist movements by region
- Anarchism in Bosnia and Herzegovina
- Anarchism in Croatia
- Anarchism in the Czech Republic
- Anarchism in Germany
- Anarchism in Hungary
- Anarchism in Italy
- Anarchism in Switzerland
- Austrian School
- Liberalism in Austria
