= József Illésházy =

Hungarian noble, politician (1700–1766)

Count József Illésházy
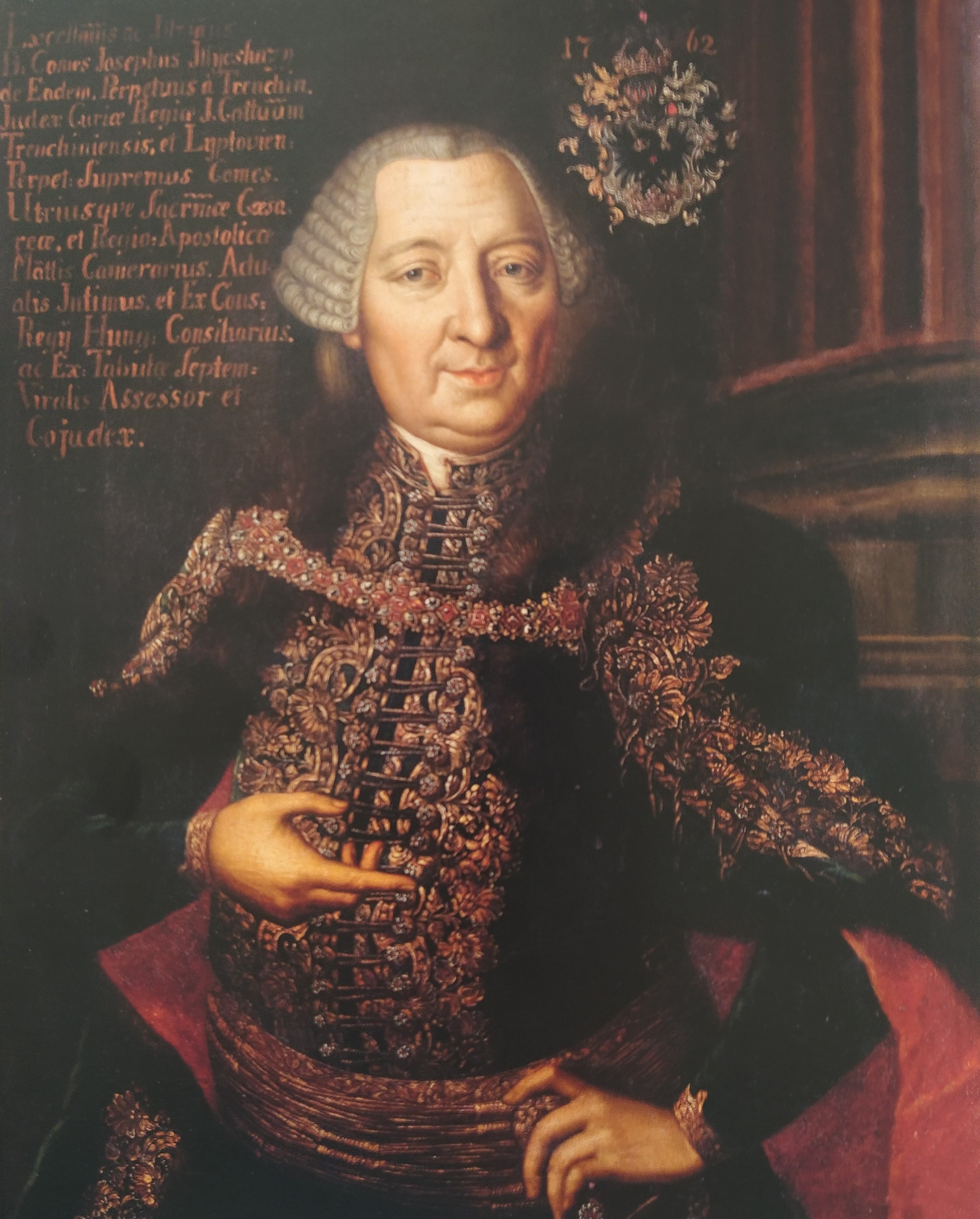

Judge Royal of the Kingdom of Hungary
- In office 21 August 1759 – 1765
- Preceded by: György Erdődy
- Succeeded by: Miklós Pálffy

Master of the Treasury of the Kingdom of Hungary
- In office 24 November 1755 – 21 August 1759
- Preceded by: Ferenc Esterházy
- Succeeded by: Ádám Batthyány

Personal details
- Born: 1700 Pressburg
- Died: 8 February 1766 (aged 65–66)
- Spouse(s): Franciska Csáky (died 1728) Petronella von Abensberg und Traun (died 1766)
- Children: 4
- Parent(s): Miklós Illésházy; Erzsébet Balassa

Count József Illésházy de Illésháza (1700 – 8 February 1766) was a Hungarian nobleman, from 1755 to 1759 he was Master of the Treasury and from 1759 until 1765, he was Judge Royal of the Kingdom of Hungary.

== Early life ==
Illésházy was born in c. 1700 in Pressburg. He was the son of Court Chancellor Count Miklós Illésházy (1653–1723) and Countess Erzsébet Balassa de Kékkő et Gyarmat (1656–1707). His sister, Countess Anna Mária Illésházy de Illésháza, was the wife of Count György Lipót László Erdődy de Monyorókerék et Monoszló.

His paternal grandparents were Baron Ferenc IV Illésházy de Illésháza and Erzsébet Sárkány de Ákosháza (a daughter of Baron Miklós III Sárkány de Ákosháza). His maternal grandparents were Baron Imre Balassa de Kékkő et Gyarmat and Borbála Lippay de Zombor (a daughter of Gáspár Lippay de Zombor).

== Career ==
In 1724 he became the Hereditary Count of Liptó (today in northern Slovakia) and Trencsén County (today in western Slovakia). He served as a steward between 1730 and 1755, and then became Master of the Treasury on 24 November 1755. Queen Maria Theresa of Hungary appointed him Judge Royal of Hungary on 21 August 1759. He held this position until 1765, when he resigned, shortly before his death at the beginning of the following year.

He was made a Knight Grand Cross of the Order of Saint Stephen.

From his father, he inherited Érd in Pest County. He only had possession briefly, however, as between 1735 and 1752 he pledged it to Baron András Pongrácz, and then to Baron János Péterffy. His son, Count János, added a tower to the church of St. Michael in 1774. After Count János's son, Count István, died in 1838, Érd was acquired by his cousin, Fülöp, 4th Prince Batthyány-Strattmann (the grandson of Countess Mária Terézia Illésházy).

== Personal life ==
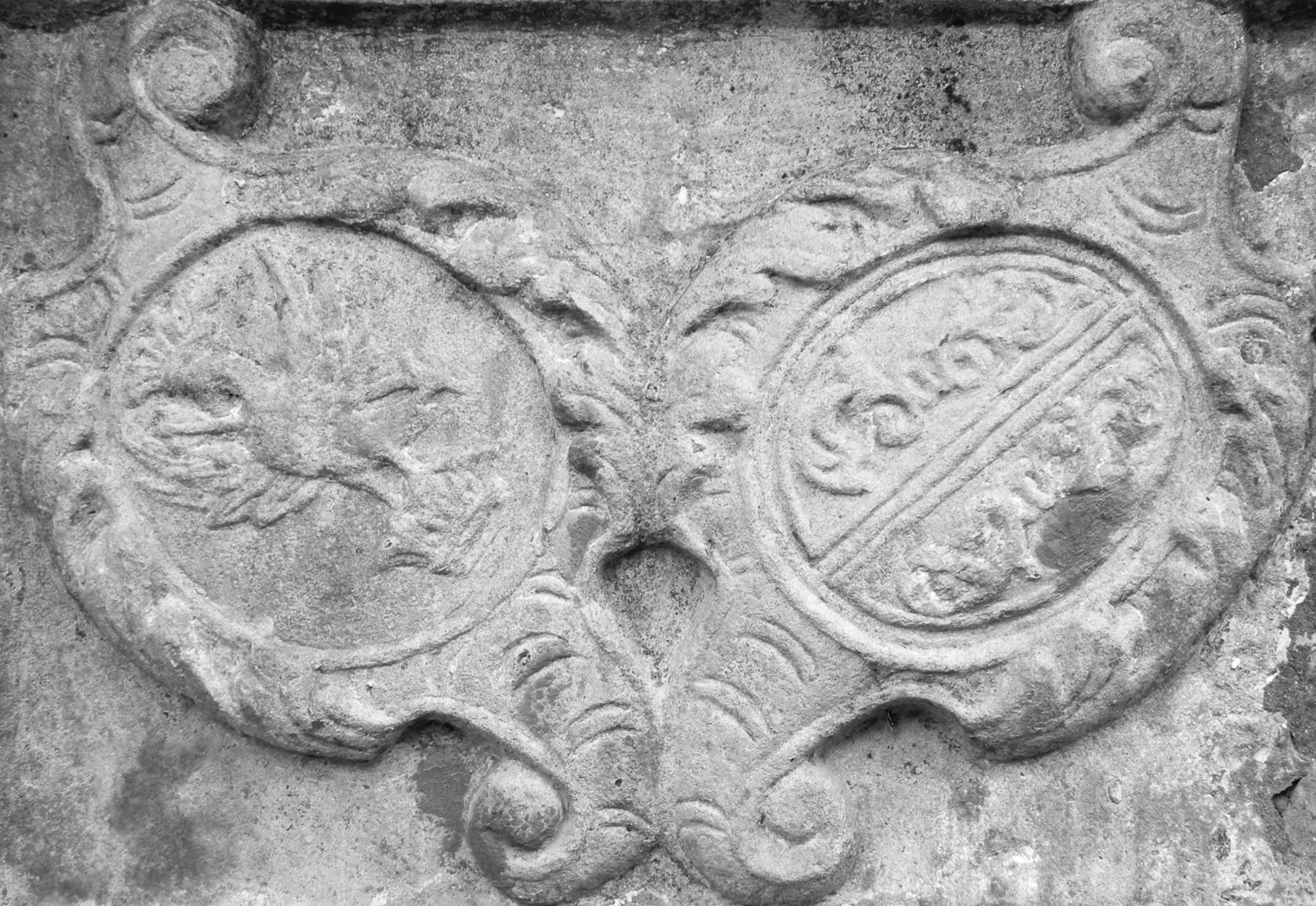
Coats of arms of Illésházy and his second wife; Statue of St. John of Nepomuk, Trenčianske Teplice, Slovakia.

Illésházy was twice married and had four children, one son and three daughters. His first wife was Countess Franciska Csáky de Körösszegh et Adorján, a daughter of Count Zsigmond Csáky, who also served as Master of the Treasury, and Countess Mária Anna Serényi. Before her death in 1728, they were the parents of:

- Countess Júlia Illésházy de Illésháza, who married Count János Balassa de Kékkő et Gyarmat.

After the death of his first wife in 1728, he married Countess Theresia Petronella von Abensberg und Traun (1710–1790), a daughter of Count Franz Anton von Abensberg und Traun and Countess Eleonóra Pálffy ab Erdöd (a daughter of Count Miklós Pálffy). Together, they were the parents of:

- Countess Mária Terézia Illésházy de Illésháza (1734–1807), who married Ádám Wenzel, 2nd Prince Batthyány-Strattmann, nephew and heir of Károly József, 1st Prince Batthyány-Strattmann.
- Count János Illéshazy de Illéshaza (1736–1799), who married Countess Szidonia Regina Batthyány, a daughter of Ádám III Batthyány and Terezia Esterházy de Galántha.
- Countess Mária Franciska Illésházy de Illésháza (1740–1817), who married Count József György Batthyány, elder brother of Bishop Ignác Batthyány.

Illésházy died on 8 February 1766.
