= Pinkafeld =

- Municipality
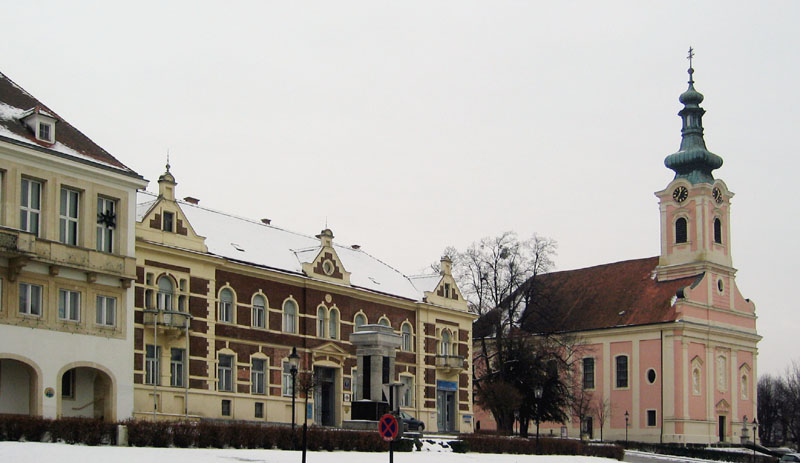
- Town centre

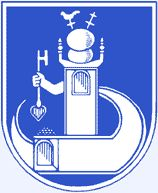
- Coat of arms

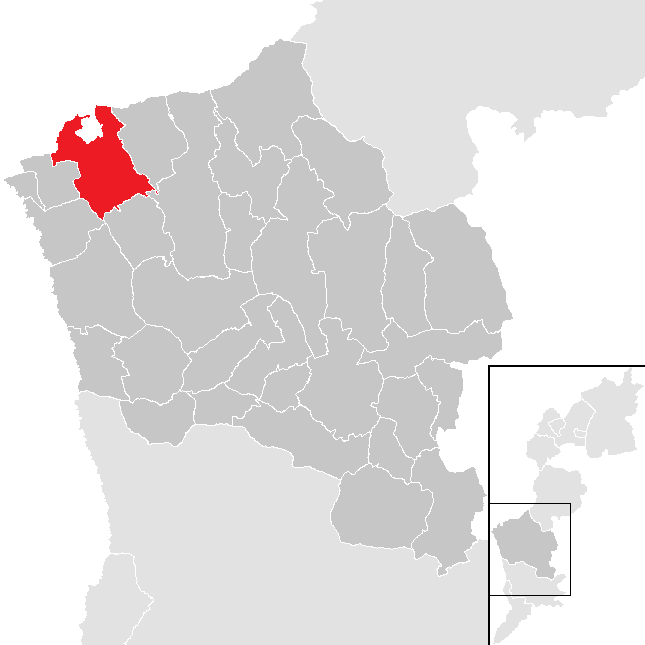
- Location within Oberwart district

- Location within Austria
- Coordinates: 47°22′N 16°7′E
- Country: Austria
- State: Burgenland
- District: Oberwart

Government
  - Mayor: Kurt Maczek (SPÖ)

Area
  - Total: 27.43 km^{2} (10.59 sq mi)
- Elevation: 399 m (1,309 ft)

Population (2018-01-01)
  - Total: 5,779
  - Density: 210.7/km^{2} (545.7/sq mi)
- Time zone: UTC+1 (CET)
  - Summer (DST): UTC+2 (CEST)
- Postal code: 7423
- Website: www.pinkafeld-online.at

Pinkafeld (Hungarian: Pinkafő, Croatian: Pinkafelj, Slovene: Pinkafel, Romani: Pinkafa) is a city in Burgenland in Austria and the second largest settlement (after Oberwart) in the district Oberwart.

== Geography ==
Parts of the commune are Hochart, Gfangen, Alt-Pinkafeld, Nord-Pinkafeld and Pinkafeld Stadt. Pinkafeld lies on the course of the river Pinka, which gives the town its name.

== History ==
- 860 - The first mention of Pinkafeld ("Peincahu")
- 1289 - The destruction of Pinkafeld ("Pinkafelde")
- 1397 - Pinkafeld is no longer part of Bernstein
- 1532 - The Ottomans destroy Pinkafeld
- 1658 - Ádám Batthyány constructs a castle in Pinkafeld
- 1921 - Pinkafeld becomes part of Austria, no longer under control by Hungary

== Population ==
Historical population
Year	Pop.	±%
1697	1,500	—
1804	1,821	+21.4%
1844	2,351	+29.1%
1869	2,683	+14.1%
1880	3,080	+14.8%
1890	3,078	−0.1%
1900	3,156	+2.5%
1910	3,089	−2.1%
1923	2,776	−10.1%
1934	3,788	+36.5%
1939	3,695	−2.5%
1951	3,753	+1.6%
1961	4,081	+8.7%
1971	4,620	+13.2%
1981	4,792	+3.7%
1991	5,010	+4.5%
2001	5,181	+3.4%
2011	5,328	+2.8%

== Politics ==
The mayor is Kurt Maczek of the SPÖ (Social Democratic Party of Austria). The vice-Mayor is Thomas Pickl of the ÖVP (Austrian People's Party). In the representation, which has 25 mandates, the SPÖ has 16 mandates and the ÖVP has 9.

== Events ==
In 2012, the FCI European Open Junior Agility competition was hosted in Pinkafeld.

== Notable people from Pinkafeld ==
- Ádám Batthyány (1610–1659), a Hungarian count of the Batthyány family; built a castle locally
- Carl Vaugoin (1873–1949), politician; eleventh Chancellor of Austria in 1930.
- Norbert Hofer (born 1971), an Austrian politician; raised in Pinkafeld
