= Ervin Batthyány =

Hungarian political activist & journalist (1877–1945)

Count Ervin Batthyány de Németújvár
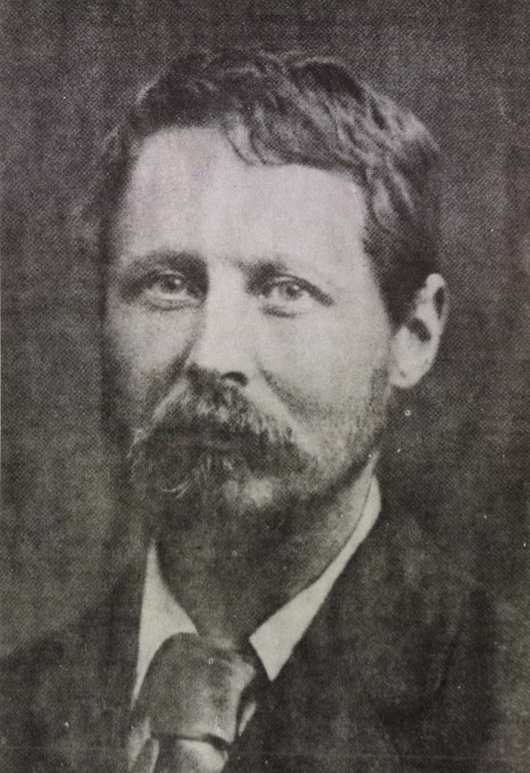
- Born: 17 October 1877; Bögöte, Austria-Hungary
- Died: 9 June 1945 (aged 67); United Kingdom
- Known for: Early Hungarian anarchist, set up a libertarian school in his village of Bögöte
- Movement: Anarchism; Anarcho-syndicalism

Count Ervin Batthyány (17 October 1877 – 9 June 1945) was a Hungarian political activist, school founder and journalist. He promoted anarchist principles in early 20th century Hungary.

== Early life ==
Ervin Batthyány was born on 17 October 1877 in Bögöte to Ferenc Batthyány and Edit Trefort. Ervin's father was a wealthy landowner from the Batthyány family, and his mother was the daughter of Education Minister Ágoston Trefort. Both belonged to a circle of intellectuals receptive to reform.

Ervin graduated from high school in Budapest, and studied in Cambridge and London. There, he became influenced by the ideas of Edward Carpenter, William Morris, Leo Tolstoy and Peter Kropotkin. In London, he met with Kropotkin on one occasion.

Afraid of his political leanings, and fearing that he would divide his inherited land among wage earners, Batthyány's family had him placed in a mental sanatorium in Vienna in 1901. He stayed there for two years, leaving in 1903 with the help of Ervin Szabó, the prerequisite for which was to write a scientific paper. He wrote on Carpenter's ideas for transforming society.

== Anarchist activism ==
Batthyány first espoused his anarchist views at one of the debates of the Társadalomtudományi Társaság (Social Science Society) titled "The Direction of Social Development". The debates were held from February to May 1904 in the Chamber of Commerce and Industry building in Budapest. At the time, his idea of anarchism was most strongly influenced by Morris and Kropotkin, though he would later advocate for not only tactical, but strategic unity between socialists and anarchists in his 1906 publication Socialism and Anarchism. The panel also hosted socialists represented by Ervin Szabó, liberals represented by Gusztáv Gratz and Christian socialists represented by Sarolta Geőcze. During this time, Batthyány considered conservatism, liberalism and Christian socialism parts of a common strand of social theory that wished to preserve the social order limited by "theocratic prejudices", opposed by socialism and anarchism.

On 29 October 1905, Batthyány set up a libertarian school or "reform school" for peasant children on his estate in Bögöte. The estate was managed by his personal friend Herbert Nadler. Ervin Szabó attended the opening ceremony, and the socialist agitator Lajos Tarczai was made head teacher. Around 60 children attended Batthyány's school, and it enjoyed the support of several of the villagers such as the doctor. Eventually, the teacher from the local Catholic school transferred to his school as well. The school was opposed by the local Catholic chaplain and other conservative landowners from the area.

In Bögöte, Batthyány set up a printing press and started the journal Testvériség (Brotherhood), associated with the Szombathely social democrats. He published several studies on Kropotkin and Tolstoy, also focusing on printing brochures. He would soon break with the social democrats due to ideological differences.

In Budapest, Batthyány wrote for the journals Világszabadság (World Freedom) and A Jövő (The Future). In 1907, he started an anarchist paper titled Társadalmi forradalom (Social Revolution), during which his views evolved from an anarchism in the vein of Kropotkin, in the direction of anarcho-syndicalism. At the anarchist conference in Amsterdam in 1907, he presented a written presentation on the situation of anarchism in Hungary. He quickly handed over the position of editor of his new journal to the Budapest Anarchist Group that formed around him, and from then on he gradually withdrew from the movement.

== Final years and death ==
In 1910 he returned to England, and in 1913 he requested the termination of his Hungarian citizenship. The school in Bögöte was taken over by the state in 1921.

In England, Batthyány married Alice Nuellens (1857–1933). He died in England in 1945.

== Legacy ==
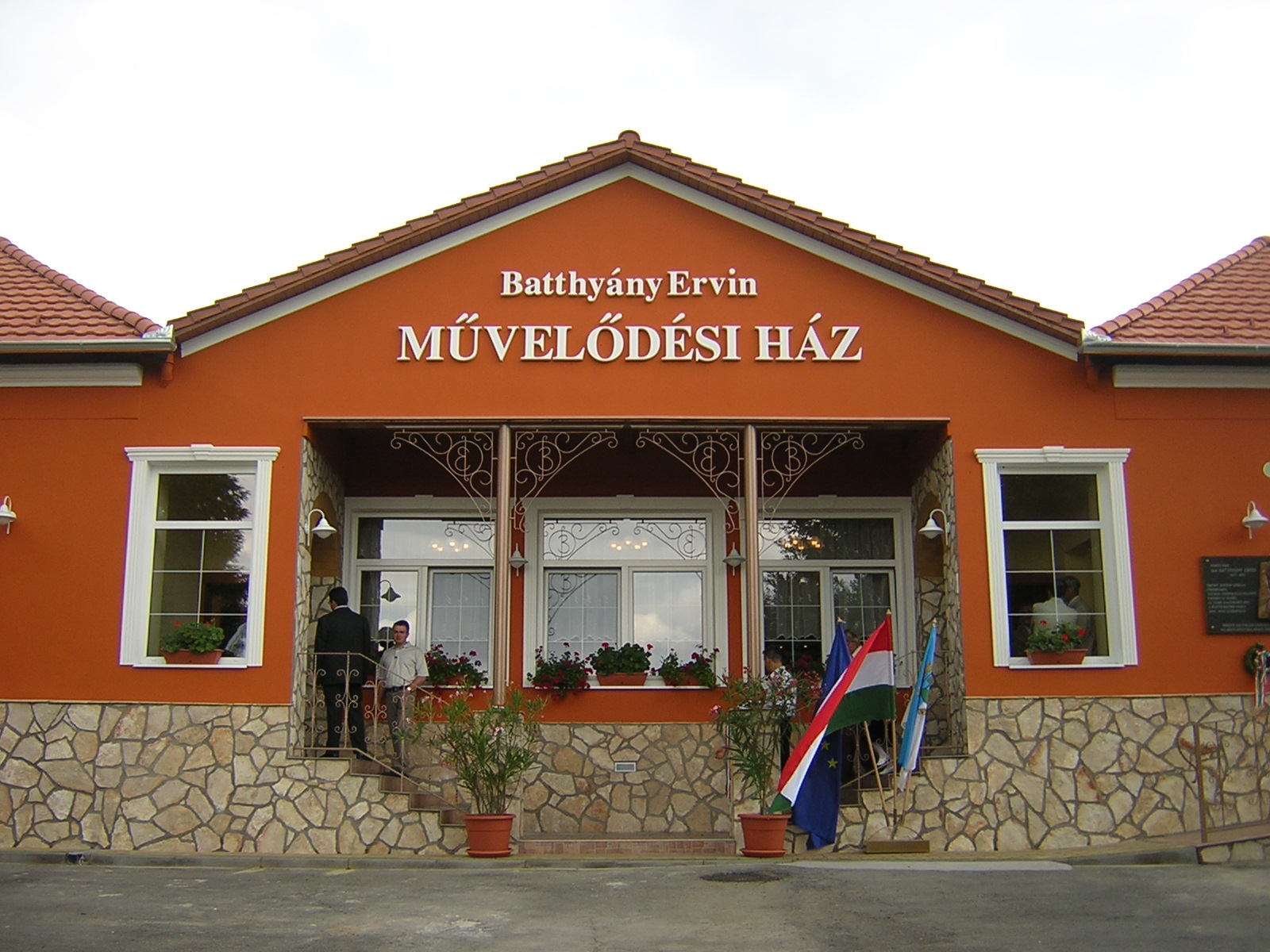
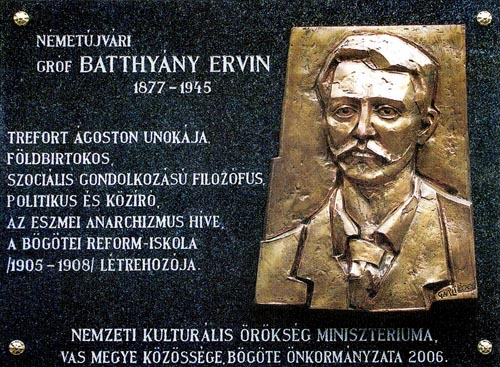
The Ervin Batthyány Cultural Center and memorial plaque in Bögöte

In his village of Bögöte, the cultural center bears the name of Ervin Batthyány. A plaque was unveiled in his honor in 2006.

== See also ==
- Anarchism in Hungary
- Anarchism and education
