= Anarchism in Romania =

Anarchism in Romania developed in the 1880s within the larger Romanian socialist movement and it had a small following throughout all the existence of the Kingdom of Romania. Social anarchism was initially propagated by the Revista Ideei during the time of the Old Kingdom, but following the rise of Bolshevism, socialist tendencies were sidelined in favor of individualism and vegetarianism, which were the predominant anarchist tendencies in Romania during the 1920s and 1930s.

After the Romanian Communist Party takeover in 1947, no other alternative political movement was allowed, so the anarchist movement faded away. Since the Romanian Revolution, a number of small anarchist organizations were created, but anarchism is still less visible than in Western Europe.

== Forerunners ==
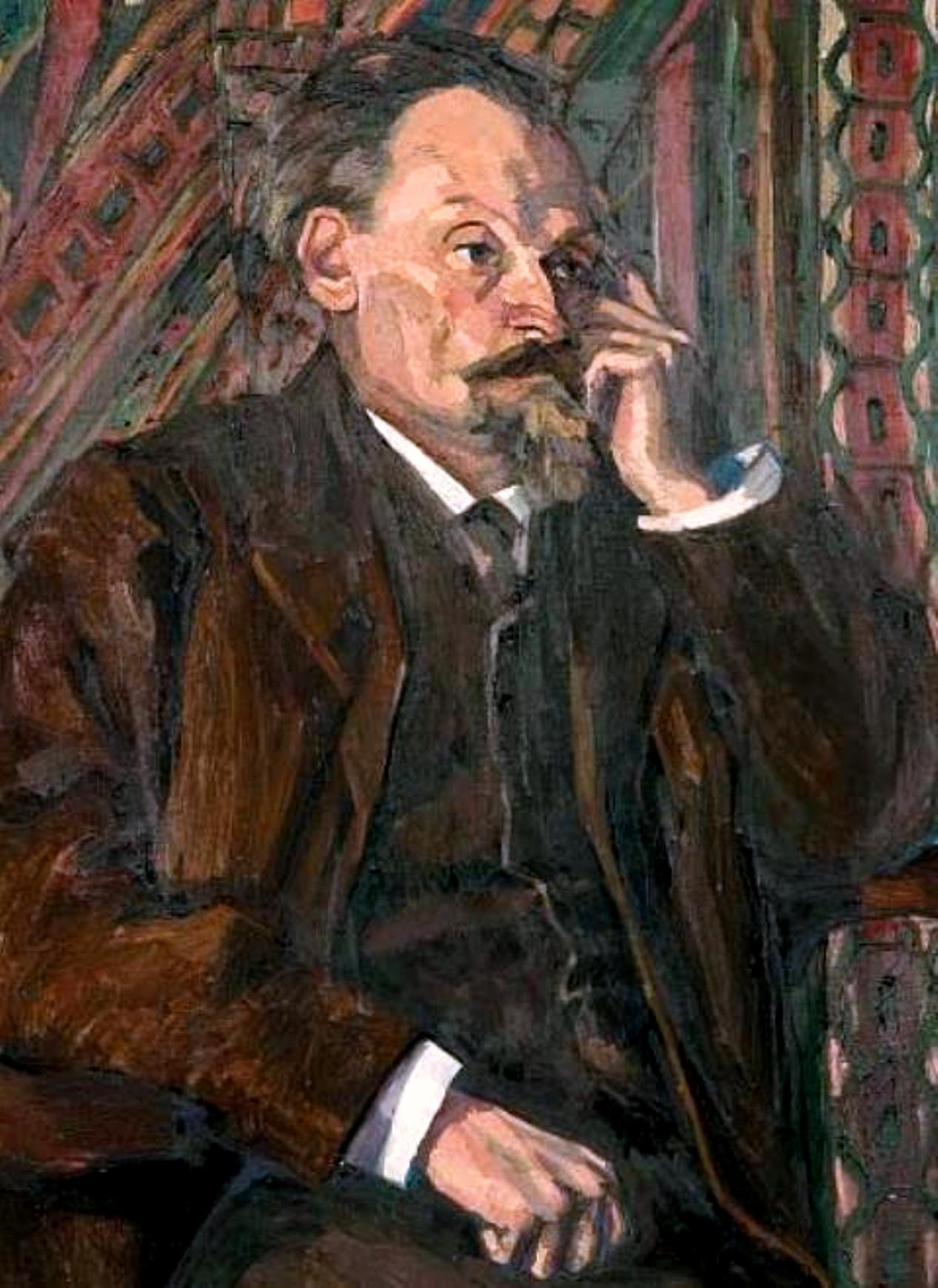
Romanian anarchist Zamfir Arbore, 1914 portrait by his daughter

After being released from prison for his participation in the activities of the narodniks in the Russian Empire during the 1860s, the Bucovinian socialist Zamfir Arbore fled into exile in Switzerland, where he met Mikhail Bakunin, the leader of the anarchist faction in the International Workingmen's Association (IWA). Arbore sided with Bakunin during the split of the IWA and rejected Marxism, declaring himself in favor of "Bakuninism" and federalism. In 1871, he moved to Romania to continue his narodnik activities, later collaborating with Peter Kropotkin and Élisée Reclus. Arbore was the only isolated case of anarchism in the country until the establishment of the Romanian Old Kingdom, when a broader movement first started to emerge. Another Romanian Narodnik that came to sympathize with anarchism was Constantin Dobrogeanu-Gherea, although he later abandoned his libertarian convictions and became a critic of anarchist theory. During this period, the Bulgarian revolutionary Hristo Botev established an anarchist group in the Moldavian city of Galați and the country was briefly visited by the Italian anarchist Errico Malatesta, following which translations of anarchist works into the Romanian language began.

Another forerunner of Romanian anarchism was Paraskev Stoyanov, of Bulgarian origin, born in 1871 (or 1874) in Giurgiu, where his father, an active campaigner for national liberation, had fled Turkish persecution. Stoyanov had a solid education and became a surgeon. After primary school in Bucharest, he adhered to socialist ideas through high school, then to anarchism after reading Peter Kropotkin's pamphlet "An Appeal To The Young". Thus, in high school, he founded book clubs for students studying socialism and anarchism and began to spread anarchism among the workers in Romania, coming to be considered the "father" of anarchism in the country. He translated Errico Malatesta's numerous pamphlets into Romanian, including "For The Voters", "Between Peasants" and "Anarchy".

== Social anarchism in the Old Kingdom ==
According to the German historian Max Nettlau, the Romanian socialist movement, which emerged following the establishment of the Romanian Old Kingdom in 1881, itself had anarchist origins. Anarchism developed as a specific tendency in the Wallachian capital of Bucharest, where the socialist movement was more radical than its counterpart in the Moldavian capital of Iași. By 1884, most of the books in the Bucharest socialist library were anarchist works, from the likes of Mikhail Bakunin, Ferdinand Domela Nieuwenhuis, Jean Grave, Peter Kropotkin, Élisée Reclus. Between 1884 and 1890, the Human Rights Social Studies Circle organized reading groups in Bucharest, influenced by the ideas of Bakunin, Reclus and Kropotkin, which had been brought to Romania by people who studied in Western Europe. But by the 1890s, the reformist tendency led by Ioan Nădejde had reorganized the Circle into the Social Democratic Workers' Party of Romania (PSDMR), defeating the anarchist tendencies within the organization and eventually distancing itself entirely from the anarchist movement due to the rise of "propaganda of the deed". This move towards social democracy was decisively influenced by Constantin Dobrogeanu-Gherea, who published a series of articles critiquing the libertarian and revolutionary tendencies within socialism. Dobrogeanu-Gherea's works directly contributed to the association of anarchism with violence and chaos, which became popularized in many sections of Romanian society. He considered anarchism to be a "social disease" which would inevitably attracted criminal elements of society, concurring with the work of his contemporary, the Italian criminologist Cesare Lombroso.

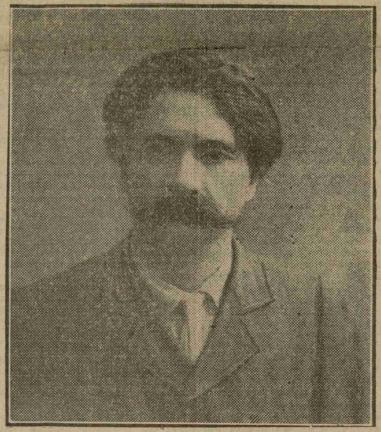
Panait Muşoiu, leader of the Romanian anarchist movement from 1890 to 1912.

Among the anarchists that Nădejde purged from the organization was Panait Muşoiu, who subsequently left Bucharest for Galați, but he would be expelled from the local socialist club in that city as well. Upon his return to Bucharest, Muşoiu became the leading figure in the Romanian anarchist movement, overseeing it until the outbreak of the Balkan Wars. After a split in the PSDMR in 1899, the now-scattered social-democratic tendencies gave way for anarchism to return to prominence. The following year, Panait Muşoiu and Panait Zosin founded the Revista Ideei (Idea's Magazine), which published Romanian language translations of works by social anarchists such as Mikhail Bakunin and Peter Kropotkin, as well as individualist anarchists such as Max Stirner, Han Ryner and Henry David Thoreau. The Romanian authorities reported a particular rise in anarchist activity in the wake of the 1905 Russian Revolution. Apart from the circle which met at Mușoiu's house in the capital, anarchists circles were also established in Piața Amzei and Ploiești. Preeminent figures of Romanian literature, such as Alexandru Bogdan-Pitești and Panait Istrati, were also attracted towards anarchism during this period.

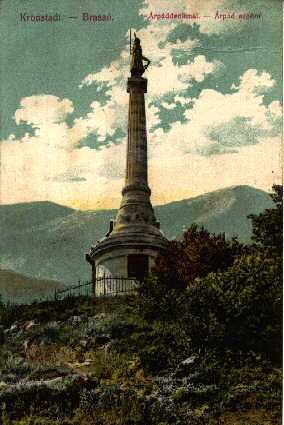
Árpád's statue in Brașov, (then in Austria-Hungary) symbolizing the Hungarian rule of the Pannonian Basin, was destroyed in 1913 by a bomb set up by Romanian anarchist Ilie Cătărău

While in the middle of a sustained wave of immigration by Italian anarchists to Romania, rumors began to circulate about an alleged anarchist plot to carry out a terrorist attack in Romania. Anarchism began to concern the Siguranța, the country's secret police, which began monitoring the anarchist movement. The Romanian government itself was signatory to an anti-anarchist treaty, which set up a system for sharing information on the anarchist movement with other European states. By 1907, the Securitatea had compiled two lists of anarchists: first was a list of 20 anarchist activists and second, a list of 50 public servants who were subscribed to Revista Ideei. A report of the secret police argued that anarchist propaganda contributed to the 1907 Romanian Peasants' Revolt. As example is given a certain village teacher, Nicolăescu-Cranta, a friend of Mușoiu, who contributed to the start of the revolts through the speeches he gave to the peasants. As antisemitism and political repression began to spread throughout Romania, a number of Romanian Jewish anarchists fled into exile, with Joseph Ishill and Marcus Graham both becoming prominent figures in the American anarchist movement.

Even after an anarchist railroad worker attempted to assassinate Prime Minister Ion I. C. Brătianu in 1909, the anarchist movement continued to grow rapidly, with numerous libertarian circles being established in cities throughout Romania. But the outbreak of World War I had the effect of demobilizing the socialist movement, including the anarchists. Within years, anarchism was supplanted as the dominant socialist tendency by Bolshevism, following the success of the Russian Revolution. By the early 1920s, the national liberal politician Nicolae Petrescu declared that a "proper movement of militant anarchism or anarchist theorists" no longer existed in Romania.

== Individualist anarchism in Interbellum Romania ==
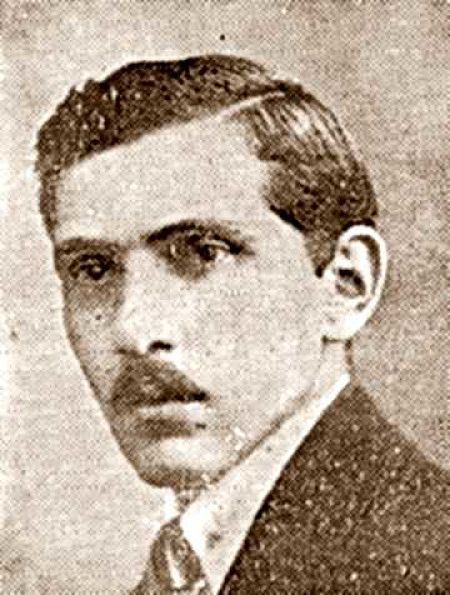
Eugen Relgis, the anarcho-pacifist founder of the Humanitarian Movement and a leading figure of Romanian anarchism during the interbellum era.

In 1923, the Romanian pacifist Eugen Relgis founded the Mișcarea Umanitaristă (English: Humanitarian Movement), a non-doctrinal anti-militarist organization which brought together several anarchists, including Panait Muşoiu. In 1928, the movement established a newspaper Umanitaristul (English: Humanitarianism), which had obvious libertarian influences, publishing the works of Han Ryner and Ferdinand Domela Nieuwenhuis. It received a donation from the French individualist Émile Armand, and Relgis translated one of Armand's works. During the late 1920s, the movement established 24 branches throughout Romania. In 1932, Relgis shelved Umanitaristul and began contributing to Ion Ionescu-Căpățână's magazine Vegetarismul (English: Vegetarianism), which advocated for vegetarianism, citing social, economic, medical and even religious motivations. Over time, it began to draw heavily from individualist anarchism, inspired by the works of Max Stirner and Émile Armand.

Throughout the 1930s, numerous individualist tendencies began to develop in Romania, including primitivism, naturism and nomadism, which developed critiques of industrialization, civilization and urbanization. During this period, Romanian individualist anarchists abandoned their goal of a social revolution and began to neglect socialism, in favor of living a lifestyle characterized by the liberty and autonomy of the individual. In one article, Ionescu-Căpățână claimed that social reform often begins with individual lifestyle changes, through the practice of prefigurative politics, and that individual freedom was "the most precious thing in the world." The individualism espoused by the Romanian anarchists even extended to their fashion, which enabled self-expression, sometimes in the form of nudism.

While the Romanian individualists idealized the state of nature, they did not nostalgize the past, instead conceiving the rejection of contemporary mores as an affirmation of freedom. They considered the greatest barrier to freedom to be the work day and wage labor, which interfered with their desired individualist lifestyles. It was their critique of work that particularly developed their political orientation towards social anarchism, drawing from the works of Peter Kropotkin, Élisée Reclus and Henry David Thoreau. One Valeriu Buja, who was particularly inspired by Thoreau, wrote a passionate defense of anti-statism from an individualist perspective:

“By what right am I bound between borders, between laws, when I want to be a brother to all men? [...] In itself, state organization is selfish and immoral. By what right does someone declare me to be a Romanian citizen, when I do not want to be a Romanian citizen, nor a French citizen, nor of any other nationality, but a man, a brother of everyone?”

The development of individualist anarchism in Romania culminated in proposals to establish an intentional community, which was to be organized according to Kropotkin's model of anarcho-communism and theory of mutual aid, but this project was stillborn due to a lack of volunteers. Vegetarismul also found itself unable to meet the at least 500 subscribers necessary to continue publication, leading to the newspaper ceasing publication in 1934. The following year, Ion Ionescu-Căpățână emigrated to France, where he organized support for the Republicans during the Spanish Civil War. In his French exile, Ionescu-Căpățână collaborated with Gérard de Lacaze-Duthiers on the magazine Aristocratie and announced that he was working on a history of the Romanian anarchist movement, although this would never be published, as Ionescu-Căpățână died in 1942. By this time, anarchism had ceased to be a major force in Romania, instead existing mostly in the upper classes' fears of terrorism. While visiting Max Nettlau in Vienna, Eugen Relgis commented that:

"In our country, the anarchist is a scarecrow. For bourgeois and children, he must have a fierce face, tousled hair, sometimes lavalier knotted like a noose, but always a bomb or at least a dagger in his pocket."

== Repression and exile ==
Following the rise of fascism in Romania, anarchist works were among the books that were burned by the National Legionary State. Panait Mușoiu died a few months after the overthrow of the fascist regime and, following the proclamation of the Romanian People's Republic in 1947, Eugen Relgis fled into exile in Uruguay, bringing an end to the second period of anarchism in Romania. Unlike in neighboring countries, there had been no active anarchist resistance to the rise of authoritarianism in Romania, which ultimately gave way to the institution of Marxism–Leninism. While the new socialist government undertook the suppression of the remaining anarchist movement, it also rehabilitated a number of Romanian social anarchists, including Panait Mușoiu, whose anti-authoritarian views were downplayed.

In 1952, Relgis published the first comprehensive history of the Romanian anarchist movement in the French magazine À contre-courant, in which he publicly declared his own affinity for anti-authoritarianism for the first time. Now openly identifying with anarchism, Relgis also published a work on his own philosophy of "Libertarian Humanism", which synthesized libertarian and humanitarian ideals. Relgis considered it important to develop an indigenous expression of Romanian anarchism, one that was equally capable of surviving repression by the new socialist regime, opposing the rise of reactionary elements and resisting recuperation in the case of a potential democratic restoration. During the 1970s, the Spanish anarchist Vladimiro Muñoz began collecting together texts about the Romanian anarchist movement, creating an anthology that included biographies of Panait Mușoiu, Joseph Ishill, Zamfir Arbure, as well as various other materials provided to him by Relgis.

Following the rise to power of Nicolae Ceaușescu, a number of histories about the old socialist movement were published by historians such as Zigu Ornea. During this period, a number of monographs were published about anarchists such as Panait Mușoiu and Eugen Relgis, although these downplayed their libertarian tendencies, often failing to even mention "anarchism" by name.

== Anarchism in contemporary Romania ==
In 1989, the Socialist Republic of Romania was overthrown by the Romanian Revolution, which culminated in the trial and execution of Nicolae and Elena Ceaușescu. Anarchism experienced a revival following the constitution of Romania as a democratic republic. Contemporary Romanian anarchism first grew out of the punk subculture, developing a notably prominent following in the Banatian city of Timisoara and the Wallachian city of Craiova. The extension of internet access brought with it a number of online anarchist publications, including URA: Ura și Razboiul și Anarhia (English: Hate & War & Anarchy) and Dragostea Ucide (English: Love Kills), published by the Timisoara Aactiv-ist Collective and the Craiova Anarcho-Front. Romanian anarchist groups subsequently developed links with anarchist movements in neighboring countries, such as Hungary and Serbia, while some have adopted the tactics of the American anarchist movement, including the Critical Mass and Food Not Bombs.

During the 2000s, a number of anarchists began organizing in Romania for the first time after the revolution. The anarchists occupied several squats, they organized a "Food Not Bombs" campaign (distributing free vegetarian food in poor neighbourhoods), they spread fliers against fast-food and ripped Neo-Nazi posters from public places. In a few instances (in Bucharest and Timișoara), there have been fights with the Noua Dreaptă Neo-Nazis, who had gone into their underground clubs during concerts.

In November 2006, a number of 100 anarchists participated in the first anti-fascist march in Bucharest, holding red and black banners. In June 2007, a group of 20 anarchists showed up at a march against homosexuality organized the Neo-Nazi organization Noua Dreaptă, but they were arrested by the gendarmes for holding an unauthorized protest.

Anarchists are one of the groups that are monitored by the Romanian Intelligence Service (SRI), including on online forums. One report by the SRI declared that anarchism had been imported into Romania by "foreigners involved in drug trafficking and the dissemination of hard pornography."

During the 2008 Bucharest NATO summit, the government prepared a repression of anarchists who might have protested against NATO and militarism. Six German anarchists were disallowed to enter Romania. Anti-globalization activists rented an industrial hall where they intended to spray paint banners which they wanted to use in the protests against NATO. The police arrested 56 anti-globalization activists who were later released without charges. Some of the arrested people complained that they were beaten up by the police.

While anarchist activism had been revived, academic interest in the Romanian anarchist movement was largely non-existent, in part due to the rise of anti-communism, which viewed even libertarian socialism with suspicion. It was only in the 2010s that a comprehensive historiography of the Romanian anarchist movement emerged, with the publication of Vlad Brătuleanu's Anarhismul în România, the first historical study of anarchism in Romania since the 1940s. Brătuleanu identified a number of key periods in the classical Romanian anarchist movement: the forerunners (1866–1881), the socialist period (1881–1918) and the individualist period (1918–1947), although the historiographer Adrian Tătăran considered this strict chronology to be a weakness of the study. The German historian Martin Veith also contributed to this history with biographies on Panait Muşoiu and Ștefan Gheorghiu, which took a restorative approach to highlighting their libertarian tendencies, after this had been neglected by the studies of the 1970s.

== Contemporary groups ==
Currently, in Romania there are several anarchist organizations, including:

- Ravna ("Anarcho-Syndicalist Initiative ") based in Constanța
- Biblioteca Alternativă din București ("Alternative Library of Bucharest"), a cultural centre promoting anarchist ideas
- Grupul pentru Acțiune Socială ("The Group for Social Action") based in Cluj.

== See also ==
- Category:Romanian anarchists
- List of anarchist movements by region
- Anarchism in Bulgaria
- Anarchism in Hungary
- Anarchism in Serbia
- Anarchism in Ukraine

== Bibliography ==
- Biebuyck, Erin K. (2010). "Anarchism, Romania". In Ness, Immanuel (ed.). The International Encyclopedia of Revolution and Protest. Wiley. pp. 1–3. doi:10.1002/9781405198073.wbierp1661. ISBN 9781405198073.
- Brătuleanu, Vlad (2011). "Anarhismul în România". Studia Politica. Romanian Political Science Review (in Romanian). 11 (2). Bucharest: University of Bucharest: 274–285. ISSN 1582-4551. OCLC 958611769.
- Tătăran, Adrian (2018a). "Anarhismul în România: istoriile uitate ale unei istorii uitate". Anuarul Muzeului Național al Literaturii Române Iași (in Romanian). 3. Iaşi: Iaşi Editura Muzeelor Literare: 7–24. ISSN 2066-7469. OCLC 999612901.
- Tătăran, Adrian (2018b). "Recherches, histoire, présent : quelques notes sur l'anarchisme en Roumanie". Bulletin du CIRA Lausanne (in French). Lausanne: Centre International de Recherches sur l'Anarchisme: 23–31. OCLC 173954225.
- Tătăran, Adrian (2019). "Anarhismul și vechea mișcare socialistă din România". Idea: Artă+societate (in Romanian) (54). Cluj: Idea Design & Print: 1–13. ISSN 1583-8293. OCLC 609947940.
