= Panait Mușoiu =

Romanian anarchist (1864–1944)

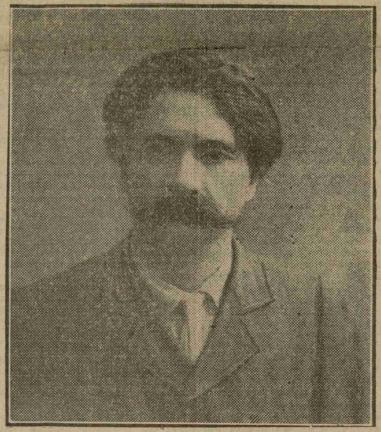
- Born: November 18, 1864; Roman, Roman County, Romanian United Principalities
- Died: November 16, 1944 (aged 79); Bucharest, Kingdom of Romania
- Known for: Translating The Communist Manifesto into Romanian
- Political party: PCdR
- Movement: Anarchism

Panait Mușoiu (18 November 1864 – 14 November 1944) was a Romanian anarchist and socialist activist, the author of the first Romanian translation of The Communist Manifesto. He was one of the main figures of anarchism in Romania and the founder of several left-wing magazines (Munca, Mișcarea socială, Revista ideei) in which he published several articles on political and social issues, with the purpose of "emancipating the people".

== Bibliography ==
- Propaganda în mişcarea socială (1891)
- Determinismul social (1892)
- Despre mişcarea socialistă (1893)
- Metoda experimentală în politică (1893)
- Scrieri (posthumously, 1976)
