= Anarchism in Hungary =

Anarchism in Hungary emerged from the social democratic movement in the late 19th century, coming to play a prominent role in the anti-militarist movement during World War I and in the subsequent revolution that culminated in the Hungarian Soviet Republic. The anarchist movement was then repressed by the Horthy regime, before re-emerging as part of the anti-fascist resistance movement during World War II. This second wave of anarchism was also repressed, this time by the newly established communist regime. Anarchist ideas were briefly expressed during the Hungarian Revolution of 1956 but remained largely suppressed until the fall of socialism, which gave way to a third wave of anarchism in Hungary.

== History ==
Following the suppression of the Hungarian Revolution of 1848, the Kingdom of Hungary was placed under martial law by the Austrian Empire. This period of political repression remained in place until the Austro-Hungarian Compromise of 1867, which established a dual monarchy with Hungarian sovereignty over the "Lands of the Crown of Saint Stephen". This brought with it an acceleration of industrialization and urbanization, which led to the gradual adoption of socialist ideas among the country's lower classes.

=== Socialism and anarchism in the Kingdom of Hungary ===
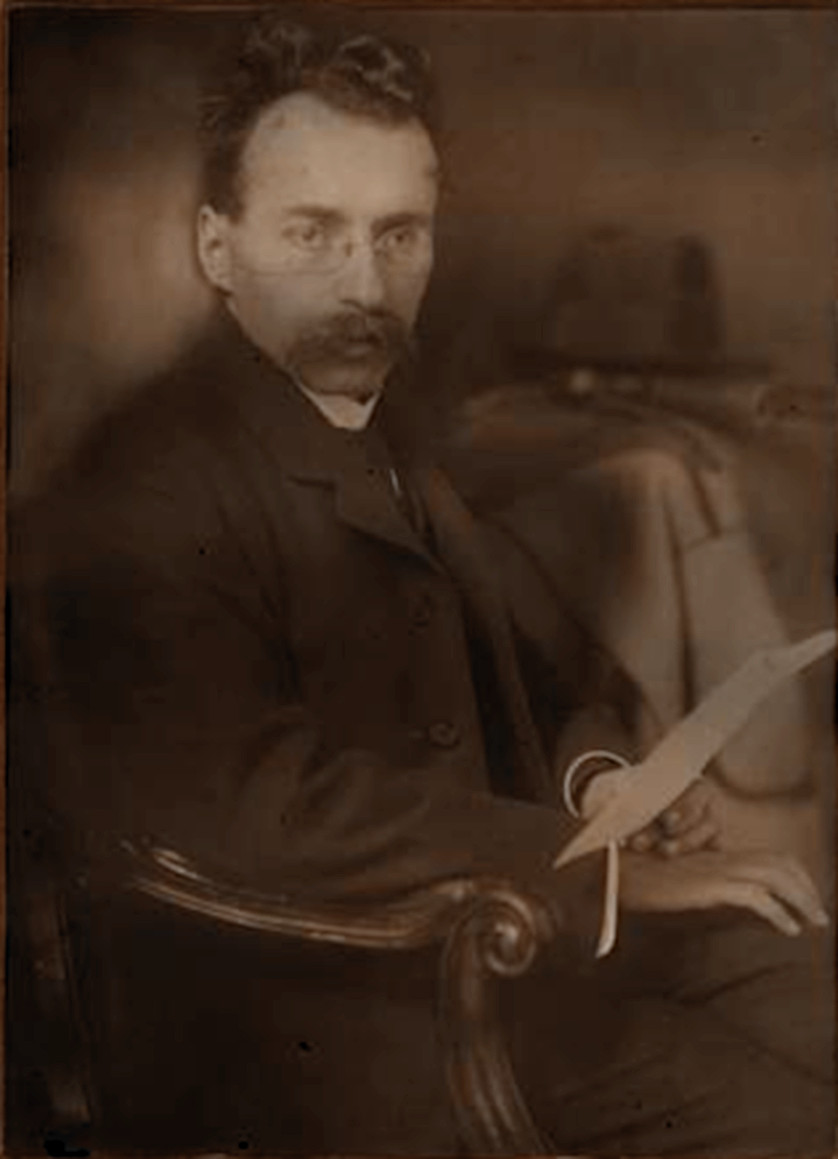
Ervin Szabó, one of the early leaders of the anarcho-syndicalist and anti-militarist movements in Hungary.

In 1881, a left-wing opposition emerged from the Social Democratic Party of Hungary, establishing a distinct social anarchist organization which advocate for the overthrow of capitalism in a popular revolution. Despite suffering censorship by the Austro-Hungarian Empire, the group published both the Hungarian language newspaper Népakarat and the German language newspaper Radikal. In 1884, the Ministry of Interior ordered the imprisonment of Hungarian anarchists and expelled foreign radicals from the country, resulting in the suppression of the group.

In the 1890s, another faction broke off from the Social Democrats and joined with a group of Christian anarchists to agitate among the Hungarian peasantry, developing a strand of agrarian socialism that was influenced by the ideas of Mutualism and Narodism. This led to the establishment of the Independent Socialist Party in 1897, which pursued an anti-statist platform based around broad policies of land reform. After the movement organized a strike among farmworkers, the Hungarian government undertook a campaign of repression against the peasants' movement, dispersing their meetings, banning their publications and forcing their leading members into exile. One of the activists that emerged from this peasant movement was the anarchist Sándor Csizmadia, who went on to form a rural workers' union in 1905. The group quickly grew to include over 75,000 members and organized peasant strikes, but was repressed by the state, which imposed fines on farmworkers that abstained from work. Ervin Szabó had also attempted to organise an internal opposition within the Social Democratic Party, in an effort to reform its platform towards a more radical agrarian politics. But he eventually broke from the party entirely and joined the Revolutionary Socialist Group, an organization of anarchists and socialists that had been disillusioned by party politics. The group published anti-parliamentary and anti-militarist propaganda throughout Budapest and Szabó himself brought revolutionary syndicalist organization to the table.

At the turn of the 20th century, Ervin Batthyany began to establish clubs, reading rooms and schools to educate people through anarchist means. At the time the Catholic Church held a monopoly on the education system, as such Batthyany's establishments were described by the clergy as "ungodly" and one of his schools was attacked by a clericalist mob. Nevertheless, Batthyany continued to provide free education, while he also funded several anarchist publications and gave lectures on the subject of anarchism. His schools were eventually requisitioned by the state and Batthyany went into exile in England.

=== World War I and the anti-militarist movement ===
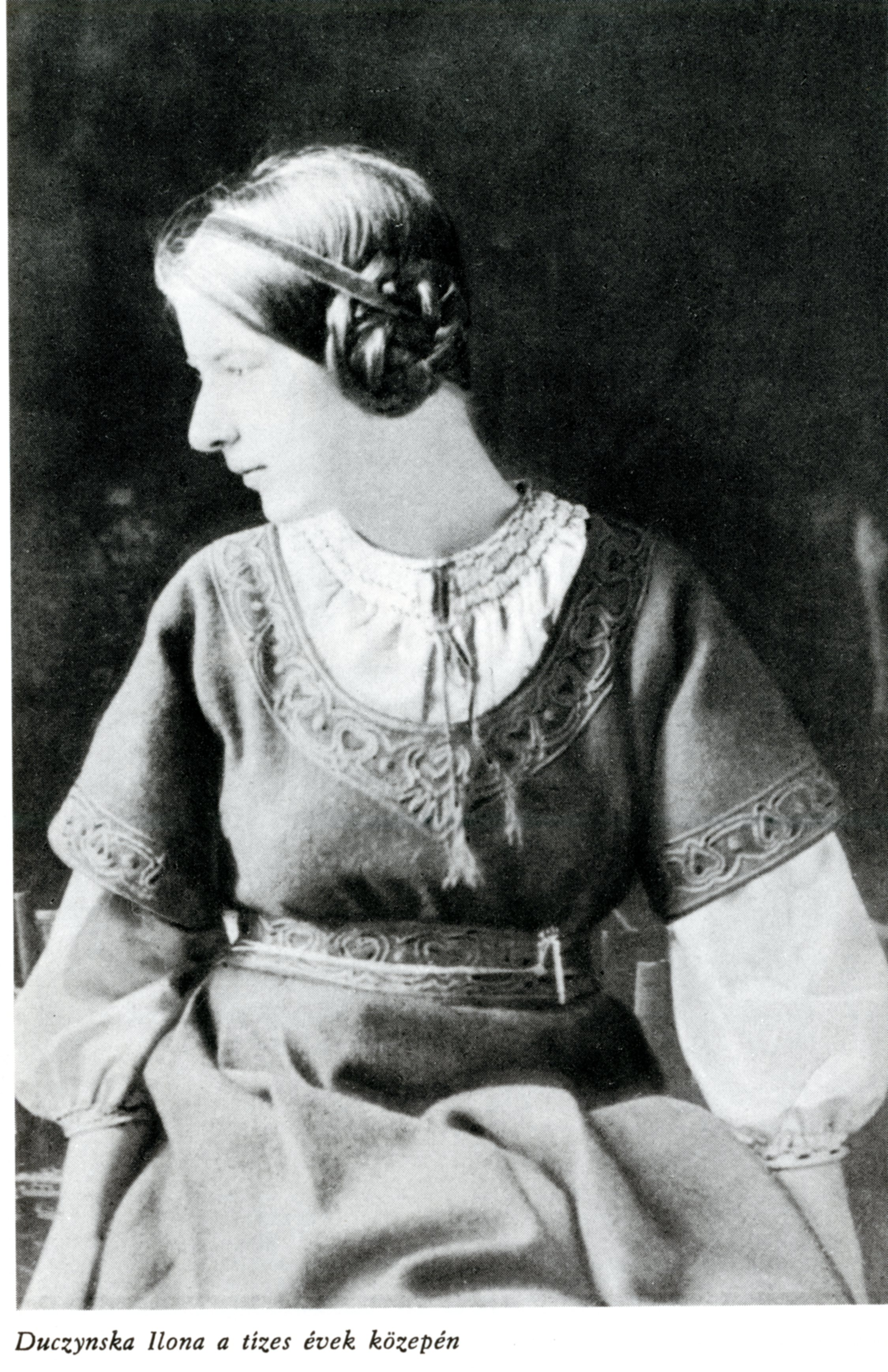
Ilona Duczyńska, an activist in the Hungarian anti-militarist movement.

Ervin Szabó was one of the early organizers in the movement against Hungarian participation in World War I, agitating alongside György Lukács, Mihály Babits and Béla Balázs. Szabó maintained regular contact with many other European anti-war activists, enough so that the Metropolitan Library acted as a centre for the distribution of anti-war propaganda in Hungary. Propaganda work was spearheaded by the anarchist writer Lajos Kassák, who published the anti-war paper A Tett, fusing his avant-garde style with a principled opposition to the militarism of the Central Powers, but was censored by the Hungarian authorities.

A core part of the anti-war movement was formed by the Galileo Circle. From September 1917, Szabó arranged regular meetings with members of the Galileo Circle and Ilona Duczyńska, during which they decided on the publication of a manifesto based on the line of the Zimmerwald movement and organized a street demonstration against the war, which led many more activists to join the group. On November 17, the group led the country's first anti-war demonstration, calling for "Peace or Revolution" before eventually being broken up by police. But despite the attempts at repression, this action ignited many more demonstrations throughout the country, organized independently by a variety of different groups. On December 26, syndicalists in Budapest even established the country's first workers' council to coordinate a general strike against the war.

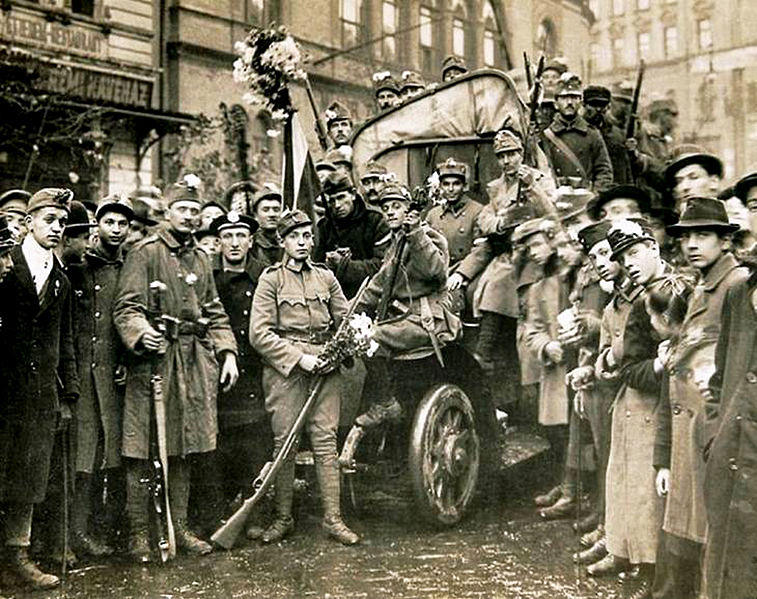
Participants of the Aster Revolution in 1918.

In January 1918, members of the Revolutionary Socialist Group were arrested after distributing anti-war leaflets within an army barracks. The Galileo Circle was subsequently suppressed and almost all the prominent members of the anti-war movement were arrested for sedition. The Budapest Workers' Council responded by calling a general strike, during which 150,000 workers demonstrated in the streets of the capital. Despite the unions that led the strike being outside the control of the Social Democratic Party, the party claimed it as their victory and quickly called off the strike, which the unions agreed to in order to avoid splitting the movement. Despite the new recruits brought into the movement by the propaganda efforts of Ottó Korvin, who distributed leaflets calling for workers' councils, featuring references to An Appeal to the Young by Peter Kropotkin, the anti-war movement was largely broken in May 1918, when over 50 leading revolutionary socialists and syndicalists were arrested by the police, including Ilona Duczyńska. In June 1918, a new wave of strikes spread throughout Hungary, protesting against the shooting of workers by the Hungarian authorities, but these strikes too were called off by the Social Democratic Party.

A sustained series of workers' strikes, peasants' rebellions and mutinies within the armed forces eventually led to the collapse of the Hungarian War Cabinet. In October 1918, the Kingdom of Hungary was finally overthrown in the Aster Revolution, which established the First Hungarian Republic. The new independentist government of Mihály Károlyi formally ended Hungary's involvement in the war and ordered the disarmament of the Hungarian Army. This action was followed by a mass workers' demonstration, during which the people of Budapest occupied police stations and disarmed the police, opened the prisons and released all political prisoners, and eventually demanded the establishment of a socialist republic.

=== The Hungarian Soviet Republic ===
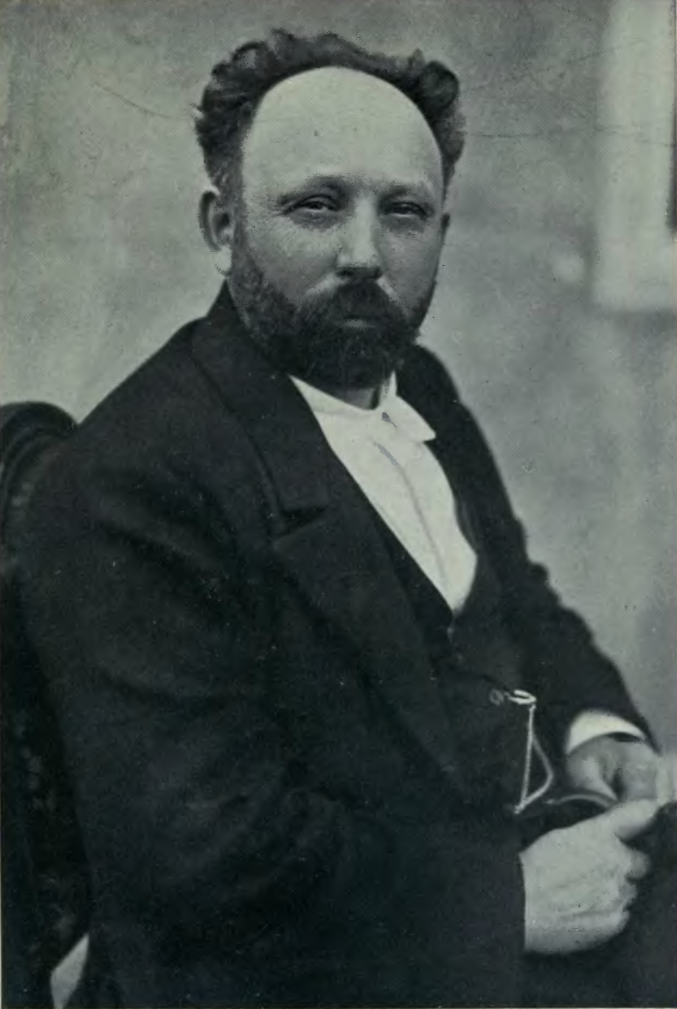
Sándor Csizmadia, commissar for agriculture in the Hungarian Soviet government, 1919.

In November 1918, Béla Kun returned from Soviet Russia with hundreds of other Hungarian communists. He established the Hungarian Communist Party and laid plans for the seizure of power, following the example set by the Bolsheviks during the Russian Revolution. Kun attempted to form a coalition of all the dissident socialist tendencies in the country and, though skeptical of the plan, anarchists reluctantly participated at the encouragement of Tibor Szamuely. As a result, Ottó Korvin, Ilona Duczyńska and György Lukács all joined the new communist party.

Tensions between workers and the republican government continued to escalate, as peasants began to seize land and establish agricultural co-operatives and urban workers occupied their factories. On February 20, 1919, protestors stormed the offices of the Social Democratic Party of Hungary's official paper, Népszava (People's Word). Police clashed with anarchist self-defense groups, resulting in the deaths of 4 police officers and the arrest of the Communist Party's leadership. While Kun and other party leaders were in prison, anarchists took a more prominent role in the organization, bringing the party line further towards the ideas of libertarian communism. In March 1919, the escalating revolutionary sentiment culminated in a general strike, which forced the resignation of the government, freed the Communist Party leaders from prison and eventually led to the establishment of the Hungarian Soviet Republic.

The Social Democrats and Communists united to establish a coalition government and a new Hungarian Socialist Party, with the left-communists Tibor Szamuely and Ottó Korvin taking positions within the government. A left opposition was quickly formed by those that did not agree on cooperating with the social democrats. This opposition included many syndicalists, who argued that the soviet republic should be organized around the workers' councils, rather than the new governing council. After anarchists and syndicalists were elected as write-in candidates during the April elections, the governing council annulled the results, ensuring that those elected came entirely from the single-party ticket. This caused a number of anarchists to finally split from the party and establish the Anarchist Union, which transformed the Almassy Palace into a self-managed social center, published newspapers and set up numerous libraries and discussion circles.

The split between the government and anarchists continued to exacerbate. The anarchist Sándor Csizmadia was dismissed as Commissar of Agriculture and Kun ordered the arrest of prominent members of the Anarchist Union, but they were released by Ottó Korvin, who began to clandestinely fund the organization and mend relations between the anarchists and left-communists. Meanwhile, Szamuely had established the "Lenin Boys" paramilitary detachment, which organized the Hungarian Red Terror against anti-communist and counter-revolutionary forces, killing hundreds during the course of the terror.

The Social Democrats eventually secured the dissolution of the Lenin Boys, but this was soon followed by a series of right-wing coup attempts. Kun responded with heightened authoritarianism, resulting in the arrest of several syndicalists. In July 1919, anarchists and syndicalists attempted to organize an insurrection against the government, but their plan was discovered and several anarchists suspected of being involved were shot. Other anarchists were helped to escape by Szamuely and Korvin, who protected them from further repression. By this time the revolution had begun to stagnate, as the governing council became divided between various factions, while workers' councils again attempted to pick up the slack.

The Soviet Republic finally collapsed following its defeat in the Hungarian–Romanian War, which re-established the Hungarian Republic under a right-wing government and led to a period of anti-communist repression known as the "White Terror", during which thousands of people died. Shortly after the 1920 Hungarian parliamentary election, the Kingdom of Hungary was restored by Miklós Horthy, who ruled the country as regent.

=== Anti-Fascist resistance in Hungary ===
The Bolsheviks had explicitly denied safe passage out of Hungary for the anarchists and left-communists, who resolved to clandestinely organise resistance to the new regime. Tibor Szamuely and Ottó Korvin were both caught by the regime, Szamuely was allegedly beaten to death by border guards, while Korvin was imprisoned and tortured. A small group of anarchists attempted to free Korvin from prison, but they too were arrested and many died in prison. Most of the remaining anarchists fled into exile, where they continued to agitate in various foreign countries. As a result, the Hungarian anarchist movement was largely suppressed for the duration of the regime, with only small, clandestine groups operating, completely disconnected from the rest of the movement. Political power in Hungary was taken up by the Unity Party, a national conservative party that began to draw closer to fascism after the ascension of Gyula Gömbös as Prime Minister of Hungary.

Left-wing ideas begun to propagate themselves again following the Hungarian entry into World War II, on the side of the Axis Powers. Some Hungarian youth were particularly drawn towards anarchism and first began to practice their ideas in relative isolation. After the Nazi occupation of Hungary, a nascent resistance movement began to organize itself, with many anarchists making contact and joining the movement. But the anarchists were not well-regarded by most of the resistance, the majority of which was made up by monarchists and communists, so they remained mostly disconnected from the bulk of the movement. In June 1944, an anarchist student group attacked a Gestapo-held town in northern Hungary, but the attack was repelled and two of the anarchists were arrested. Other anarchist actions included the arson of an army supply depot, an attack against a military plant on the border with Yugoslavia and the organization of a prison riot.

In October 1944, after Horthy had attempted to declare an armistice, the Nazi occupiers overthrew his regime and brought about the establishment of the Nazi-aligned Government of National Unity under Ferenc Szálasi and the Arrow Cross Party. This regime change saw the release of a number of anarchist political prisoners, who resolved to re-ignite the Hungarian anarchist movement after two decades of remission. Anarchist squads wearing red sashes carried out several attacks against Nazi positions around Budapest and acts of sabotage on Nazi-controlled infrastructure. The renewed anarchist activity was to the chagrin of the communist-led resistance, which insisted on the anarchist subordination to the communist leadership. This proposal was initially rejected, but after the arrest of many anarchist militants on December 7, 1944, the Hungarian anarchist movement split, with two-thirds joining the Communist Party, while only one-third remained committed to anarchist action. Anarchists subsequently led an anti-fascist riot in the middle of Budapest, the only popular uprising against the Nazi regime that had been reported by the Allies. But after a group was shot by the Nazis, the reduced anarchist movement decided an alliance with other anti-fascist resistance groups was in their best interest.

=== Under Soviet rule ===
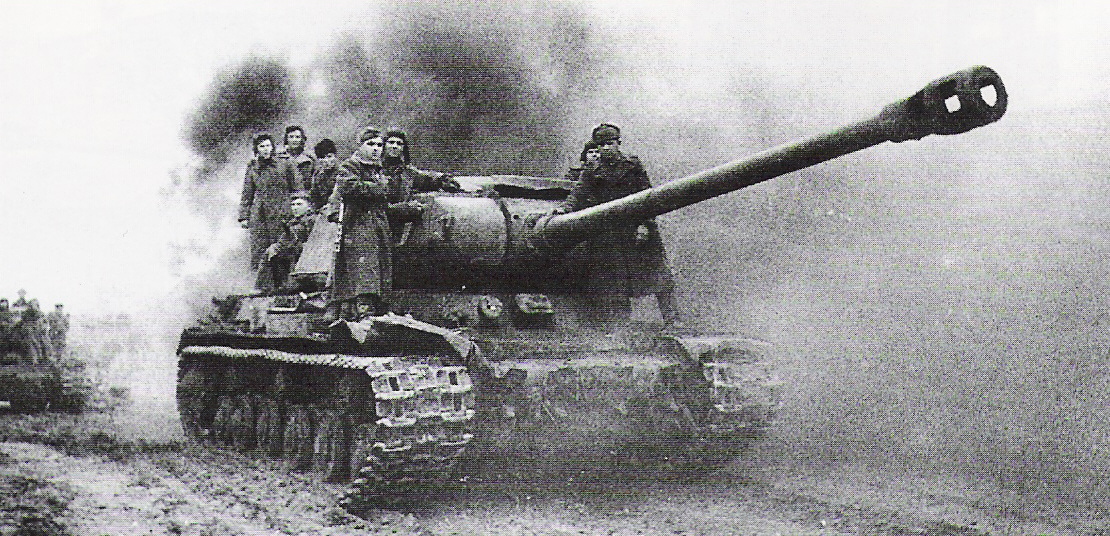
A Soviet tank JS II in action, during the battle of Budapest.

After the Siege of Budapest was broken, in July 1945, the Hungarian anarchist movement was reassembled. Three anarchist positions emerged from this assembly: one wanted the movement to be legalized, another wanted to work together with the Communists and the third wanted to continue the resistance against the newly established High National Council and the Soviet occupation. The Hungarian anarchist movement thus applied to be legalised and formally constituted, which was briefly granted, but permission was swiftly withdrawn by Kliment Voroshilov. Nevertheless, the movement continued its activity, setting up a printing press and agitating amongst workers that were disillusioned with the communists. As a result, Gábor Péter led the State Protection Authority in a purge of the anarchist movement, arresting some of the movement's leaders and forcing many anarchists into hiding. Anarchist militants launched an attack on Soviet troops in Budapest, killing several before they themselves committed suicide. Anarchists also organized the first workers' strike since the liberation of Hungary, but thirty workers were killed in the suppression led by Péter. Further communist efforts to repress the movement eventually led to the flight of the anarchist leadership from the country, with some seeking refuge in France. Most of those anarchists that resigned themselves to joining the Communist Party found themselves victims of the party's first purges.

The Communists consolidated their power over the new government, once again merging with the Social Democrats, which culminated in the 1947 coup d'état and the constitution of the Hungarian People's Republic, under the one-party rule of the Hungarian Working People's Party. The country's new leader Mátyás Rákosi developed a strong cult of personality, imitating Stalinist political and economic programs, which resulted in Hungary experiencing one of the harshest dictatorships in Europe.

Although the Hungarian Revolution of 1956 briefly overthrew Stalinist rule and brought power into the hands of workers' councils, this revolt was crushed by the Soviet forces, which established János Kádár as the new leader of Hungary. Kádár's administration implemented a policy known as Goulash Communism, a reformed system that aimed to increase living standards and introduce a regulated market economy.

=== The contemporary anarchist movement ===
The Revolutions of 1989 brought about the end of communism in Hungary and the country transitioned towards liberal democracy, complete with freedom of speech, association and assembly. This new political environment allowed for the rejuvenation of the Hungarian anarchist movement, which began to reconstitute itself throughout the 1990s. One group to come about during this period was the Barricade Collective, which analysed the growth of capitalism in Hungary as having started under Kádár's rule, and the material conditions that led to the 2006 protests in Hungary.

== See also ==
- Category:Hungarian anarchists
- List of anarchist movements by region
- Anarchism in Austria
- Anarchism in Croatia
- Anarchism in Romania
- Anarchism in Serbia

== Bibliography ==
- Tökés, Rudolf K. (1967). Béla Kun and the Hungarian Soviet Republic: The Origins and Role of the Communist Party of Hungary in the Revolutions of 1918-1919. Hoover Institution. OCLC 460518429.
- Szabó, Ervin (1982). Gyorgy Litvan; Janos M Bak (eds.). Socialism and Social Science: Selected Writings of Ervin Szabó (1877-1918). London: Routledge. ISBN 9780710090072. OCLC 949018158.
- Bozóki, András; Sükösd, Miklós (2006). Anarchism in Hungary: theory, history, legacies. New York: Columbia University Press. ISBN 9780880335683. OCLC 70044104.
