= Ignác Batthyány =

Roman Catholic bishop

- Bishop of Transylvania
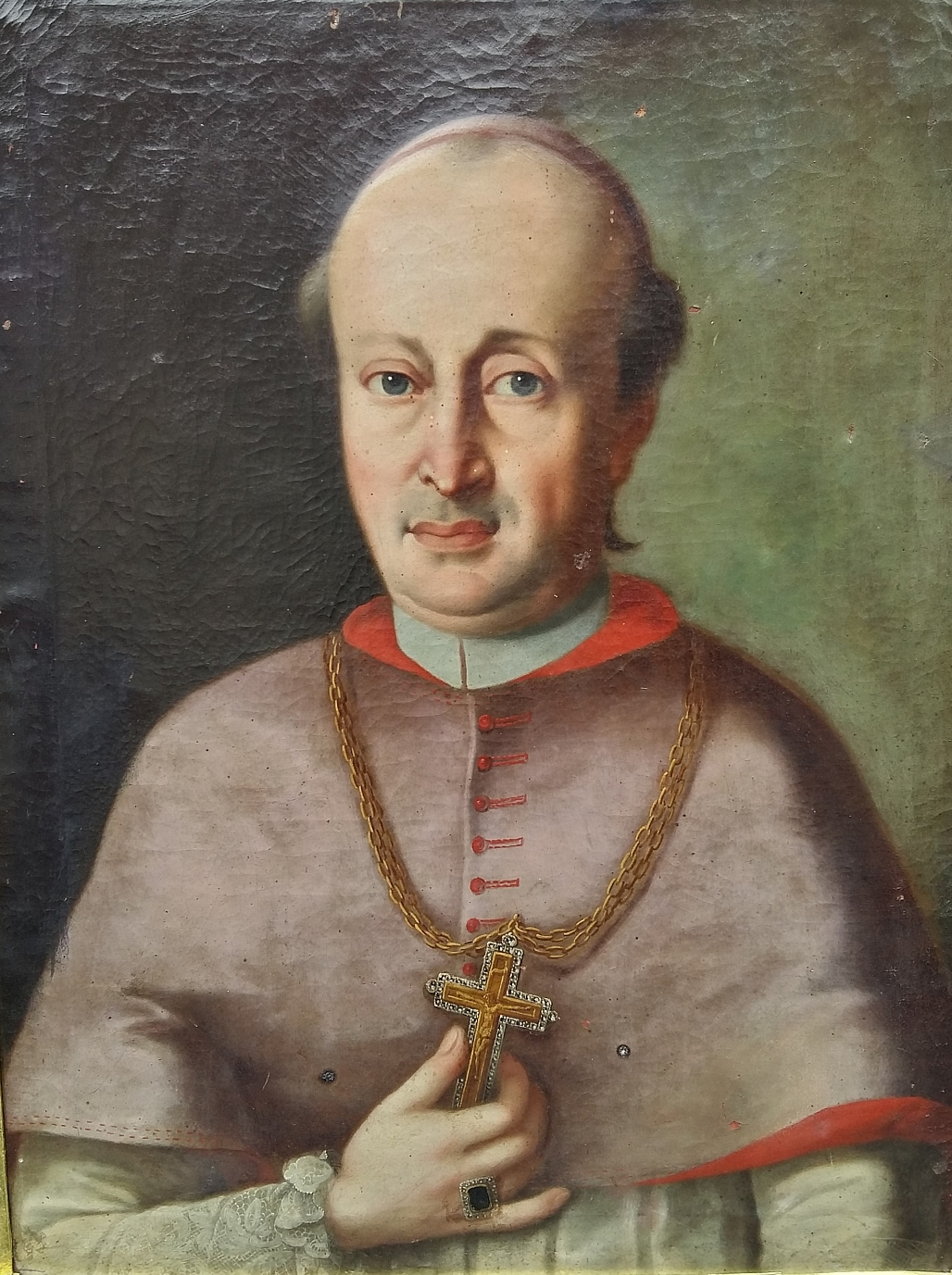
- Church: Catholic Church
- Diocese: Diocese of Transylvania
- In office: 25 June 1781 – 17 November 1798
- Predecessor: László Kollonich
- Successor: József Mártonfi

Orders
- Ordination: 16 June 1764
- Consecration: 5 August 1781 by Károly Esterházy de Galántha

Personal details
- Born: 30 June 1741 Németújvár, Kingdom of Hungary, Habsburg monarchy
- Died: 17 November 1798 (aged 57) Gyulafehérvár, Principality of Transylvania, Habsburg Monarchy

Ignác Batthyány (born 30 June 1741, Németújvár (present-day Güssing), Kingdom of Hungary; died 17 November 1798, Gyulafehérvár (present-day Alba Iulia), Principality of Transylvania) was a Roman Catholic Bishop of Transylvania.

He was librarian at the Collegium Germanicum et Hungaricum in Rome. After being appointed as bishop of Transylvania in 1781, he described himself as "the zealous protector and promoter of the sciences in Transylvania.”

Ignác Batthyány was the founder of the Batthyaneum Library in Gyulafehérvár (Alba Iulia).

Between 1792 and 1798 he commissioned the restoration of Martinuzzi Castle.
