= Anarchism in Croatia =

Anarchism in Croatia first emerged in the late 19th century within the socialist workers' movement. Anarchist tendencies subsequently spread from neighboring countries, taking root in a number of cities throughout the country. The movement experienced repression from a succession of authoritarian regimes before finally reemerging around the time of the independence of Croatia.

== History ==
In 1868, the Croatian–Hungarian Settlement brought the Kingdom of Croatia-Slavonia under the rule of Austria-Hungary, beginning a period of significant industrialization in the country, which saw the emergence of the first workers' associations in cities throughout Croatia. In 1869, the first strikes broke out in Osijek and Rijeka and there were debates over the establishment of a Croatian branch of the International Workingmen's Association. Croatian workers eventually began to express their demands in the new Workers' Friend newspaper, which was launched in 1874. Meanwhile, a split in the early Social Democratic Party led to the emergence of an anarchist faction, which extended its influence to Croatia.

=== Early Croatian anarchist movement ===
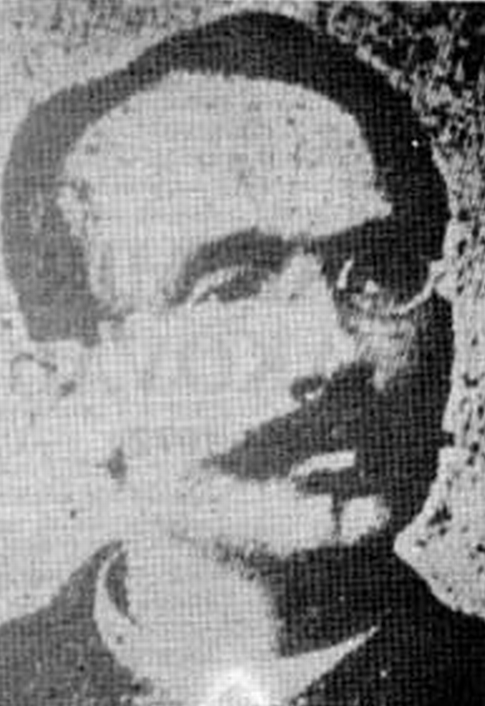
Miloš Krpan (1862–1931), teacher and founder of the first anarchist commune in Croatian history

In 1885, the Croatian worker Ignjat Graff was detained in Osijek and accused of anarchist agitation by the authorities, which seized several issues of Freiheit from him. In 1887, the Radnik newspaper began publication in Dubrovnik. In 1890, workers in Zagreb celebrated May Day for the first time. In 1894, the Hungarian anarchist Henrik Wieneke began to agitate in the city of Osijek, leading the mayor to express fear of "propaganda of the deed" and the administration of Károly Khuen-Héderváry to warn of the spread of anarchist views among state officials and the home guard.

In 1898, a socialist newspaper began to be published in Zadar and the Italian anarchist Attilio Pieroni moved to Split. The same year, the musicologist Franjo Kuhač published a work titled Anarchy, in which he criticized the emergence of Art Nouveau in Croatia. The authorities then began to point to the influences of Serbian anarchists in Osijek.

In 1900, the French anarchist Joseph Signac was expelled from Rijeka, while arrest warrants for Italian anarchists began to circulate Croatia, many wanted for their connections to the assassinations of Empress Elizabeth of Austria and Umberto I of Italy. In 1902, two Croatian anarchists were arrested and put on trial in Osijek and the authorities reported that anarchists were spreading throughout the area of Trieste, Istria and Rijeka. In 1903, several anarchists were arrested in Pula and their illicit press was seized. The next year, fifteen anarchists led a protest through the city. In 1905, a general strike broke out in Osijek, becoming the first of its kind in Croatian history and eventually forcing the government to legalize trade unions. This strike inspired another in Slavonski Brod, where Miloš Krpan propagated anarcho-syndicalist ideas, even inviting Viennese anarchists to establish a commune near the city.

In 1907, the Trieste anarchist newspaper Germinal described Split as a city revived by "a group of young rebels, freemen", while the city's police began mass arrests of anarchists. In 1909, the people of Split organized demonstrations against the murder of Francesc Ferrer. In 1912, an anarchist football club was founded in Split, who continue to exist under the name RNK Split.

Towards the end of World War I in 1918, a wave of general strikes and the strengthening of the Green Cadres led the authorities to begin writing about an environment of "general anarchy" in Croatia. In 1920, the government of the new Kingdom of Serbs, Croats and Slovenes issued the Obznana, which outlawed the activities of all socialist organizations.

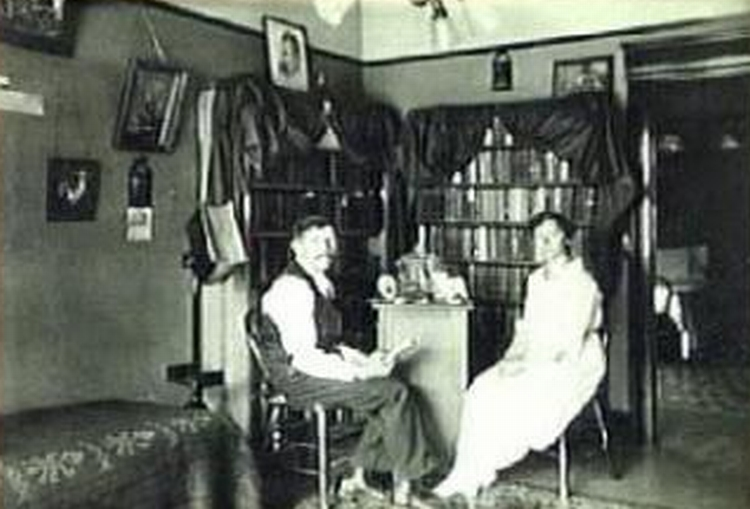
Stjepan and Hermina Fabijanović (1924, Los Angeles)

Following the March on Rome and the rise of Fascist Italy, repression intensified against anarchists. The subsequent institution of Alexander I's royal dictatorship, followed by the government of the fascist Yugoslav Radical Union, led to the repression of anarchism in Croatia, as well as the nascent Croatian calls for federalism in Yugoslavia. In the 1930s, a number of prominent Croatian anarchists, including Miloš Krpan and Stjepan Fabijanović died.

=== Anarchism in Yugoslav Croatia ===
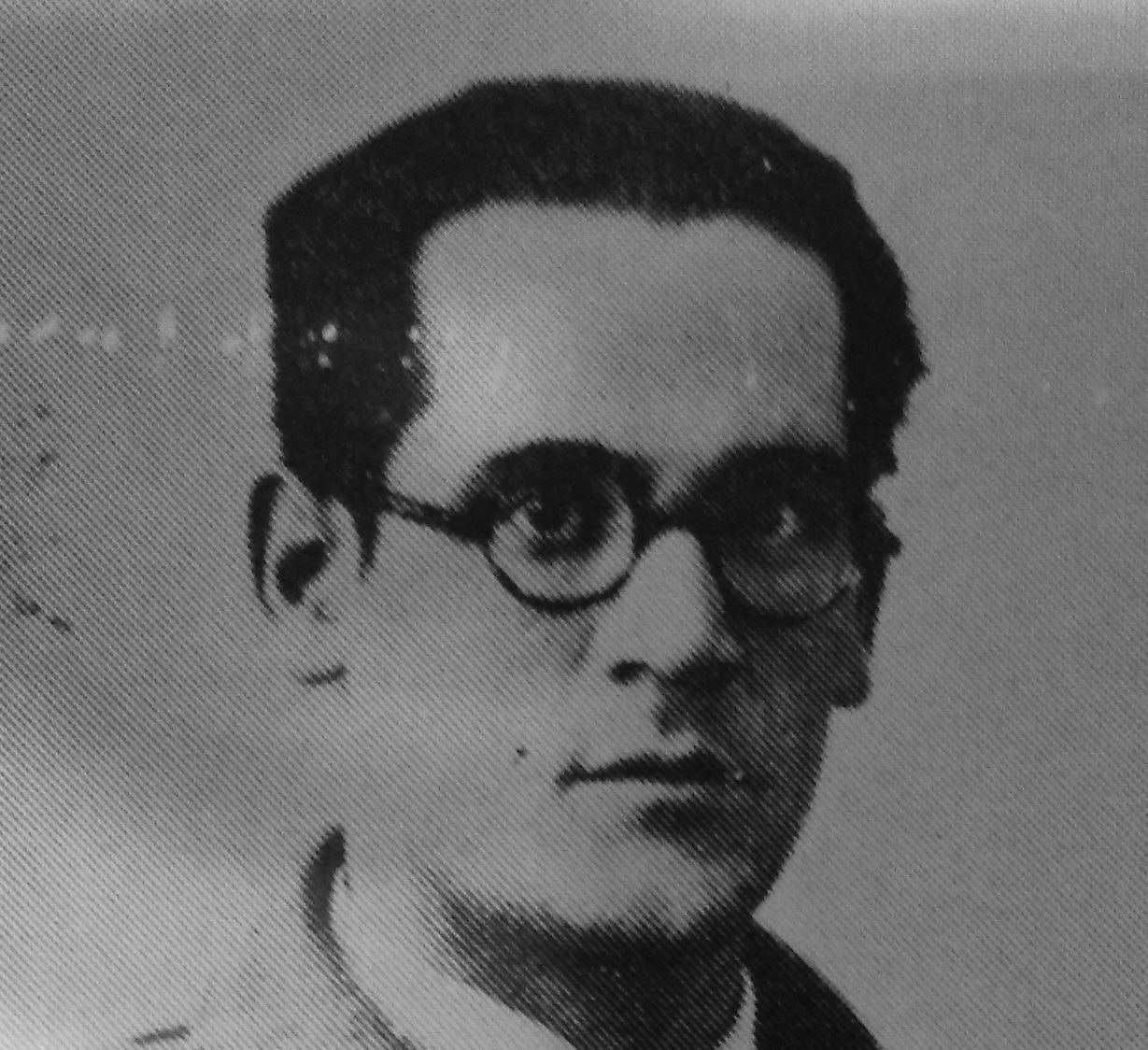
Nikola Turčinović (1911–1973), Rovinj anarchist and fighter in the Spanish Civil War

Individual anarchists continued to agitate in Croatia, with some becoming involved in the anti-fascist resistance movements during the Spanish Civil War (see Yugoslav volunteers in the Spanish Civil War) and World War II in Yugoslavia, with anarchist partisans being particularly prominent in the area of Rovinj. However, the command of the League of Communists over the partisan movement, followed by its subsequent rise to power in Yugoslavia and the constitution of the Socialist Republic of Croatia, led to the suppression of any remaining anarchist and left-communist tendencies.

The newly established government of the Socialist Federal Republic of Yugoslavia began implementing a limited form of workers' socialist self-management, directed by workers' councils. However, these were in practice still under the control of the state bureaucracy, which in some cases even introduced a market economy. As unemployment continued to rise, people began to demand a more genuine form of workers' self-management, culminating in the 1968 student demonstrations.

Following the death of Josip Broz Tito, a performative anarchist group formed in Zagreb during the 1980s. Initially nameless, it later changed its names several times, some of which included: Train Toilet Band, Svarun and Autonomija. This group mostly held limited performances and "empty demonstrations", in which members ridiculed politics by giving silent speeches and handing out black leaflets. The group eventually disbanded around the time of the breakup of Yugoslavia.

=== Contemporary anarchist movement ===
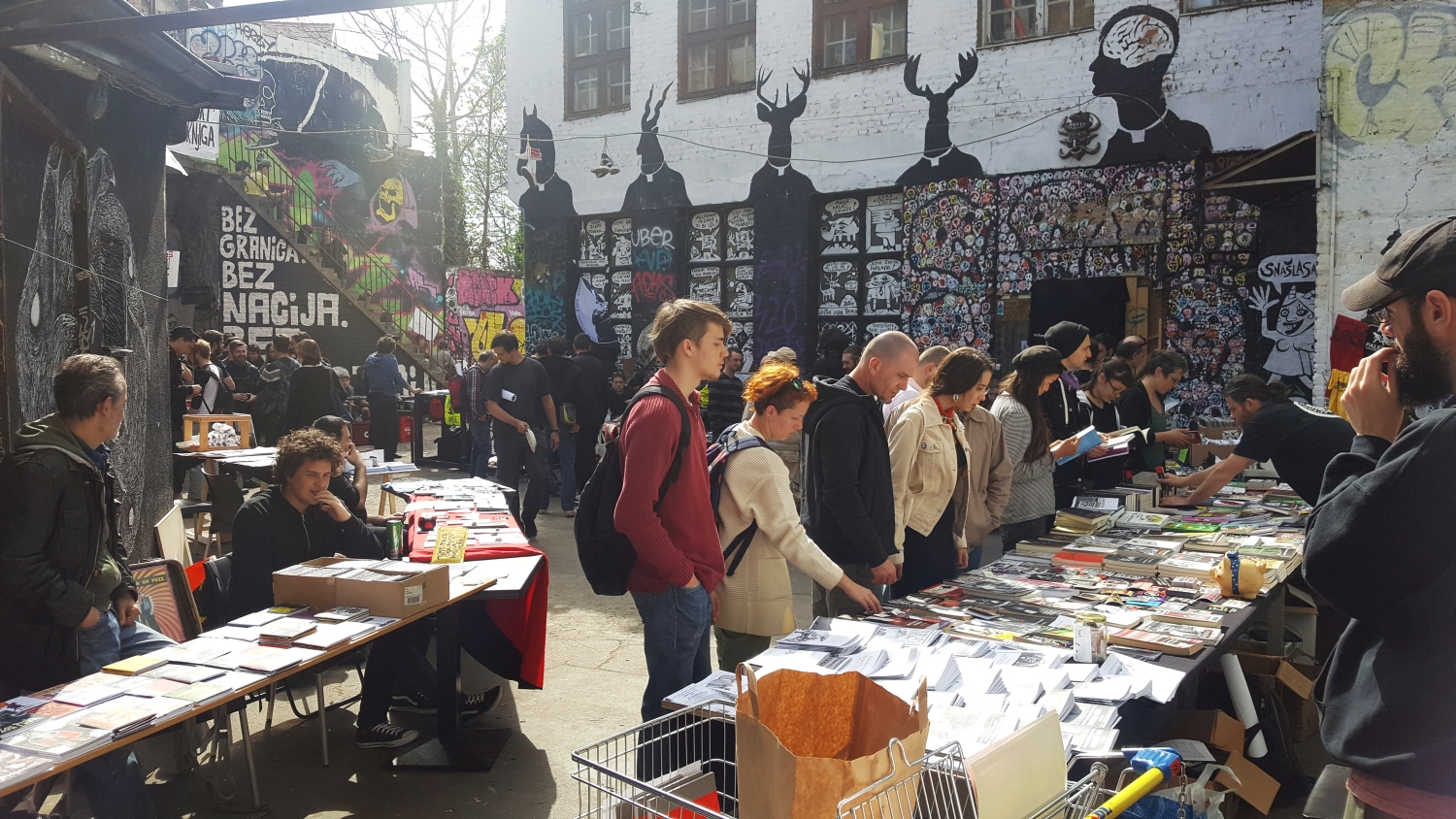
11th Balkan Anarchist Book Fair, Zagreb, April 2017

Following the independence of Croatia, the Croatian anarchist movement began to slowly reconstitute itself. Anarchists began to participate in the anti-war movement against the Croatian War of Independence. The Zagreb Anarchist-Pacifist Movement (ZAPO) was formed spontaneously to agitate against the war, holding events throughout the 1990s, before eventually dissolving itself in 2001, once the Yugoslav Wars had drawn to a close. During the 1990s, anarchism was largely subcultural, with many anarchists forming connections with Croatian NGOs and participating in the opposition movement to the government of Franjo Tuđman and the Croatian Democratic Union (HDZ). Food Not Bombs collectives also began to emerge around this time, organizing the distribution of food in cities throughout Croatia.

On October 31, 1999, Anfema (Anarchofeminist Action) was created in Zagreb, intensifying the problematization of women's issues in the anarchist movement. Anfema began to create an alternative feminist scene, as group members had argued that in institutionalized feminist associations, too many relationships were still based on hierarchy and domination, only without men. In early 2000, they published the first issue of WOMB magazine. The main activities of the group were organizing workshops and informing citizens about the problems of women in society.

At the turn of the 21st century, anarchist organizations built around class struggle began to emerge, including the Zadar Anarchist Front (ZAF) and the Anarcho-Syndicalist Confederation (ASK), which were instrumental in re-introducing anarcho-syndicalist ideas to the country. The ZAF began to translate anarchist texts into Croatian and published their own magazine Solidarity and Freedom. Around the same time, the Rijeka Anarchist Initiative was founded, as an interest group gathered around protests against the installation of radar in Učka, later taking part in other protests against NATO. However, Croatian anarchist groups largely remained localized and disconnected during the early 2000s, and these organizations eventually fell apart.

In February 2008, the Network of Anarcho-Syndicalists (MASA) was formed at a national meeting in Zadar, holding their first congress in Zagreb on April 12 of that same year, where it formally constituted its aims and structure. It was made up of local groups in Zagreb, Pula, Split, Rijeka and Zadar, with contacts in various other cities, and participated in a number of direct actions throughout Croatia.

In 2009, MASA opened the Centre for Anarchist Studies, a registered NGO formed with the intention of collecting and publishing anarchist literature, holding lectures and public discussions, and promoting the study of anarcho-syndicalist theory.

Following a number of neoliberal reforms and with the Croatian entry into the European Union on the horizon, popular discontent with the ruling HDZ government began to grow. This culminated on February 22, 2011, when protests broke out against the government, calling for the resignation of the prime minister Jadranka Kosor and early elections. By February 28, many of the protests had taken on a largely self-organized character, which led the Network of Anarcho-Syndicalists to begin participating in the protests, while also criticizing the inaction of mainstream trade unions and the potential of a new government under the Social Democratic Party (SDP). As the protests continued, MASA noted the emergence of libertarian principles among the protestors and denounced the leading opposition figures Ivan Pernar (ZZ) and Dragutin Lesar (HLSR) for having promoted the continuation of capitalism.

In 2013, the Rijeka branch of MASA left the organization to found the Network of Anarchists of Rijeka (MASA Rijeka). In June 2014, MASA Rijeka became a full member of the Federation for Anarchist Organisation (FAO) at the organization's 6th Congress in Slovenia. In January 2017, at a regular meeting of the FAO, the group confirmed its plans to expand the Network of Anarchists throughout the Croatian region, with operations planned in Istria and Kvarner.

== See also ==
- List of anarchist movements by region
- Anarchism in Bosnia and Herzegovina
- Anarchism in Hungary
- Anarchism in Italy
- Anarchism in Serbia
