= Ádám Batthyány =

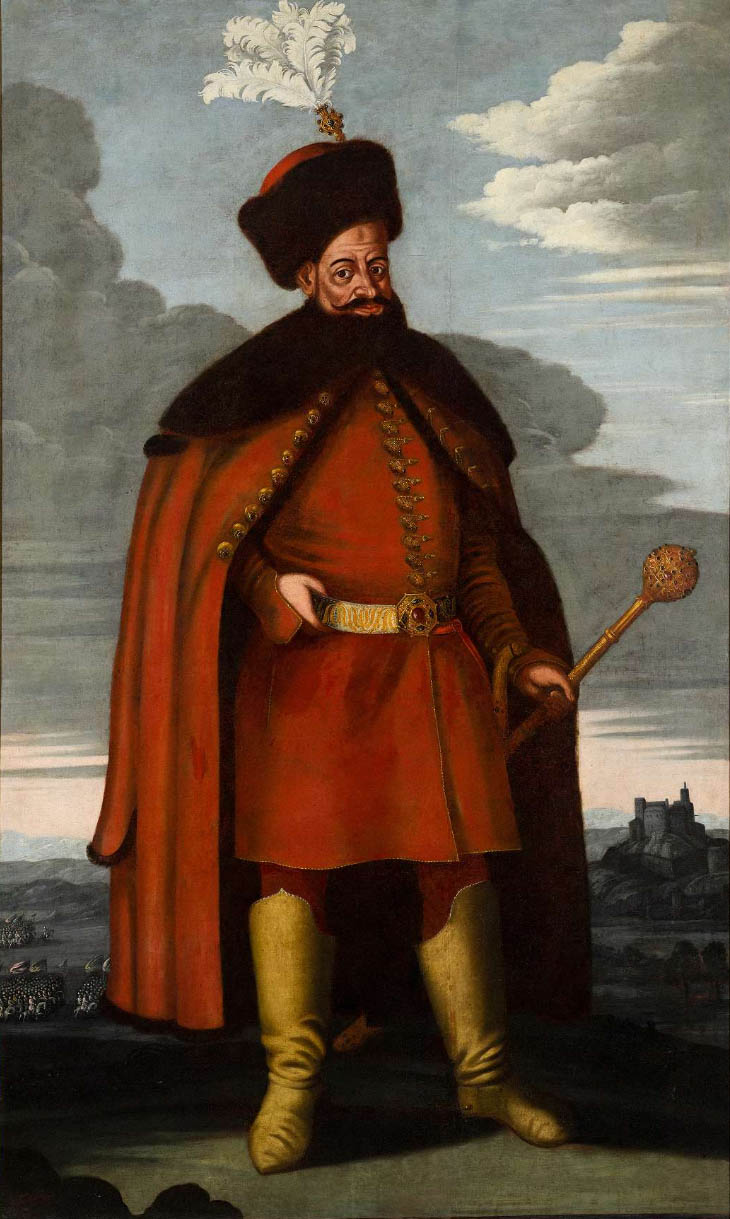
- Portrait of Ádám Batthyány, c. 1650
- Born: 1610
- Died: 1659 (aged 48–49)

Ádám Batthyány (1610–1659) was a Hungarian count of the Batthyány family. He presided over a period of religious tensions between Protestants and Catholics, which extended to his court. His father had been Calvinist, as had he, but he later became Lutheran and then in 1629 he converted to Catholicism. At court tensions over religion led Protestant servants to reportedly throw meat into wine on fast days to provoke Catholics. He also had to manage an occasionally tense border with Ottoman Empire.
