= Anarchism in Serbia =

Anarchism in Serbia has its roots in the late 19th century, when a number of Serbs studying in Switzerland came into contact with anarchist ideas and established the first Serbian socialist newspapers and organisations. Anarcho-syndicalism gained an interest in Serbia in the early 20th century, with trade unions and workers' societies being established by young Serbian socialists under the leadership of Krsta Cicvarić. Serbian anarchists within Young Bosnia participated in the assassination of Archduke Franz Ferdinand, leading to the outbreak of World War I and the repression of the Serbian anarchist movement. Libertarian tendencies in the Communist Party of Yugoslavia saw the establishment of socialist self-management in the country, and an interest in anarchism saw a resurgence among young Serbs in the late 20th century.

== History ==
Anarchism was first introduced to Serbia during the late 19th century, when the organised labour movement first began to gain an influence in the country. Živojin Žujović was among the first Serbs to adopt the anarchist ideas of Pierre-Joseph Proudhon and was credited by Trivo Inđić as the first Serbian socialist. Žujović mentored the young trade union organiser and socialist theorist Svetozar Marković. In Switzerland, a small group of Serbian socialists, including Manojlo Hrvaćanin, Pera Todorović and Jovan Žujović, formed the Southern Slavic section of Mikhail Bakunin's Anti-Authoritarian International. In 1872, the Serbian socialists met for a congress in Zurich, where they drew up the statutes for a socialist political party. In 1874, Todorović established Rad, the first socialist newspaper in the Serbian language. In 1875, Hrvaćanin, along with Vasa Pelagić and Kosta Ugrinić, participated in the Herzegovina uprising against the Ottoman Empire.

By the turn of the 20th century, anarchist ideas had been consciously adopted by Mita Cenić, Dragiša Stanojević, Pera Todorović and Jovan Žujović. A number of Serbians came under the influence of anarcho-syndicalism, which had been brought in from Hungary via Vojvodina by Krosto Iskruljev. In Paris, Milorad Popović founded a Yugoslav workers' society; he then moved to Budapest, where he published a socialist newspaper in the Serbian language. In 1904, he finally returned to Serbia, where he established a number of trade unions. The leading figure of Serbian anarcho-syndicalism during this period was Krsta Cicvarić, who published the newspapers Hleb i Sloboda in 1905 and Radnicka Borba in 1907; he also organised anarchist workers' groups and later wrote his own Anarchist Programme in 1909. Anarcho-syndicalist members of the Serbian Social Democratic Party (SSDP), including Nedeljko Divac, Vasa Knežević, Sima Marković, Vlajko Martinović, were expelled from the SSDP over their advocacy of direct action.

Following the Austro-Hungarian annexation of Bosnia, the anarchist-inspired group Young Bosnia began carrying out a campaign of assassinations against imperial officials. Its leader Bogdan Žerajić, who was influenced by Peter Kropotkin, unsuccessfully attempted to assassinate governor Marijan Varešanin. Inspired by Žerajić, several members of Young Bosnia, including Nedeljko Čabrinović, Danilo Ilić and Gavrilo Princip, carried out the assassination of Archduke Franz Ferdinand, which caused the outbreak of World War I. At their trial, Čabrinović explicitly declared anarchism to have motivated his participation in the assassination. Another anarchist member of Young Bosnia, Vladimir Gaćinović, affiliated with Russian anarchist and socialist exiles before his own assassination in 1917.

After World War I, the establishment of the Kingdom of Yugoslavia under the authoritarian rule of Alexander I resulted in the repression of the Serbian anarchist movement. Sima Marković joined the Communist Party of Yugoslavia and became its political secretary, but he was later killed during the Great Purge due to his personal disagreements with Stalinism. Around 200 Yugoslavs also volunteered to fight in the Spanish Civil War, many of whom were influenced by libertarian socialism. After World War II, the establishment of the Socialist Federal Republic of Yugoslavia prevented the re-emergence of the anarchist movement, although libertarian ideas were incorporated into its system of socialist self-management. Following the 1968 student demonstrations in Yugoslavia, Serbia saw a renewed interest in anarchist ideas, with the works of Proudhon, Bakunin and Kropotkin once again circulating among the younger generation.

== See also ==
- Category:Serbian anarchists
- List of anarchist movements by region
- Anarchism in Bosnia and Herzegovina
- Anarchism in Romania
