= Anarchism in Bosnia and Herzegovina =

Anarchism in Bosnia and Herzegovina first emerged from left-wing currents of the anti-imperialist movement, gaining traction as a tendency in the revolutionary movement Young Bosnia. Following assassination of Archduke Franz Ferdinand and World War I, Bosnia and Herzegovina was brought under a series of authoritarian regimes, before gaining independence in 1992. In the post-independence climate of rising nationalism and income inequality, anarchism re-emerged as part of the nascent anti-nationalist and anti-capitalist movements of the 21st century.

== History ==
=== Anti-imperialist movement ===
Anarchism first emerged in the country from left-wing currents during the Herzegovina uprising against the Ottoman Empire in 1875. This movement was spearheaded by the socialist Vladimir Gaćinović and received support from Bosnian and Italian anarchists, including Errico Malatesta.

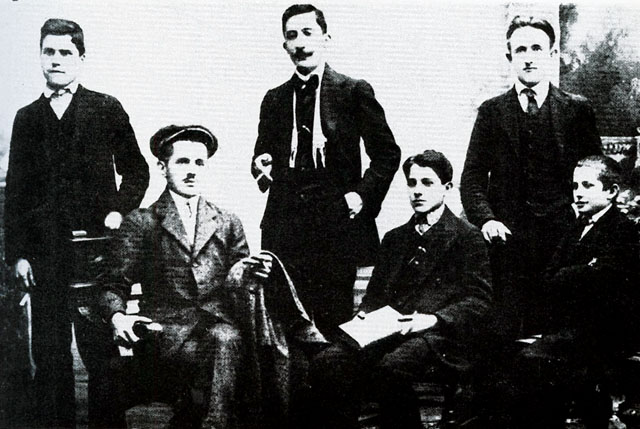
Members of Young Bosnia, a Yugoslavist revolutionary movement that drew inspiration from anarchism.

The subsequent establishment of Austro-Hungarian rule over Bosnia and Herzegovina eventually reached its apex with the country's formal annexation in 1908. Meanwhile, the May Coup in Kingdom of Serbia had led to a rise in Yugoslav nationalism in the Balkans. This culminated with the establishment of Young Bosnia, a youth revolutionary movement dedicated to the liberation of Bosnia and Herzegovina from Austria-Hungary. Its main ideologist was Vladimir Gaćinović, who was inspired by anarchists of the Russian diaspora, including the works of Mikhail Bakunin and Peter Kropotkin, as well as the actions of the Narodnaya Volya organization. He proposed propaganda of the deed in the form of tyrannicide, as a method of revolutionary political struggle to achieve Bosnian national liberation. These ideas were first put into practice by Bogdan Žerajić, himself also a supporter of Kropotkin's ideas, who attempted to assassinate the Governor of Bosnia and Herzegovina Marijan Varešanin, but failed and subsequently committed suicide.

Žerajić's example was followed by several more attempted assassinations of Austro-Hungarian officials, the most significant of which was the assassination of Archduke Franz Ferdinand in Sarajevo. On 28 June 1914, members of Young Bosnia stationed themselves along the route of Franz Ferdinand's motorcade and one by one attempted on his life. The first attempt was by the Bosnian anarcho-syndicalist Nedeljko Čabrinović, who threw a bomb at the Archduke's vehicle, but it failed to detonate in time and Čabrinović's suicide attempt also failed. Despite Čabrinović's failure, one of the Bosnian militants was successful - Gavrilo Princip shot the Archduke and his wife with a revolver, killing both. At their trial, the Young Bosnians declared that the assassination was a reflection of their anarchist beliefs. Čabrinović and Princip were both sentenced to 20 years in prison, but the fallout from the assassination had already led directly to the beginning of World War I. In prison, the German psychologist Martin Pappenheim interviewed Princip about what drove him to assassinate the Archduke. Among the assassin's literature included a variety of anarchist works, including Kropotkin's The Conquest of Bread. Princip and Čabrinović both died in prison from their illnesses, shortly before the war drew to an end.

=== Yugoslavia ===
Following the end of World War I, Bosnia and Herzegovina was unified into the Kingdom of Yugoslavia, which ruled as a right-wing dictatorship until the outbreak of World War II. Bosnia and Herzegovina was then brought under the totalitarian rule of the fascist Ustaše, which pursued a campaign of genocide against the country's Serbian, Jewish and Romani people, as well as anti-fascist or dissident Croats and Bosniaks. This was resisted by the Yugoslav Partisans, who following their victory established the Socialist Federal Republic of Yugoslavia and brought the country under the control of the Communist Party. Despite repressions against dissident workers, by the 1950s, many workers managed to implement a system of socialist self-management, which the state allowed in a limited form.

=== Post-independence ===
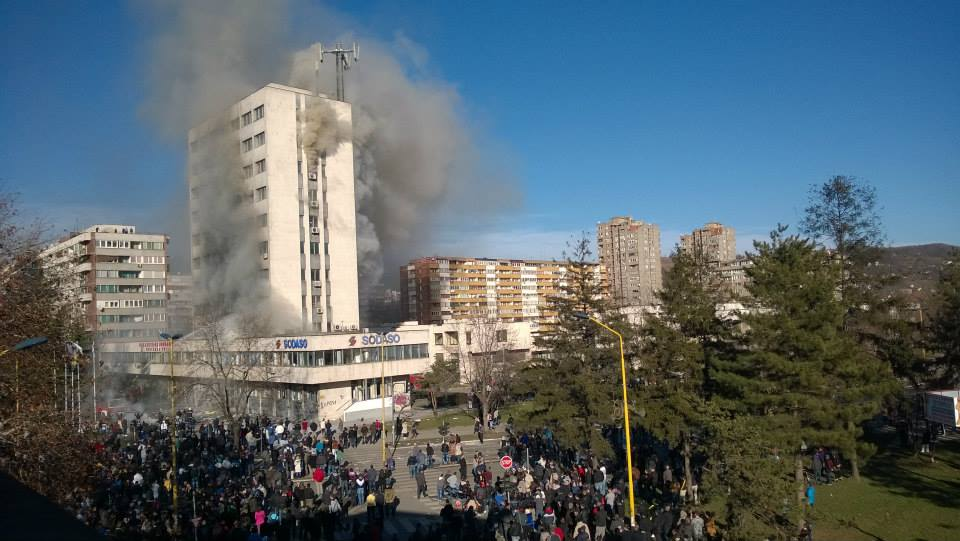
The Tuzla Canton Government Building in flames, during the 2014 unrest in Bosnia and Herzegovina

The death of Tito and the subsequent breakup of Yugoslavia led to an armed conflict in the newly independent Republic of Bosnia and Herzegovina. The Dayton Agreement which ended the war partitioned the state between two federal entities: the Federation of Bosnia and Herzegovina and the Republika Srpska. The country was thus completely divided along ethnic lines, exacerbating the rise of nationalism and income inequality.

Following the outbreak of the Bosnian War, the city of Tuzla found itself under siege by the Republik Srpska, preventing food and fuel from entering the city. In December 1993, Swedish anarchist Eva X Moberg led a campaign by International Workers Aid (IWA) to transport supplies to Tuzla, organising a "Labour Convoy" (Swedish: Arbetarkonvojen) with the aid of unions from several different countries. They quickly hit administrative hurdles, as Swedish NGOS insisted that the IWA unload its supplies at the UNHCR warehouse "like everybody else". They refused, as they wanted to establish direct contact with the people that would be receiving the supplies. Moberg travelled to Tuzla several times, later reporting that the IWA organised 30 supply convoys during the course of the war. During this time, she wrote a column for Aftonbladet, in which she publicised the situation in Bosnia to Swedish readers and raised the IWA's own profile in the process. By the end of Yugoslav Wars, the IWA's presence in Tuzla wound to a close.

This new status quo once again gave rise to anarchism within the country, after having been suppressed for nearly a century of authoritarian rule by various different parties. The rise of the Dosta movement from internet forums to public meetings brought about a form of libertarian organizing that transcended ethnic divisions. As it grew, it began to confront social and economic issues, even beginning to take direct action themselves. After the 2008 financial crisis, a method of organizing around direct democratic assemblies known as plenums. These plenums were one of the primary modes of organizing during the 2014 unrest in Bosnia and Herzegovina, in which anarchists participated. The protests took on a fundamentally anti-nationalist character, with the slogan "Death to nationalism!" being graffiti'd on the walls of Sarajevo.

On 19 May 2020, Bosnian anarchist and anti-fascist activist Haris Pendić was arrested for publishing a YouTube video in which he, using extremely harsh language, denounced Bosnia's leading Catholic Church figure, Archbishop of Vrhbosna Cardinal Vinko Puljić. Pendić was motivated to produce such a video by Archbishop's decision to hold a memorial Mass for executed soldiers of the pro-Nazi Independent State of Croatia, an act which was strongly condemned by the Bosnian public as an attempt of historical revisionism and rehabilitation of Ustashas and Nazism. Subsequent public debate on the video triggered even stronger verbal clashes between Haris Pendić and Croat and Bosniak nationalists and led to Pendić's two further arrests.

== See also ==
- Category:Bosnia and Herzegovina anarchists
- List of anarchist movements by region
- Anarchism in Croatia
- Anarchism in Serbia
- 2014 unrest in Bosnia and Herzegovina
