= Ádám Wenzel, 2nd Prince Batthyány-Strattmann =

18th Century Hungarian magnate

Ádám Wenzel, 2nd Prince Batthyány-Strattmann (27 March 1722 – 25 October 1787) was a Hungarian magnate, chief bailiff and landowner from the noble Batthyány family.

== Early life ==
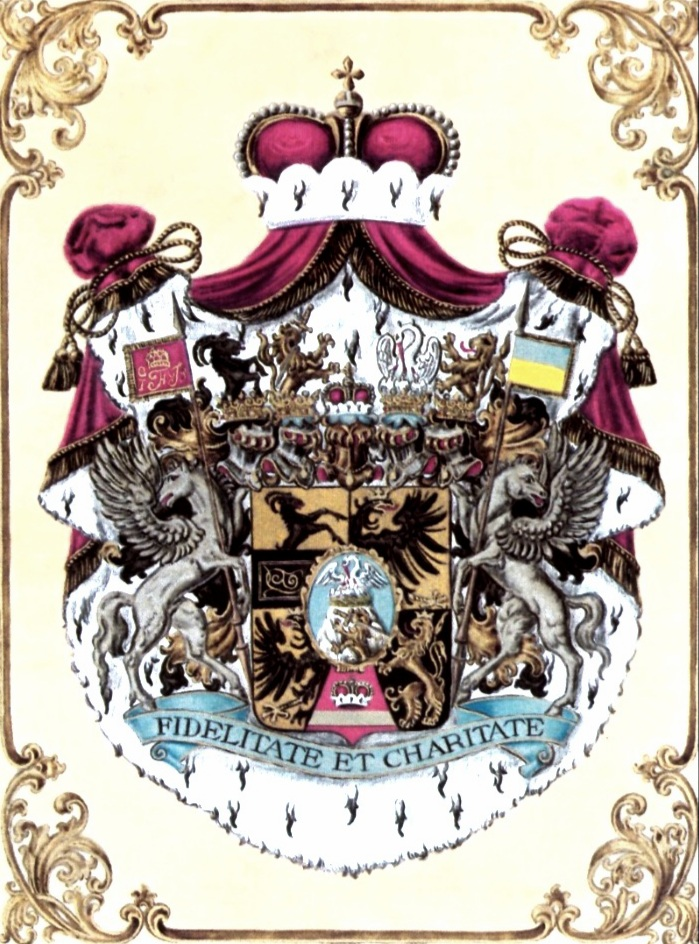
The coat of arms of the Princes Batthyány-Strattmann

Batthyány-Strattmann was born on 27 March 1722 in Vienna where his parents lived at the Palais Schönborn-Batthyány. He was the eldest son of Countess Therese Kinsky von Wchinitz und Tettau (1700–1775) and Lajos Batthyány of Bicske Castle, who served as the 101st Palatine of the Kingdom of Hungary. His elder sister, Countess Maria Antonia Batthyány, married their uncle Károly József Batthyány, as his third wife. Among his brother was Count József Batthyány, a Cardinal and Prince-primate of Hungary, Count Tódor "Theodor" Batthyány, an industrial (who married Countess Philippine Esterházy de Galántha, a daughter of Count Ferenc Esterházy), and Count Fülöp "Philipp" Batthyány, who also joined the military. Besides Vienna, the family also regularly spent time on their Hungarian estates, especially at Schloss Rechnitz and Schloss Körmend, which was his father's main seat and which later became the center of the family's princely line.

His paternal grandparents were Ádám II Batthyány and Eleonore Batthyány-Strattmann. His maternal grandparents were Wenceslaus Norbert, Count of Kinsky and, his second wife, Baroness Maria Anna Theresia von Nesselrode-Ehreshoven. Among his maternal family were uncles Franz Ferdinand, Count of Kinsky and Philip Kinsky of Wchinitz and Tettau, both of whom served as Bohemian High Chancellor, and Stephan Wilhelm, 1st Prince Kinsky of Wchinitz and Tettau.

== Career ==
In 1763, Empress Maria Theresa elevated his uncle, Károly József Batthyány, to the Bohemian princely status and to the Hungarian princely status. The following year, he was further elevated to the rank of Imperial Prince in 1764. As all of his uncle's direct descendants died during his lifetime, his princely title passed to Ádám Wenzel, who became the 2nd Prince Batthyány-Strattmann in 1772. Since Ádám Wenzel inherited both the majorat of the Counts of Batthyány and that of the Counts of Strattmann from his father, the line of the family has since borne the name Batthyány-Strattmann.

His uncle's Hungarian territories were divided among Ádám Wenzel's brothers: Tódor received Siklós, Üszög, and Mozsgómit (with the district of Somodor), while Fülöp received the dominion of Bóly. Since József, as Cardinal-Archbishop, had no descendants, he received his inheritance in monetary compensation, receiving a total of 360,000 guilders from his brothers. His uncle's widow and Ádám Wenzel's sister, Antonia, received Trautmannsdorf as her widow's residence and a lifelong right of residence in the Batthyány Palace.

== Personal life ==
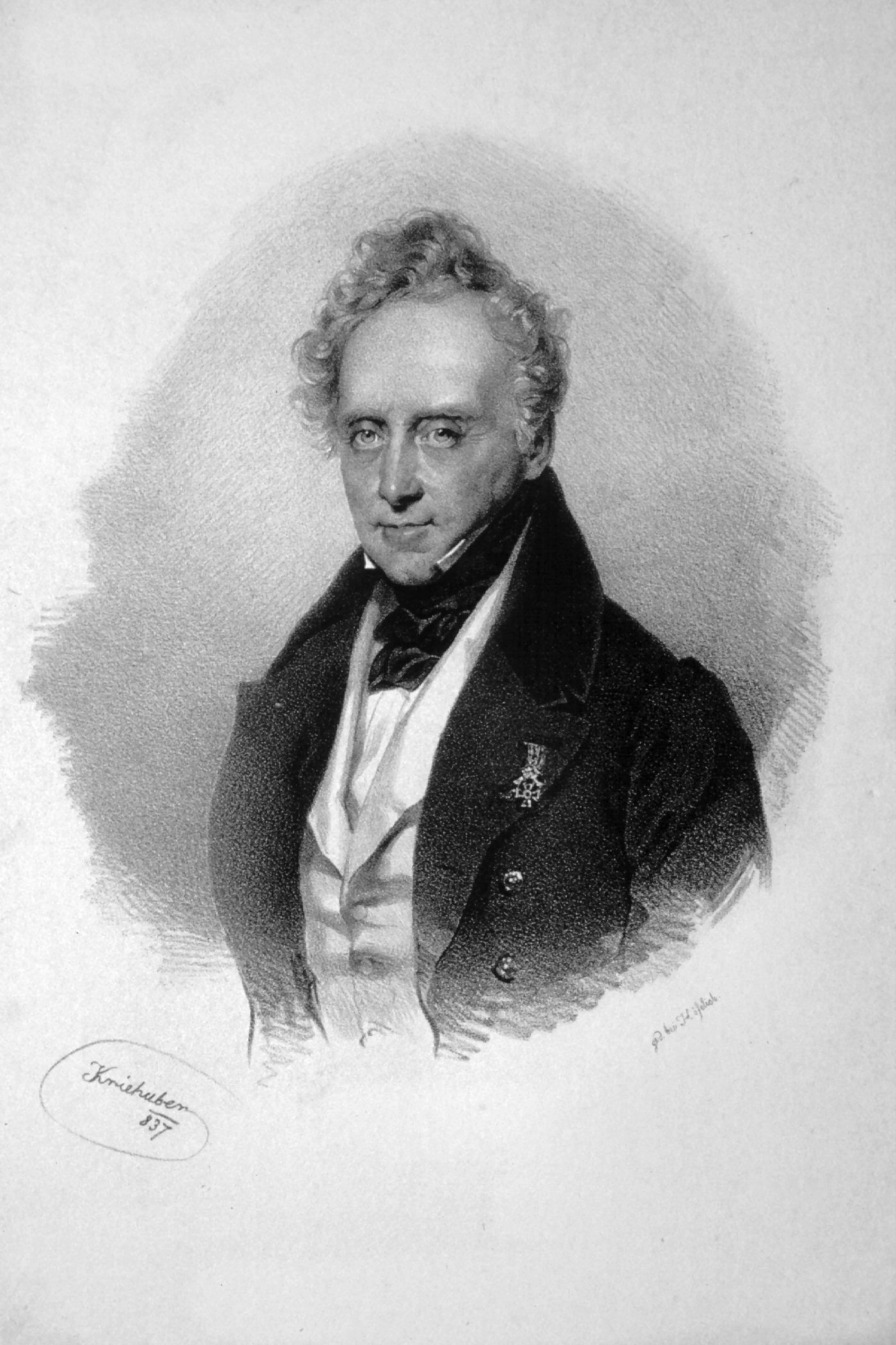
Engraving of his grandson, Fülöp "Philip", 4th Prince Batthyány-Strattmann

Batthyány was married to Countess Mária Terézia Illésházy de Illésháza (1734–1807), the eldest daughter of Count József Illésházy and, his second wife, Countess Petronella von Abensberg und Traun. Together, they were the parents of:

- Lájos, 3rd Prince Batthyány-Strattmann (1753–1806), who married Countess Franciska Seraphina Pálffy ab Erdõd, a daughter of Chancellor Count Miklós Palffy ab Erdöd and Countess Maria Anna Sidonia von Althann. After her death in 1778, he married Countess Maria Elisabeth von Pergen, a daughter of Count Johann Baptist von Pergen and Countess Regina von Walsegg.
- József Batthyány-Strattmann (1759–1762), who died young.
- Maria Antonia Batthyány-Strattmann (1762–1794), who married Count József Erdődy de Monyorókerék et Monoszló, son of Count János Nepomuk Erdődy and Countess Maria Terezia Anna Palffy de Erdöd.

The Prince died at Rovereto on 25 October 1787.

=== Descendants ===
Through his son Lájos, he was a grandfather of Fülöp, 4th Prince Batthyány-Strattmann (1781–1870) and Count János Batthyány-Strattmann (1784–1865), who married Mária Terézia Esterházy de Galántha.
