= Károly József Batthyány =

Hungarian general and field marshal

Prince Károly József Batthyány
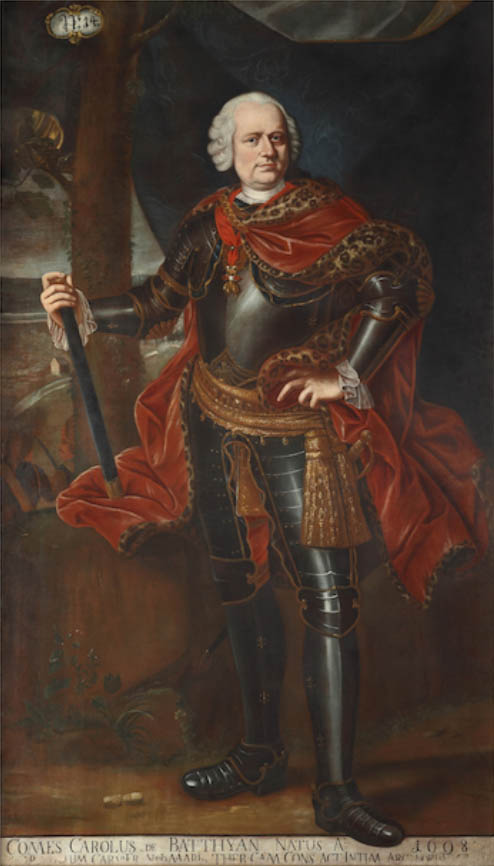
- Portrait painting of Prince Karl Joseph of Batthyány-Strattmann

Ban of Croatia
- In office 16 March 1743 – 6 July 1756
- Monarch: Maria Theresa
- Preceded by: György Branyng
- Succeeded by: Ferenc Nádasdy

Personal details
- Born: 28 April 1697 Rohonc, Kingdom of Hungary
- Died: 15 April 1772 (aged 74) Vienna, Archduchy of Austria
- Spouse(s): Countess Maria Anna Barbara von Waldstein-Wartenberg (m. 1721; died 1724) Countess Maria Theresa von Strattmann-Peuerbach (m. 1726; died 1760) Countess Maria Antonia Batthyány (died 1772)
- Relations: Theodor von Strattman (grandfather)
- Children: 12
- Parent(s): Ádám II Batthyány; Eleonore Batthyány-Strattmann

Military service
- Allegiance: Holy Roman Empire
- Rank: Field marshal

Károly József, 1st Prince Batthyány (Hungarian: Batthyány Károly József; German: Karl Josef Graf Batthyány; 28 April 1697 – 15 April 1772) was a Hungarian nobleman, general and field marshal in the service of the Habsburg monarchy. A trusted commander of Prince Eugene of Savoy, he fought in the wars against the Ottoman Empire and France, distinguishing himself in the Battle of Pfaffenhofen (1745) during the War of the Austrian Succession. From 1743 to 1756 he served as Ban of Croatia and in 1764 he was elevated by Maria Theresa to the rank of Prince of the Holy Roman Empire.

== Early life ==
Prince Károly József was born on 28 April 1697 in Rohonc into one of the most important noble families in the Habsburg monarchy, the Hungarian Batthyány family of which he belonged to the older, Christoph line of the family, named after his paternal grandfather. He was the second son of Count Ádám II Batthyány (1662–1703) and his wife Countess Eleonore Batthyány-Strattmann (1673–1741). His father, as Ban of Croatia, held a high political office in the Habsburg Empire. His mother, Eleonore, was a close confidante of Prince Eugene of Savoy. Károly József's older brother, Lajos Batthyány, became Hungarian Court Chancellor and Palatine under Empress Maria Theresa.

His paternal grandparents were Christoph II Batthyány and Maria-Anna Horváth de Palocsa. His maternal grandparents were Theodor Heinrich von Strattmann und Peuerbach and Mechtilde von Mollard.

== Career ==
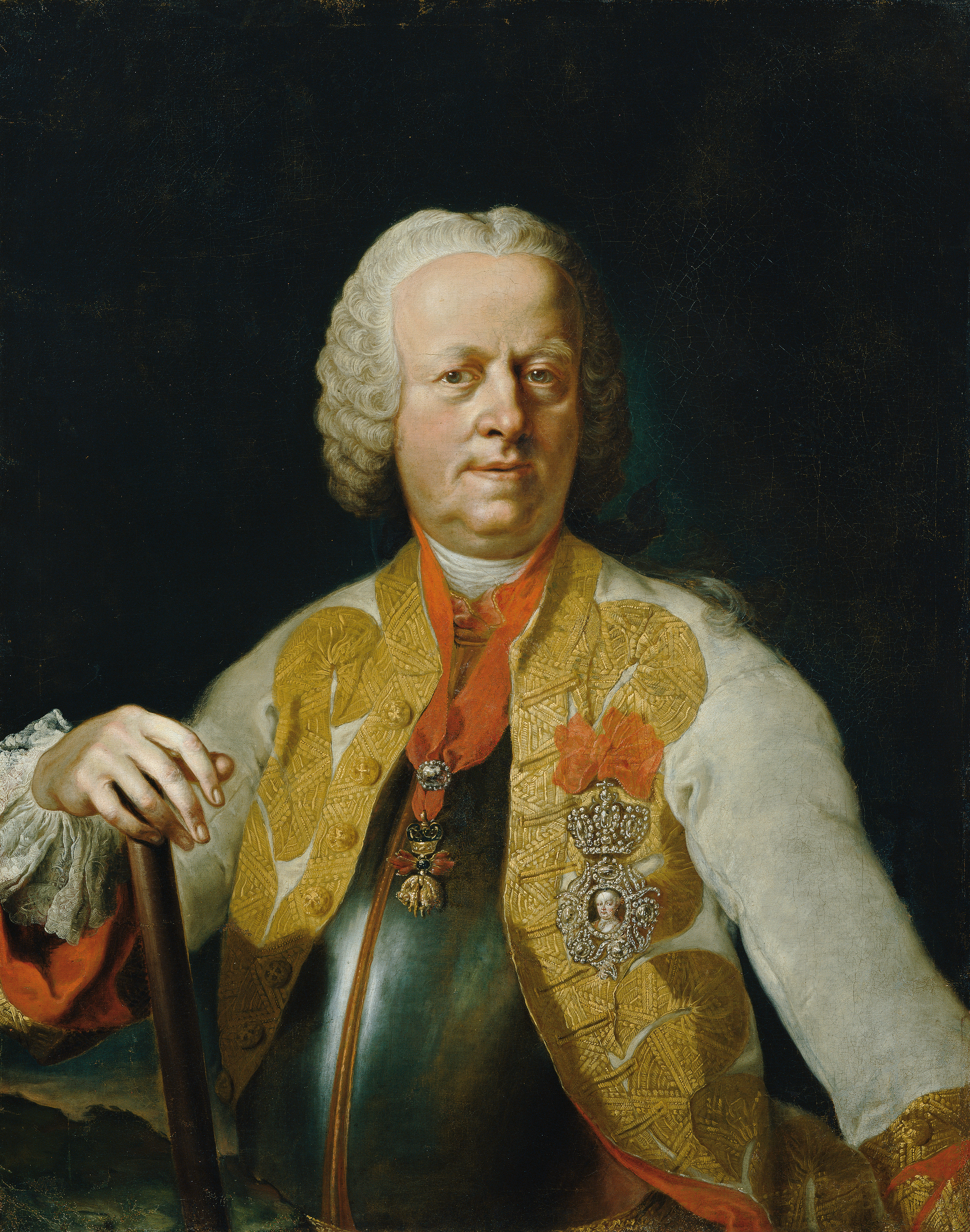
Portrait of Prince Batthyány by Franz Xaver Palko, c. 1760

He served in the Austrian army under Prince Eugene of Savoy in the war against the Turks, and participated in the battles in Peterwardein, Temeswar and Belgrade.

He commanded in 1734, as a general Imperial troops at the Rhine against France, and in 1737 against the Turks. From 1739 to 1740, he was the envoy at the Berlin Court, but returned, however, after the outbreak of the First Silesian War with Prussia.

In the War of Austrian Succession (1744), he served again as a corps commander. He faced the French under General Ségur in the Battle of Pfaffenhofen on 15 April 1745. In spite of numerical inferiority, he won a huge victory. Batthyány then united forces with Field Marshal Otto Ferdinand von Abensberg und Traun, defeated the French again and forced them back over the Rhine.

In 1746, he served under the command of Charles of Lorraine in Belgium and took part in the Battle of Rocoux, in 1747. Serving under the command of the Duke of Cumberland, he executed an exemplary withdrawal in Lauffeldt.

In 1763, he was elevated to the Bohemian princely status and to the Hungarian princely status. On 3 January 1764, Empress Maria Theresa elevated him to the rank of Imperial Prince. He later served as an advisor to the crown prince and later Emperor Joseph II of Austria.

== Personal life ==
Batthyány was married three times. His first marriage was on 10 August 1721 to Countess Maria Anna Barbara von Waldstein-Wartenberg (1693-1724), the widow of Count Ernst Kuenburg. Before her unexpected death in 1724, they were the parents of:

- Eugen Franz Johann Joseph Batthyány (1722–1742), Royal Hungarian Chamberlain.
- Marie Elisabeth Ursula Batthyány (1723–1724), who died young.

His second marriage was in 1726 to his cousin Countess Maria Theresa von Strattmann-Peuerbach (1708-1760), the heir of his maternal uncle, Count Gerhard Wilhelm von Strattmann und Peuerbach. Before her death in 1760, they were the parents of ten children, including:

- Marie Eleanor Batthyány (1727–1727), who died young.
- Heinrich Theodor Kornelius Johann Nepomuk Batthyány (1732–1733), who died young.
- Maria Anna Walburga Batthyány (1733–1734), who died young.
- Maria Anna Walburga Batthyány (1735–1752)
- Maria Anna Ottilia Batthyány (1736–1752)
- Maria Gabriela Anna Johanna Nepomuzena Franziska de Paula Eva Leonarda Batthyány (1742–1747), who died young.
- Maria Anna Kajetana Nepomuzena Franziska de Paula Walburga Jozsefa Leonarda Eva Batthyány (1744–1747), who died young.
- Vilmos Batthyány (1747–1747), who died young.

His third marriage was to Countess Maria Antonia Batthyány von Német-Ujvár (1720-1797), the daughter of his elder brother Lajos. They didn't have any children together, but Antonia brought three children into the marriage: Count Lajos Erdödy (1747–1777), Theresia Erdödy, and Jozsefa Erdödy.

He spent his old age in Vienna, where he died in 1772, at the age of 72.

=== Succession ===
Since all of Károly József's direct descendants died during his lifetime, his princely title passed to his elder brother Lajos's descendants. Lajos's son Ádám Wenzel (1722–1787) became the 2nd Prince Batthyány-Strattmann in 1772, and his son Lájos (1753–1807) became the 3rd Prince Batthyány-Strattmann in 1787. Since Ádám Wenzel inherited both the majorat of the Counts of Batthyány and that of the Counts of Strattmann from his father, the formerly Princely line of the family has since borne the name Batthyány-Strattmann. The formerly comital lines of the family are called Batthyány.

After his death, Károly József's Hungarian territories were divided among his nephews – the brothers of the 2nd Prince: Tódor "Theodor" received Siklós, Üszög, and Mozsgómit with the district of Somodor, while Fülöp "Philipp" received the dominion of Bóly. Since the third brother, József, as Cardinal-Archbishop, had no descendants, he received his inheritance in monetary compensation, receiving a total of 360,000 guilders from his brothers. Károly József's widow, Antonia, received Trautmannsdorf as her widow's residence and a lifelong right of residence in the Batthyány Palace.

== Sources ==
- Wilhelm Edler von Janko: Batthyány, Karl Josef. In: Allgemeine Deutsche Biographie (ADB). Bd. 2, S. 133–134.
- "Biographisches Lexikon zur Geschichte Südosteuropas". Biographisches Lexikon zur Geschichte Südosteuropas (in German).

Preceded by Wenzel Anton, Prince of Kaunitz	Authorized minister in the Austrian Netherlands (plenipotentiary); 1746–1747	Succeeded by Marchese Antoniotto Botta Adorno
