= Batthyány =

Hungarian magnate family

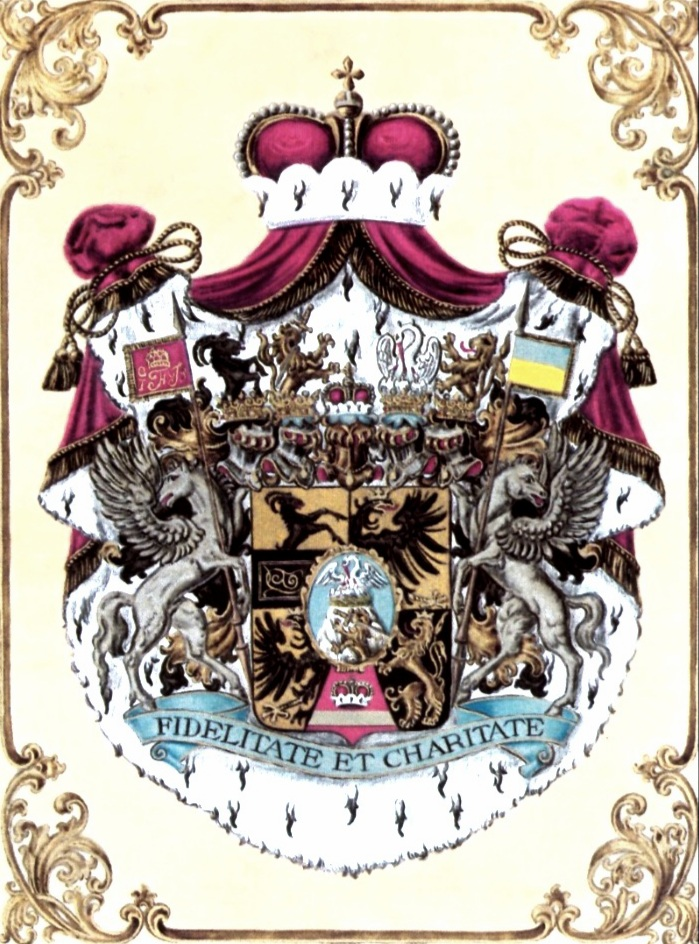
Coat of arms of Princes of Batthyány-Strattmann

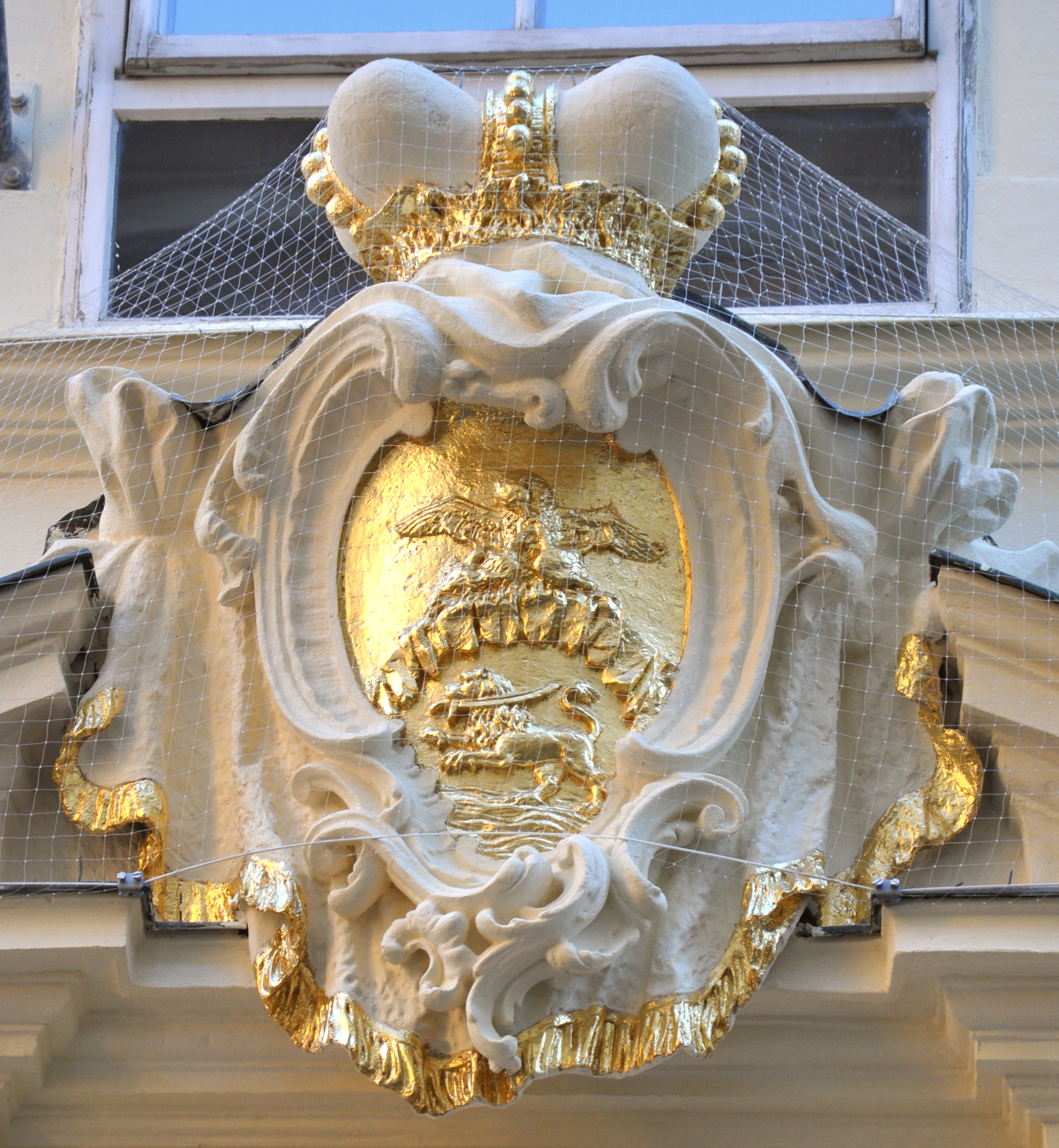
Coat of arms of the princes Batthyány in Vienna, Austria

The House of Batthyány (Hungarian: [ˈbɒcːaːɲi]) is an ancient and distinguished Hungarian noble magnate family. The Head of the family bears the title Prince (Fürst) of Batthyány-Strattmann, while other members of this family bear the title Count/Countess (Graf/Gräfin) Batthyány von Német-Ujvár respectively. A branch of the family (Croatian: Baćan) was notable in Bosnia and Croatia as well, producing several Bans (viceroys) of Jajce in the 15th and 16th century and later Bans of Croatia in the 16th, 17th and 18th century.

== History ==
The Batthyány family can trace its roots to the founding of Hungary in 896 CE by Árpád. The family derives from a chieftain called Örs. Árpád had seven chieftains, one by the name of Örs, which later became Kővágó-Örs. In 1398, Miklós Kővágó-Örs married Katalin Battyány. King Zsigmond (Sigismund) gave Miklós the region around the town of Battyán (now called Szabadbattyán) and he took the name Batthyány (lit. "from Battyán"). The family were first mentioned in documents in 1398 and have had their ancestral seat in Güssing in the Austrian region of Burgenland since 1522.

In 1570, Boldizsár Batthyány transformed the seat of the family, Güssing, into the center of Protestantism in the region. His descendant Ádám Batthyány (1610–1659), however, was Catholic and founded a Franciscan monastery in Güssing. On 3.1.1764 Count Karl Josef Batthyány was created Prince of the Holy Roman Empire. As he didn't have surviving sons, his princely title was inherited by his nephew Count Adam Wenzel (1722–1787). Count Lajos Batthyány became the first Prime Minister of Hungary during the Hungarian Revolution of 1848 and was executed in Pest in 1849. After 1945, the Batthyány family's property was largely expropriated in Hungary and other countries under Communist rule, although they retained their property in Austria.

== Modern era ==
Currently, the family has about 60 name bearers who live mainly in Austria, but also in Hungary, Germany, United States and Uruguay. The current head of the family is Prince Laszlo Edmund Christof Maximilian Eugen Anton von Batthyány-Strattmann, son of Prince Laszlo Pascal von Batthyány-Strattmann (1938–2015) and his wife Veronika Hauschka von Treuenfels (born 1942). Prince Laszlo lives with his wife and children in Austria.

== Princes Batthyány (later Batthyány-Strattmann) ==
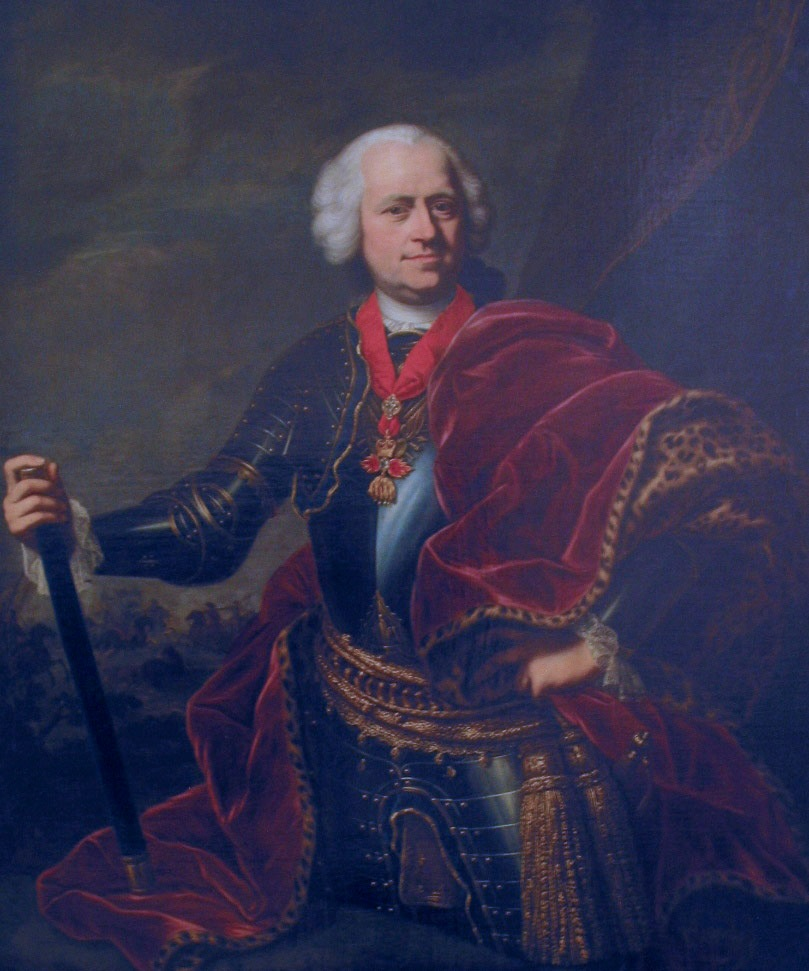
Károly József, 1st Prince Batthyány

- Károly József, 1st Prince Batthyány (1697–1772)
- Ádám Wenzel, 2nd Prince Batthyány-Strattmann (1722–1787)
- Lájos, 3rd Prince Batthyány-Strattmann (1753–1806)
- Fülöp, 4th Prince Batthyány-Strattmann (1781–1870)
- Gusztáv, 5th Prince Batthyány-Strattmann (1803–1883)
- Edmund Gustavus, 6th Prince Batthyany-Strattmann (1826–1914)
- László, 7th Prince Batthyany-Strattmann (1870–1931)
- László, 8th Prince Batthyany-Strattmann (1904–1966)
- László, 9th Prince Batthyany-Strattmann (1938–2015)
- László, 10th Prince Batthyany-Strattmann (born 1970)

== Notable members ==
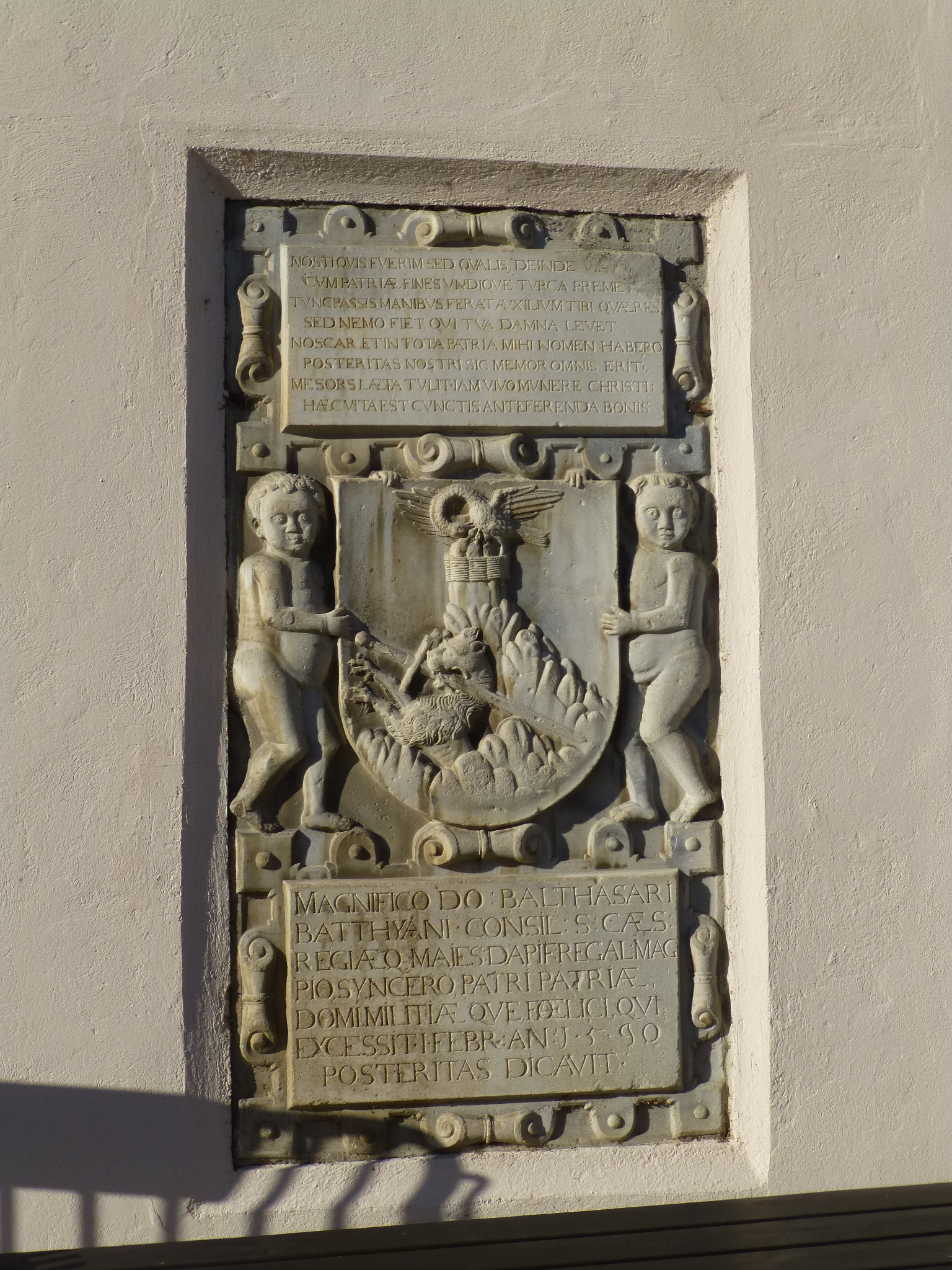
Boldizsár Batthyány, 1590, Güssing

- Boldizsár Batthyány (1543–1590), baron, well-educated humanist, became Protestant in 1570, protector of the botanist Carolus Clusius
- Ádám Batthyány (1610–1659), count, Founder of the Franciscan monastery in Güssing
- Adam II. Batthyány (1662–1703), Ban of Croatia
- Lajos Batthyány (1696–1765), Hungarian Court Chancellor and Palatine of Hungary.
- Károly József Batthyány (1697–1772), 1st Prince, Austrian field marshal and later educator of Joseph II, Ban (viceroy) of Croatia
- József Batthyány (1727–1799), bishop
- Ignác Batthyány (1741–1798), bishop and founder of the Batthyaneum Library, Alba Iulia, now Romania.
- Kázmér Batthyány (1807–1854), politician, minister in the Hungarian Revolution of 1848
- Franciska Batthyány (1802–1861), born Széchenyi
- Lajos Batthyány (1807–1849), executed, first Hungarian Prime Minister
- Count József Sándor Batthyány (1777–1812), his father
- Gusztáv, 5th Prince Batthyány-Strattmann (1803–1883), English sportsman, Thoroughbred racehorse owner/breeder
- Edmund Gustavus, 6th Prince Batthyany-Strattmann (1826–1914)
- Ludovika Olga Karoline Philippine Antonia Batthyany (1869–1939)
- Count Tivadar Batthyány (1859–1931)
- László, 7th Prince Batthyány-Strattmann (1870–1931), ophthalmologist, beatified in 2003
- Ervin Batthyány (1877–1945), anarchist and school reformer
- Countess Margit Batthyány (1911–1989) (de), lived until the end of World War II in Castle Rechnitz (Burgenland) where she was engaged in breeding horses and maintaining a reconvalescence home for members of the SS. Her involvement in the infamous Rechnitz massacre is still controversial.
- Sacha Battyhány, Swiss journalist and writer, author of the book "A Crime in the Family" about the participation of Comtesse Margit Battyhány and other members of the family in the Rechnitz massacre
- Karina Batthyány (born 1968), Uruguayan academic
- Carlos Batthyány (born 1969), Uruguayan physician, head of the Institut Pasteur Uruguay

=== Family tree ===
Batthyány family members
- Albert Batthyány de Németújvár (1397–1435) m. Klára Antimus (b. c. 1394)
  - András Batthyány (b. c. 1435) m. Veronika Imreffy de Szerdahely (b. c. 1458)
    - Boldizsár Batthyány (1452–1520) m. Ilona Hermanfi de Greben
      - Ferenc Batthyány (1497–1566) m. Katalin Bánffy de Alsólendva
      - Boldizsár Batthyány (d. 1528) m. Katalin Erhardi
        - Kristóf Batthyány (1500–1570) m. Erzsébet Svetkovics (d. 1571)
          - Boldizsár Batthyány (1543–1590) m. Dorottya Zrinski (1550–1617)
            - Ferenc Batthyány (1573–1625) Eva Poppel von Lobkowitz
              - Ádám Batthyány (1610–1659) m. Aurora Katharina von Formentini zu Talmein (1609–1653)
                - Kristóf "Christoph" II Batthyány (1632–1687) m. Maria-Anna Horváth de Palocsa
                  - Ádám II Batthyány m. 1692: Eleonore Strattmann (1673–1741)
                    - Lajos Batthyány (1696–1765) m. Therese Kinsky von Wchinitz und Tettau (1700–1775)
                      - Maria Antonia Batthyány (1720–1797) m. (1) Miklós Erdődy (1719–1757); m. (2) Károly József, 1st Prince Batthyány (1697–1772)
                      - Ádám Wenzel, 2nd Prince Batthyány-Strattmann (1722–1787) m. Mária Terézia Illésházy de Illésháza (1734–1807)
                        - Lájos, 3rd Prince Batthyány-Strattmann (1753–1806) m. (1) Franciska Seraphina Mária Janka Jozefa Francika de Paula Pálffy ab Erdõd (1753–1778); (2) Maria Elisabeth von Pergen (1755–1815)
                          - Fülöp, 4th Prince Batthyány-Strattmann (1781–1870)
                          - János Batthyány-Strattmann (1784–1865) m. Mária Terézia Esterházy de Galántha (1805–1859)
                            - Elizabeta Batthyány-Strattmann (1820–1882) m. Karlo Drašković of Trakošćan
                            - Leopoldine Batthyány-Strattmann (1824–1866), m. Alexander Ludwig Erdődy de Monyorókerék et Monoszló
                            - Juliana Franziska Batthyány-Strattmann (1827–1871), m. William Albert, 1st Prince of Montenuovo (1819–1895)
                      - József Batthyány (1727–1799)
                      - Tódor "Theodor" Batthyány (1729–1812) m. Philippine Esterházy de Galántha (1734–1811)
                        - Antal József Batthyány-Strattmann (1762–1828) m. (1) Mária Festetics de Tolna (1775–1800); (2) Mária Cäcilie von Rogendorff und Mollenburg (1775–1814)
                          - Gusztáv, 5th Prince Batthyány-Strattmann (1803–1883) m. 1828: Wilhelmine von Ahrenfeld
                            - Edmund Gustavus, 6th Prince Batthyany-Strattmann (1826–1914) m. 1857: Henrietta Mary Elisabeth Gumpel (d. 1893); (2) Amalie Holzmann
                            - Gustavus Batthyány (1828–1906)
                          - Kázmér Batthyány (1807–1854) m. Auguszta Keglevich de Buzin
                    - Károly József, 1st Prince Batthyány (1697–1772) m. (1) Maria Anna Barbara von Waldstein-Wartenberg (1693–1724); (2) Maria Theresa von Strattmann-Peuerbach (1708–1760); (3) Maria Antonia Batthyány (1720–1797)
                      - Eugen Franz Johann Joseph Batthyány (1722–1742)
                      - Maria Anna Walburga Batthyány (1735–1752)
                - Pál Batthyány (1639–1674) m. Katharina Illésházy de Illésháza (1641–1681)
                  - Zsigmund Batthyány (d. 1728) and Rosina Isabella von Gallenberg (1670–1731)
                    - Ádám III Batthyány (1704–1782) m. Terezia Esterházy de Galántha (1714–1757)
                      - Szidonia Regina Batthyány (1739–1816) m. János Illésházy de Illésháza (1736–1799)
                    - Emmerich Batthyány (1707–1774) m. (1) Maria Anna Victoria Walburga Josefa Eleonora Cyriaka Sauer von Krosiagh zu Ankerstein (1720–1764); (2) Eva Reichenhuber-Kautz
                      - József György Xaver Lajos János Ignac Batthyány (1737–1806) m. Mária Franciska Illésházy de Illésháza (1740–1817)
                        - József Antal Mária Vinczö Ferrerius Alajos Erhard Batthyány (1770–1851) m. (1) Anna Lázár de Szárhegy (1787–1831); (2) Antónia Tarnóczy de Alsólelócz et Jezernicze (1792–1876)
                          - József Batthyány (1836–1897) m. (1) Ludovika Batthyány (1843–1882), div. 1879; (2) Antonia Kornis de Gönczruszka (1835–1917)
                            - Agnes Batthyány (1862–1920) m. Johann Ägid Taxis-Bordogna-Valnigra (1856–1930)
                            - Antónia Johanna Ludovika Wilhelmine Batthyány (1864–1919) m. Frigyes Pongrácz de Szentmiklós et Óvár (1850–1932)
                            - Wilhelmine Antónia Ludovika Gabriela Batthyány (1867–1951) m. Aladár Bethlen de Bethlen (1854–1941)
                            - Ludovika Olga Károlina Philippina Antónia Batthyány (1869–1939) m. Tivadar Batthyány (1859–1931)
                            - László, 7th Prince Batthyany-Strattmann (1870–1931) m. 1898: Maria Theresia von Coreth zu Coredo und Starkenberg (1874–1951)
                              - László, 8th Prince Batthyany-Strattmann (1904–1966) m. Princess Antoinette zu Windisch-Graetz
                                - László, 9th Prince Batthyany-Strattmann (1938–2015) m. Veronika Hauschka von Treuenfels (b. 1942)
                                  - László, 10th Prince Batthyany-Strattmann (b. 1970)
                      - Ignác Batthyány (1741–1798)
                      - Johann Nepomuk Batthyány (1769–1826) m. Maria Anna von Gemmingen-Hornberg
                        - Károly Janos Nepomuk Batthyány (1799–1852) m. (1) Ernesztina Nádasdy de Nádasd et Fogarasföld (1801–1829); (2) Károlina Nádasdy de Nádasd et Fogarasföld (1810–1896)
                          - Zsigmond Károly Batthyány (1829–1906) m. Johanna Nepomucena Erdődy de Monyorókerék et Monoszló (1835–1915)
                            - Tivadar Batthyány (1859–1931) m. Ludovika Olga Károlina Philippina Antónia Batthyány (1869–1939)
                          - Ferenc Batthyány (1845–1877) m. Edit Trefort
                            - Ervin Batthyány (1877–1945) m. Alice Nuellens (1857–1933)
                        - Zsigmund Johann Batthyány (1810–1891) m. Mária Ágnes Franziska Katalin Theresia Batthyány (1815–1853)
                          - Béla Batthyány (1840–1895) m. Adelheid Tarnóczy-Tarnowsky
                          - Ludovika Batthyány (1843–1882) m. (div. 1879) József Batthyány (1836–1897)
                    - Zsigmund II Batthyány (1712–1777) m. Rosalia Anna Maria Christina von Lengheim (1707–1788)
                      - Miksa Batthyány (1739–1805) m. Magda Flaesser
                        - József Sándor Batthyány (1777–1812) m. Borbála Skerlecz de Lomnicza (1779–1834)
                          - Amalia Batthyány m. (1) 1824: Franz Oliver von Jenison-Walworth (div. 1831); (2) Count Karl Theodor von Westerholt-Gysenberg
                          - Lajos Batthyány (1807–1849) m. 1834: Antónia Zichy de Zics et Vázsonykő
                            - Amália Batthyány (1837–1922)
                            - Ilona Batthyány (1842–1929) m. Béla Keglevich von Buzin
                            - Elemér Batthyány (1847–1932)
                      - Fülöp "Philipp" Zsigmund Batthyány (1745–1795) m. (1) Maria Anna Elisabeth Katzianer von Katzenstein (1743–1791); (2) Maria Theresia Josepha von Stubenberg (1766–1813)
                        - József Emanuel Batthyány (1772–1851) m. Maria Anna von Ottenfels-Gschwind
                        - Kristóf Batthyány (1793–1878) m. Franziska von Gleispach (1794–1854)
                          - Mária Ágnes Franziska Katalin Theresia Batthyány (1815–1853) m. Zsigmund Johann Batthyány (1810–1891)
                          - Karoly Batthyány (b. 1817) m. Henriette Mária Erdődy de Monyorókerék et Monoszló (1838–1905)

== See also ==
- List of titled noble families in the Kingdom of Hungary
