= Lajos Batthyány (palatine) =

Hungarian noble, Court Chancellor and Palatine of Hungary

Count Lajos Batthyány de Németújvár
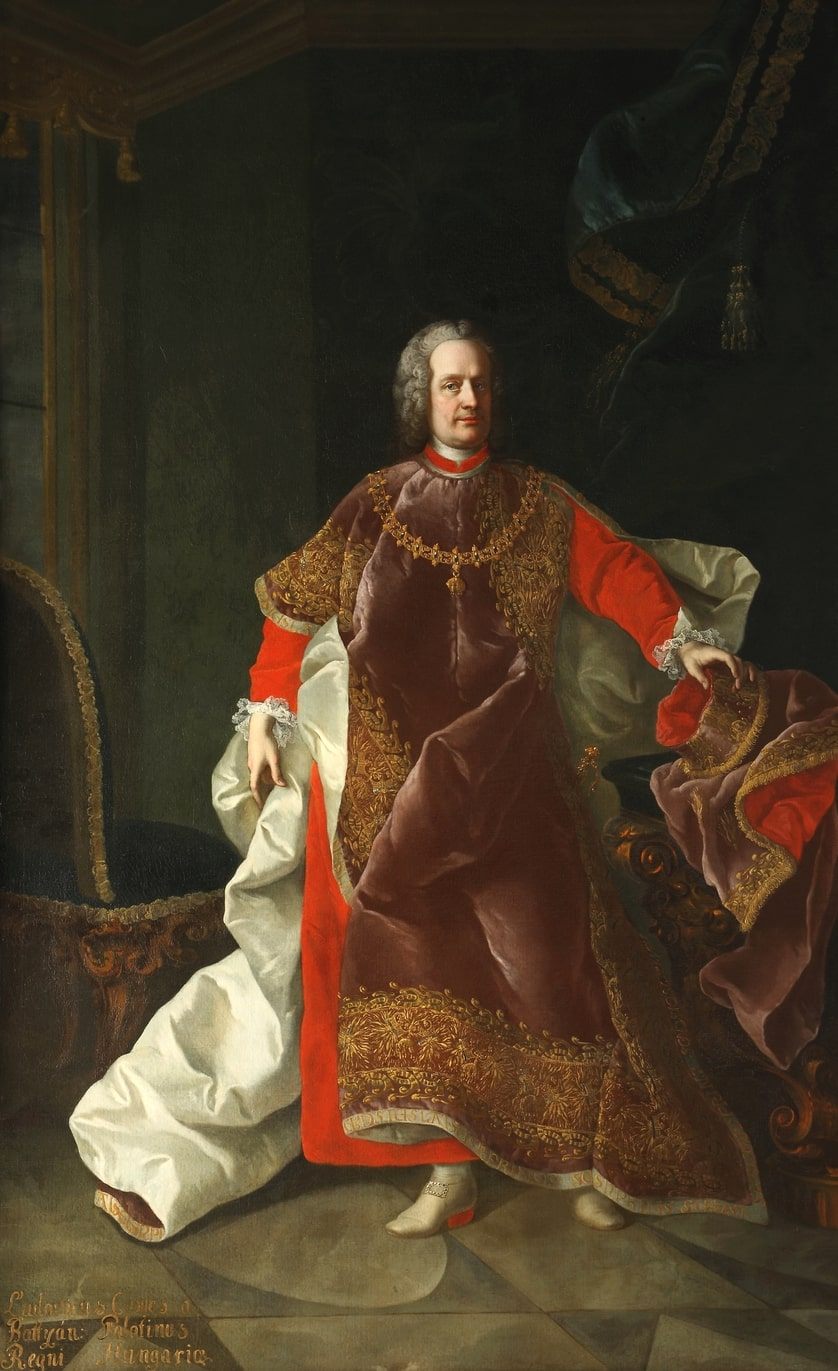
- Portrait by Martin van Meytens (1744)

101st Palatine of the Kingdom of Hungary
- In office: 4 May 1751 – 26 October 1765
- Predecessor: János V Pálffy
- Successor: Archduke Alexander Leopold
- Born: 17 March 1696 unknown, Kingdom of Hungary
- Died: 26 October 1765 (aged 69); Rechnitz, Archduchy of Austria, Holy Roman Empire
- Buried: Güssing Castle, Güssing
- Residence: Bicske Castle
- Noble family: Batthyány
- Spouse: Teréz Kinsky
- Issue: 4, including József
- Father: Adam II. Batthyány
- Mother: Eleonore von Strattmann

Lajos Ernő Batthyány (German: Ludwig Ernst Batthyány; 17 March 1696 - 26 October 1765) was a Hungarian noble, Court Chancellor and Palatine of Hungary.

== Early life ==
Lajos Batthyány was the eldest son of Adam II. Batthyány (1662–1703) and Eleonore Batthyány-Strattmann. Károly József Batthyány was his only brother. Like his father and brother, he first pursued a military career by joining the Habsburg Army.

== Career ==
Initially known as a captain, Batthyány fought in 1716 at the Battle of Peterwardein and at the Siege of Temesvár under the command of Prince Eugene. He then switched to the civil service. In 1737 he became the Hungarian Court Chancellor in Vienna. As such, he took part in the Diet in Pressburg in 1741 and supported Empress Maria Theresa in a memorable speech. He was Chief Cupbearer (Obermundschenk), privy councilor and from 1744 a Knight of the Golden Fleece (No 712). In 1751 he became the last Palatine of Hungary until his death. In 1756 he raised a regiment of hussars that fought in the Seven Years' War. He chose Bicske Castle as his administrative and head office and extensively remodeled it.

In his final years, he fell out of favour on the question of the treatment of the serfs by the Hungarian nobility. Frequent peasant riots and complaints of forced labour and harsh treatment on Batthyány's domains decided Maria Theresa to investigate the matter herself. The sovereign named Lajos Batthyány as one of “the most hardened oppressors”. The investigation led to a number of reforms aimed at improving peasant conditions in Hungary most notably the land registry patent of 1767.

== Personal life ==
On 27 May 1717 he married in Vienna Countess Therese Kinsky von Wchinitz und Tettau (1700–1775), daughter of Wenceslaus Norbert, Count of Kinsky. Together, they had five sons and four daughters, including:

- Countess Maria Antonia Batthyány (1720–1797), who married her paternal uncle Károly József Batthyány, whom Empress Maria Theresa elevated to the rank of Imperial Prince in 1764.
- Ádám Wenzel, 2nd Prince Batthyány-Strattmann (1722–1787), who married Countess Mária Terézia Illésházy de Illésháza.
- Count József Batthyány (1727–1799), a Cardinal and Prince-primate of Hungary.
- Count Tódor "Theodor" Batthyány (1729–1812), an industrial; he married Countess Philippine Esterházy de Galántha, a daughter of Count Ferenc Esterházy.
- Count Fülöp "Philipp" Batthyány (1734–1795), who also joined the military.

Lajos Batthyány died in 1765 and was buried in the family crypt of Güssing Castle.

== Sources ==
- Biography (in German)
- Güssing Castle Crypt
