= Strattmann =

Strattmann is a surname. Notable people with the surname include:

- Theodor von Strattman (1637–1696), an Austrian statesman
- Countess Eleonore Batthyány-Strattmann (1672–1741), a Viennese Court lady
- Prince Batthyány-Strattmann (1803–1883), a Hungarian landowner and race-horse owner in England
- Prince Edmund Batthyany-Strattmann, (1826–1914), a Hungarian landowner and yachtsman
- The Blessed László Batthyány-Strattmann (1870–1931), a Hungarian doctor and layman beatified by the church in 2003.
