= Palais Batthyány =

Palace complex in Vienna

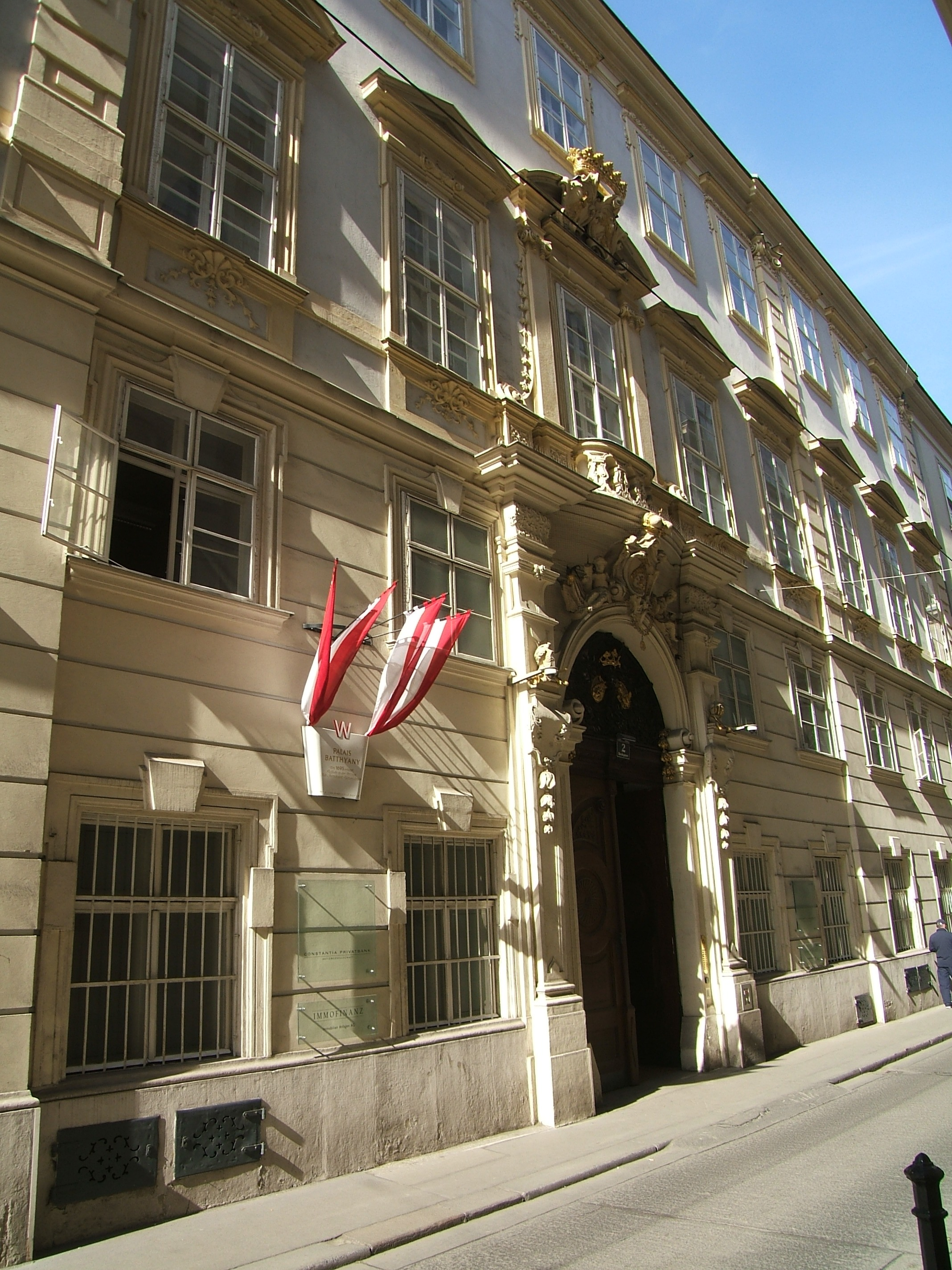
The Batthyány-Strattmann Palace in Herrengasse

The Palais Batthyány (also: Palais Batthyány-Strattmann or Batthyány Palace) is a palace in the 1st district of Vienna, Innere Stadt, at the corner of Herrengasse 19 and Bankgasse 2.

== History ==
The large complex was created in 1716 by combining the Orsini-Rosenberg Palace, located at Herrengasse 19, with two houses on Bankgasse. In 1718, Eleonore Batthyány-Strattmann acquired the palace. She commissioned the architect Christian Alexander Oedtl, who remodeled the central building and provided the ensemble with a unified façade.

In the second half of the 19th century, the Hotel Klomser was located at Herrengasse 19, which became famous due to the suicide of the Austro-Hungarian military Colonel Alfred Redl, who was convicted of espionage for Russia. In 1911, it briefly returned to the Batthyány family and was sold to the Lower Austrian Fire Insurance Company in 1924. The state rooms were destroyed during the adaptation work. In 1988, the palace came into the possession of Constantia Privatbank AG. The daily newspaper Der Standard occupied the part of the building that was formerly the Orsini-Rosenberg Palace with its editorial offices until 2012. After a general renovation, the palace now houses rental apartments, with commercial space on the ground floor.

== Gallery ==
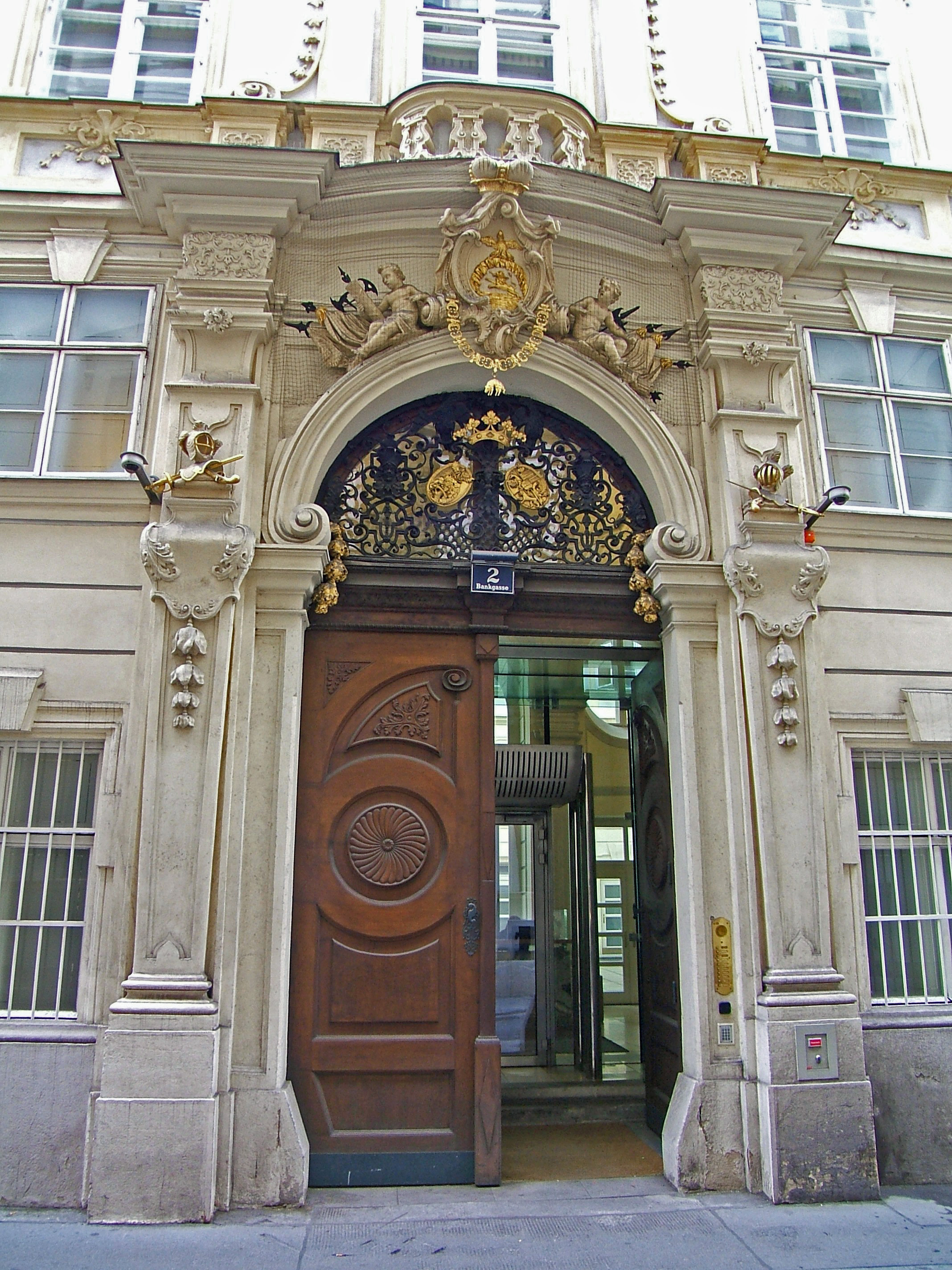
Entrance

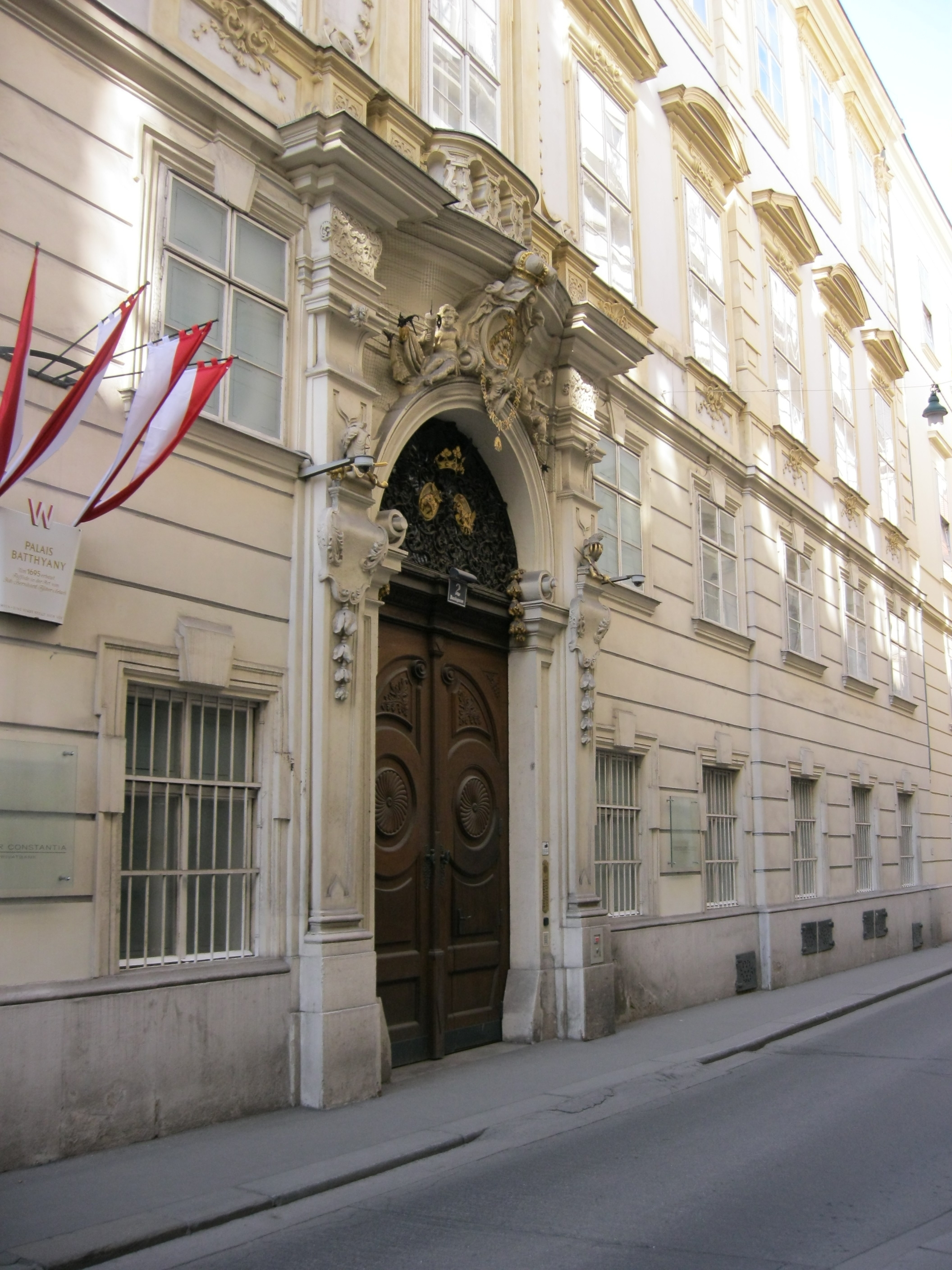
View of entrance from the street

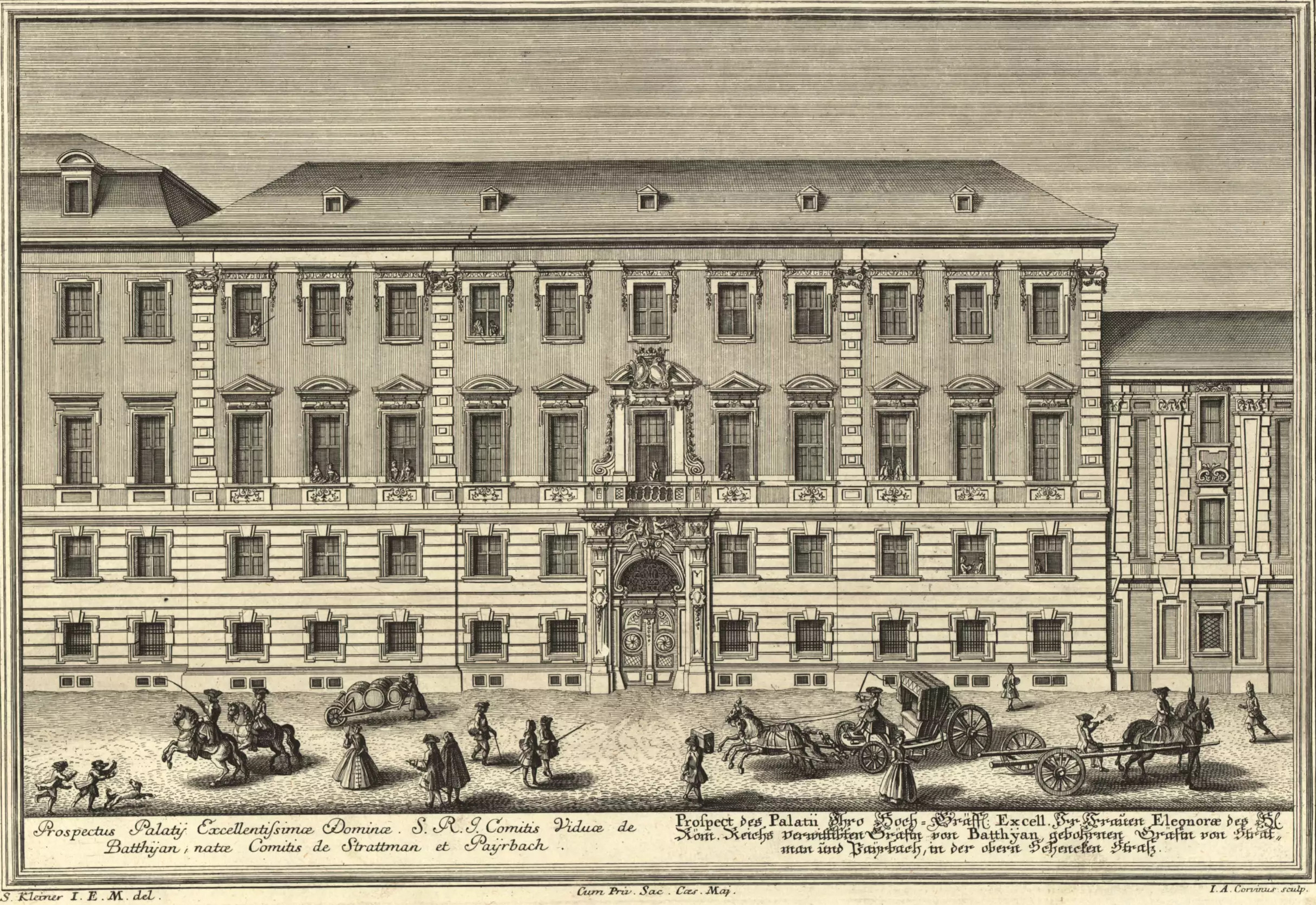
The Palace, around 1733
