= Latin American Council of Social Sciences =

International non-governmental institution

CLACSO
- Latin American Council of Social Sciences
- Consejo Latinoamericano de Ciencias Sociales
- Founded: 1967
- Founded at: Estados Unidos 1168, Buenos Aires, Argentina
- Type: international NGO
- Region served: Latin America Caribbean
- Fields: Social sciences
- Members: Radical Open Access Collectives
- Secretary General: Karina Batthyány
- Affiliations: Progressive International
- Website: https://www.clacso.org/ *https://biblioteca.clacso.edu.ar/

The Latin American Council of Social Sciences (CLACSO) is an national non-governmental institution, created in 1967 from an initiative of UNESCO, an institution in which it has Associative status. Currently, it brings together 680 research centers and postgraduate programs (masters and doctorates) in various fields of the social sciences and humanities, located in 51 countries in Latin America and the Caribbean, as well as in the United States, Africa and Europe. Its headquarters are in Buenos Aires, Argentina. The current executive secretary of the organization is Karina Batthyány (period 2019-2021).

The objectives of the Council are the promotion and development of research and teaching of social science; the strengthening of exchange and cooperation between institutions and researchers from within and outside the region; and the adequate dissemination of the knowledge produced by social scientists among social forces and movements and civil society organizations. Through these activities CLACSO contributes to rethinking, from a critical and plural perspective, the integral problems of Latin American and Caribbean societies.

== General Assembly ==
The highest governing body is the General Assembly that takes place every three years. Its main powers are to choose the Executive Secretary and the members of the Steering Committee; decide on the reports, financial statements and the income and expenses budget; decide on the affiliation and / or disaffiliation of Member Centers proposed by the Steering Committee; and provide guidance on the contents of the proposed work program for the immediate period.

== Working Areas ==
The Executive Secretariat is divided into the following Areas, Programs and Sectors:

Academic Area

- Regional Scholarship Program
- Working Groups Program
- CLACSO Network of Postgraduate Social Sciences

International Relations Area

- Poverty Studies Program in Latin America and the Caribbean CLACSO-CROP
- Collaboration Program with Asia and Africa SOUTH-SOUTH

Information and Documentation Area

- CLACSO Virtual Libraries Network

Editorial Production and Web Content Area

- Social Observatory of Latin America
- CLACSO Electronic Academic Network Sector
- Administrative Sector

== CLACSO Virtual Libraries Network ==
In order to give visibility and facilitate access to the results of the research of the CLACSO Member Centers, as of 1998, an institutional repository was developed that currently offers free and open access to:

- CLACSO Digital Repository or Reading Room with full texts of books, non-refereed magazines, lectures and working documents published by the CLACSO network
- Portal of refereed journals (with peer review) of the CLACSO network is a joint service CLACSO – Redalyc.
- Multimedia portal that includes links to audiovisual productions, online radios, audio files and photographic collections of the CLACSO network

The service is a joint effort of:

- CLACSO digital repository coordinating team
- Coordinating team of the CLACSO collection in Redalyc
- Editors and Libraries Community
- Community for the exchange of experiences Social Sciences Multimedia

CLACSO, in collaboration with more than 309 member centers in 21 countries of Latin America and the Caribbean, participate in the promotion of open access to the results of research financed with public funds. The CLACSO Campaign to Support Open Access to Academic and Scientific Knowledge reflects activities carried out by CLACSO and its member centers throughout the region.

One of the main forms of open access are digital repositories / libraries and digital journal portals that disseminate the production of each institution and allow the organization of digital collections, the possibility of advanced search in the contents, and the opportunity to share collections with other repositories.
