= Aaron ben Isaac of Rechnitz =

Aaron ben Isaac of Rechnitz (Hebrew: אהרון בן יצחק שור מרכניץ; c. 1695 - 1790) was a minor 18th-century German-Jewish rabbinic commentator.

== Biography ==
Aaron was born in Frankfurt an der Oder, Germany around 1695. His father Isaac Itzik Jekels was a rabbi in Frankfurt an der Oder, and a paternal grandson of Aaron Jekel of Frankfurt. In his later life, Aaron moved to Rechnitz, Austria and established himself as a learned scholar. In Sulzbach, he authored a midrashic commentary on the Bible, which was published in 1786 under the title "Bet Aharon" (lit. House of Aaron). This title may have been an homage to his great grandfather's work of the same name. In was in Sulzbach that Aaron died in 1790. He had two children, David Rechnitz (b. 1720) who a rabbi in Sulzbach, and Chana Rechnitz, (b. 1715) who was the maternal grandmother of Abraham Naftali Hertz Scheuer.
