= Karina Batthyány =

Uruguayan sociologist, scholar and writer

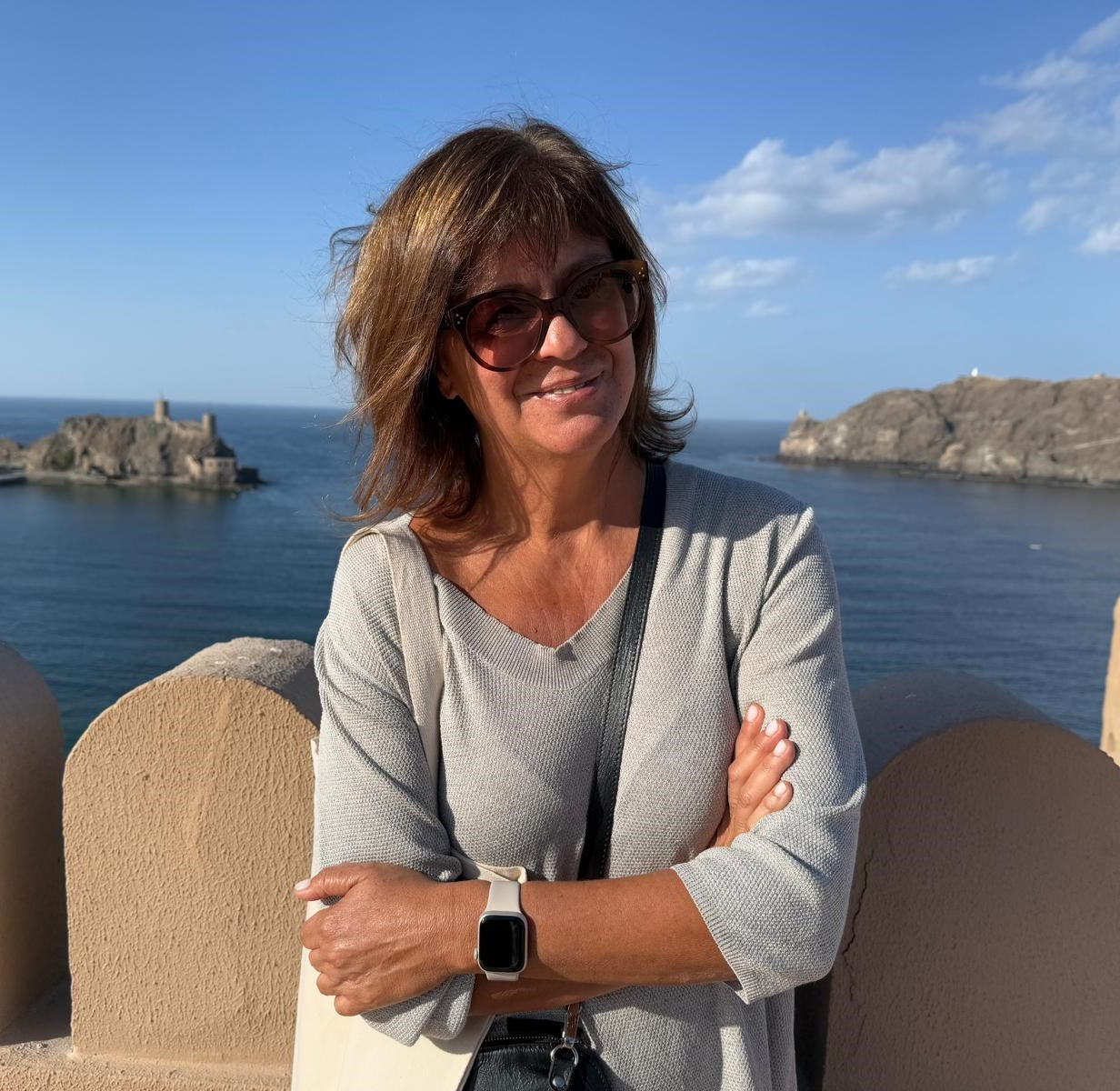
- Born: Karina Batthyány Dighiero; August 18, 1968; Montevideo, Uruguay
- Education: University of the Republic; Catholic University of Uruguay; University of Versailles Saint-Quentin-en-Yvelines
- Occupations: sociologist, scholar, author

Karina Batthyány (born 18 August 1968 in Montevideo) is a Uruguayan sociologist, scholar and author. Her main areas are social welfare, care and gender.

== Biography ==
Graduated from the Faculty of Sociology, University of the Republic, she subsequently completed a master's degree at the Catholic University of Uruguay. She did research in the fields of gender studies, regional development and urban sociology. In 2003 she obtained a PhD in sociology at the University of Versailles Saint-Quentin-en-Yvelines. Batthyány stresses the importance of making women's thinking visible in the field of Social Sciences and all work areas. She advocates for a culture of gender equality, promoting it in everyday life and in the workplace.

Since 1992, Batthyány has been a professor at the Faculty of Sociology. In 2019, she was appointed executive secretary of the Latin American Council of Social Sciences (CLACSO). Further, she is a consultant of several international organizations: ECLAC, UN Women, ILO, EuroSocial.

In May 2025, Batthyány was a candidate for rector of the University of the Republic.
