= Adam II. Batthyány =

Hungarian general

Count Adam II. Batthyány
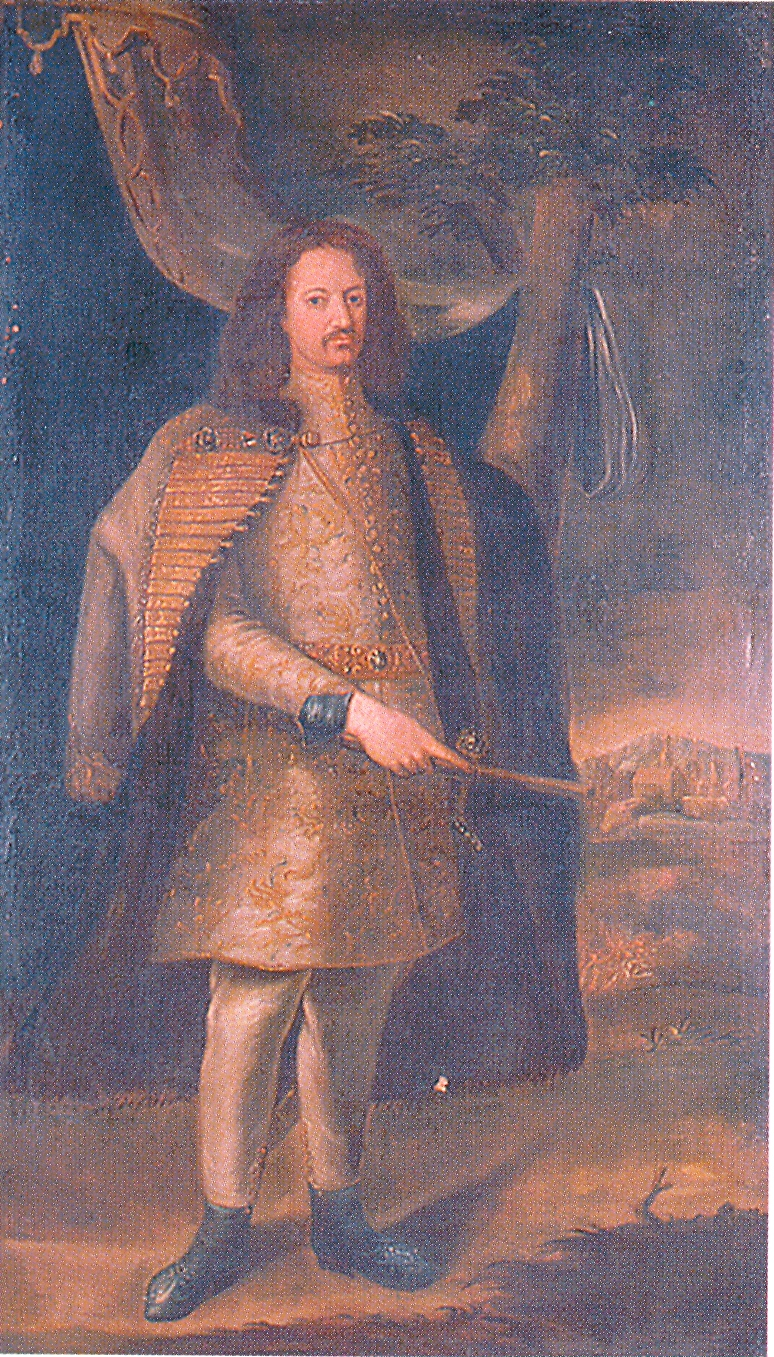
- Born: 3 June 1662; Vienna
- Died: 26 August 1703 (aged 41); Vienna
- Spouse: Eleonore Batthyány-Strattmann
- Children: Ludwig Ernst Batthyány; Karl Josef Batthyány
- Military career
- Allegiance: Holy Roman Empire
- Conflicts: Great Turkish War

Count Adam II. Batthyány (Croatian: Adam Baćan, 3 June 1662 – 26 August 1703) was a Hungarian general and nobleman. He served as ban (viceroy) of Croatia from 1693 to 1703.

== Career ==
Adam II. Batthyány was born in 1637, the son of Christoph II Batthyány and his wife Maria-Anna Horváth de Palocsa. He came from Németújvár in the frontier region of Austria and the Kingdom of Hungary. The Batthyány Family were Hungarian aristocrats loyal to the Habsburg dynasty who served in the Habsburg military conflicts against the Ottoman Empire. He and his father, a general, took part in the Turkish Wars.

In October 1683 he took part in the conquest of the fortress of Gran (Esztergom) with his hussars. During the siege of Buda, where he fought alongside a young Prince Eugene, Adam II and his 1200 hussars captured 12 galleys part of the Ottoman Fleet with enormous treasures. In recognition of his deeds, he was appointed the owner of a regiment and general and commander-in-chief of the border areas around Kaniza.

In 1693 he became the Ban of Croatia, Dalmatia and Slavonia. For his outstanding and valuable military service to Emperor Leopold I, Batthyány was rewarded with the Bóly Estate in the year 1700. He died at the age of 41 on 26 August 1703.

== Family ==
Adam II married Countess Eleonore Strattmann (1677–1741), the daughter of Imperial Court Chancellor Count Theodor Heinrich von Strattmann, on 25 November 1692. After father-in-law Theodor's death in 1693, the Strattmann estates were combined with those of the Batthyány family.

Adam and Eleonore had two children:

1. Ludwig Ernst Batthyány (1696–1765), Hungarian Court Chancellor and Palatine of Hungary. Married to Theresia Countess Kinsky von Wchinitz and Tettau.
2. Karl Josef Batthyány (1697–1772), Field marshal, Ban of Croatia and Chief Chamberlain. He took part in the campaign against the Ottoman Empire under Prince Eugene. Empress Maria Theresa elevated him to the rank of prince (imperial title) on 3 January 1764. Married to Maria Anna Barbara von Waldstein, then to Maria Theresa Countess von Strattmann, and finally to Maria Antonia Nemetujvari Countess Batthyány.

== Sources ==
- "History of the Batthyánys". Batthyány-Strattmann (in German). 2020-03-16.
- "Biographisches Lexikon zur Geschichte Südosteuropas". Biographisches Lexikon zur Geschichte Südosteuropas (in German).
- "Biographisches Lexikon zur Geschichte Südosteuropas". Biographisches Lexikon zur Geschichte Südosteuropas (in German).
- Basics, B.; Móricz, P. (2007). The Batthyány House, the Memory of Count Batthyány Lajos. Vas Megyei Múzeumok Igazgatósága. ISBN 978-963-9827-01-1.
- Families of Hungary with coats of arms and national orders

Preceded by Miklós Erdődy	Ban of Croatia; 1693–1703	Succeeded by János Pálffy
