= Schloss Rechnitz =

Former castle in Burgenland, Austria

Coordinates: 47°18′17″N 16°26′31″E

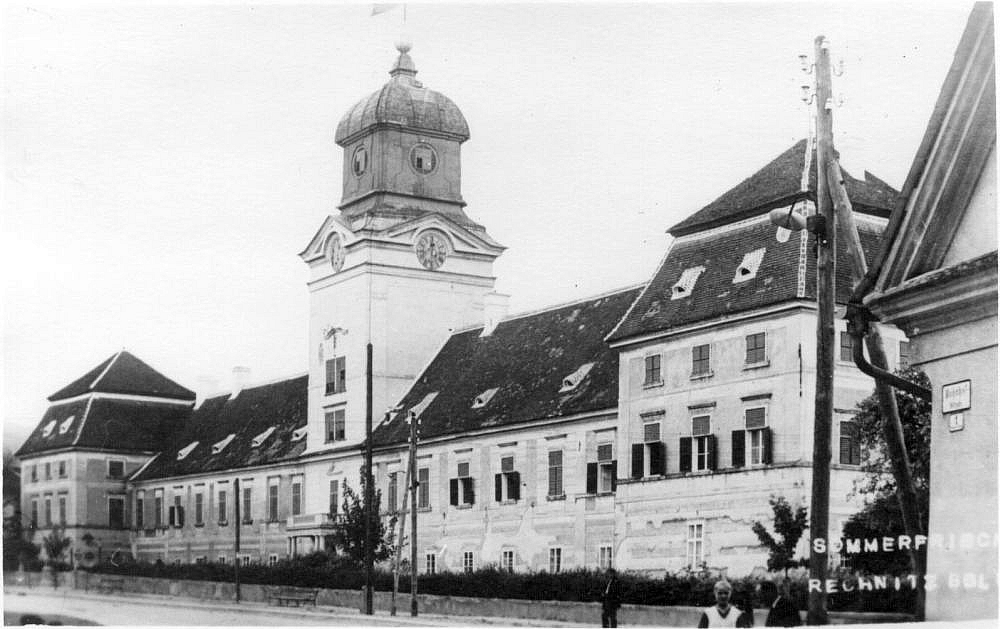
Schloss Rechnitz around 1930

Schloss Rechnitz (Hungarian: Rohonc, Rohoncz) also known as Schloss Batthyány, was a castle located in the center of Rechnitz in the Oberwart district of Burgenland, Austria. It belonged to the Batthyány family for several centuries. It was largely destroyed during World War II in 1945. Today, only a few remnants of the castle remain.

== History ==
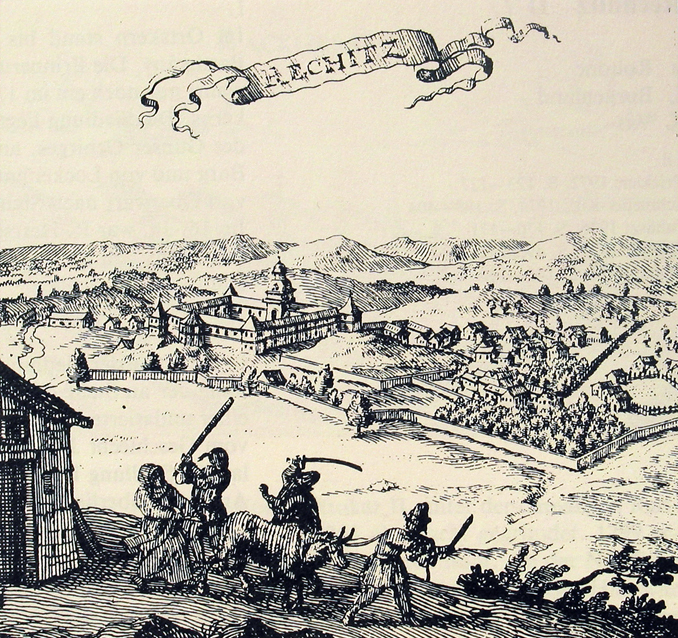
Castle Rechnitz in 17th century, copperplate engraving by Burckhard von Birkenstein 1689

Its establishment dates back to the 13th century. In 1527, the Bohemian-Hungarian king and later Emperor Ferdinand I granted Rechnitz firstly as a pledge to Ferenc Batthyány, and eventually as an allod in 1564.

In 1687, Adam II Batthyány (1662–1703) granted a protection letter to the 36 Jews residing in Rechnitz; a similar agreement had already been made by his father, Christoph, in 1673. This laid the foundation for the formation of a small Jewish community.

In 1906, Schloss Rechnitz was acquired by Heinrich Baron Thyssen-Bornemisza de Kászon, the youngest son of August Thyssen, who had obtained the Hungarian noble title through adoption.

During World War II, the SS requisitioned the castle. In the final months of the war, it served as the headquarters of the construction section of the South-east Wall. Forced laborers were also housed in the castle's stables and cellar. On the evening of 24 March 1945, the Rechnitz massacre took place nearby, carried out by participants of a Gefolgschaftsfest held in the castle against Jewish-Hungarian forced laborers. Margit von Batthyány, Heinrich Thyssen's daughter, who had married Count Ivan von Batthyány in 1933, was the last owner of the castle.

Schloss Rechnitz was presumably heavily damaged by the Red Army during the night of 29-30 March 1945. Later, it was dismantled.

== Architecture ==
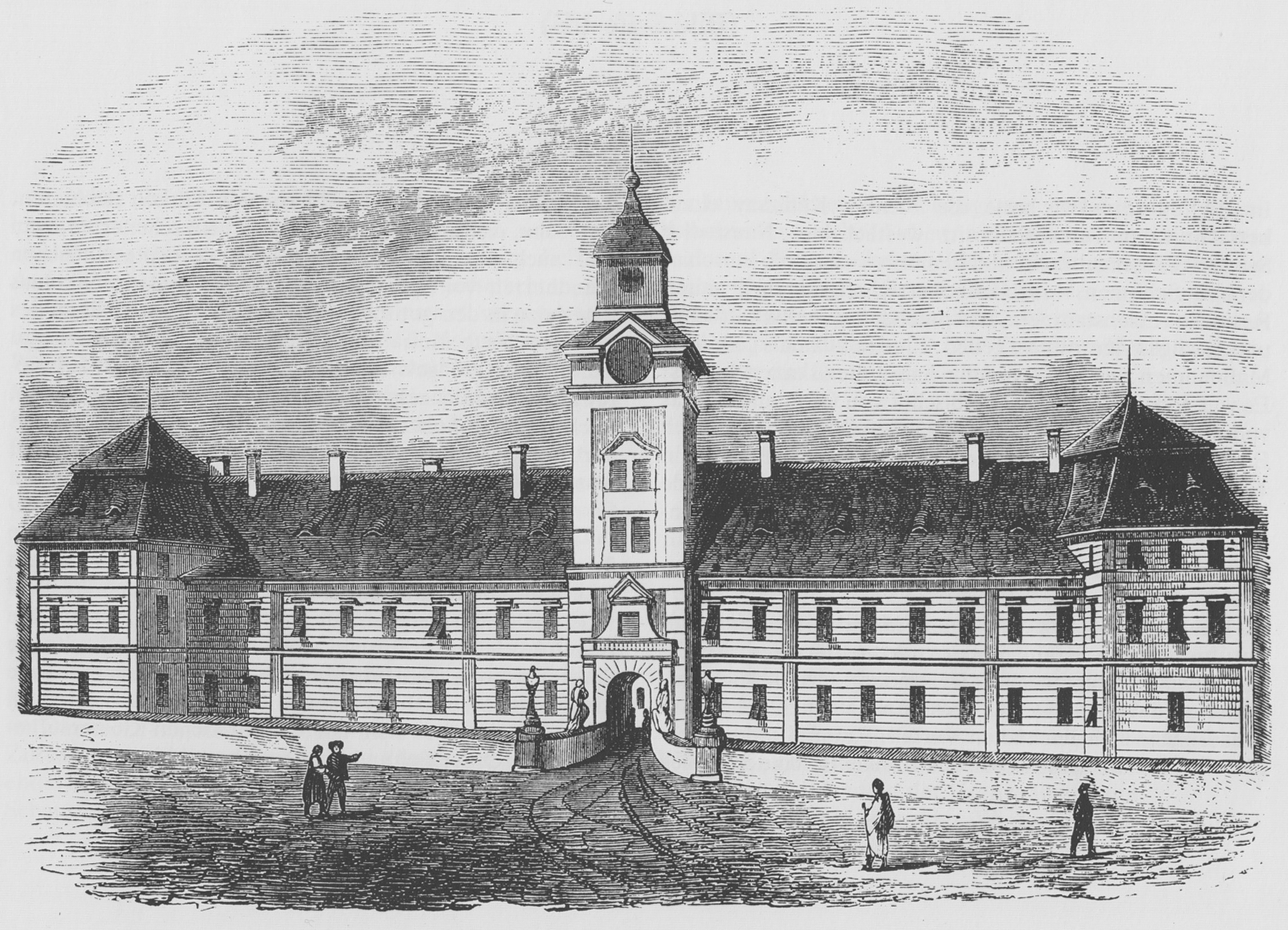
Schloss Rechnitz, around 1859

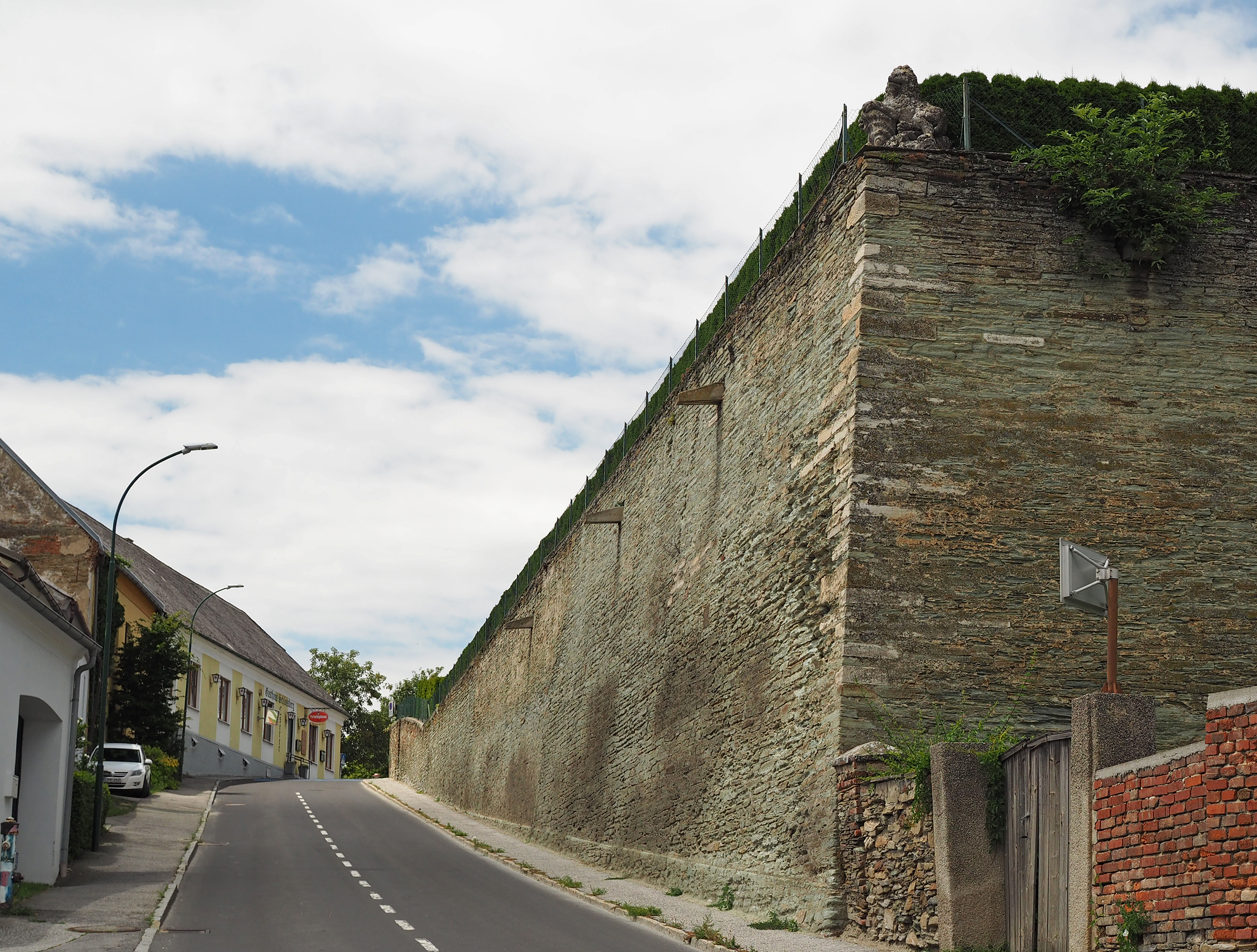
The retaining wall of Schloss Rechnitz

The former castle was a very large complex. It had a trapezoidal floor plan surrounding an arcaded courtyard. It was so large that a whole Hussar regiment could drill in it. In the center of the courtyard stood a fountain adorned with a pelican, the coat of arms of the Batthyány family. The complex had four corner towers. The long, two-story front facade was dominated by a tall gate tower, which was later converted into a neoclassical clock tower. Powerful three-axial pavilions projected bastion-like at the corners of the main facade. The castle had more than 200 rooms. Several rooms on the first floor of the south and east wings were adorned with beautiful stucco ceilings and ceiling paintings. The interior furnishings dated from the last quarter of the 17th century. The chapel was located in the middle of the rear wing, with its walls articulated by Ionic pilasters. The stucco work was considered the work of Filiberto Lucchese.

North of a street called Schlossberggasse, the towering retaining wall of the former castle can still be seen. Furthermore, extensive cellar structures and a well, adorned with a former stone lantern, have survived. New buildings have been erected on the site of the castle.

== See also ==
- List of castles in Austria

== Literature ==
- Die Kunstdenkmäler Österreichs. Dehio Burgenland 1976. Rechnitz, Schloss, S. 249, und Schlossberggasse, S. 251.
