= Eleonore Batthyány-Strattmann =

Austrian courtier (1673–1741)

- Countess Batthyány-Strattmann
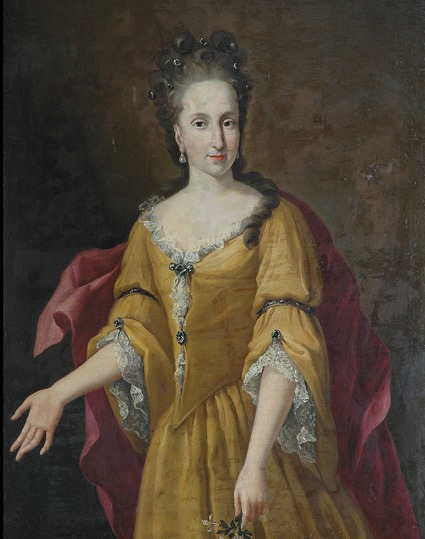
- Portrait of Eleonore Batthyány-Strattmann by an unknown artist
- Known for: Close association with Prince Eugene of Savoy
- Born: Eleonore Magdalena Ursula von Strattmann und Peuerbach; 29 May 1673; Palatinate, Holy Roman Empire
- Died: 24 November 1741 (aged 68); Vienna, Archduchy of Austria, Holy Roman Empire
- Residence: Schloss Rechnitz, Batthyány-Strattmann Palace
- Noble family: Strattmann (by birth); Batthyány (by marriage)
- Spouse: Adam II. Batthyány (m. 1692; d. 1703)
- Issue: Ludwig Ernst Batthyány; Karl Josef Batthyány
- Father: Theodor von Strattman
- Mother: Marie Mechtilde Freiin von Mollard
- Occupation: Courtier, estate manager

Countess Eleonore Batthyány-Strattmann (29 May 1673 – 24 November 1741) was an Austrian courtier and noblewoman who played a prominent role in Habsburg court society. As the daughter of Theodor Heinrich von Strattmann und Peuerbach, the Imperial Court Chancellor under Emperor Leopold I, she was well-connected in Viennese aristocratic circles. Through her marriage to Adam II. Batthyány, a Hungarian noble and Ban of Croatia, she became responsible for managing the extensive Batthyány estates after his death in 1703.

A politically astute figure, Eleonore was closely associated with Prince Eugene of Savoy, one of the most influential military leaders of the time. She hosted gatherings of high-ranking officials and diplomats, and her influence at court was widely acknowledged. Her role as an estate manager and courtier positioned her as a key intermediary between Hungarian and Austrian interests within the Habsburg Empire.

== Early life and family ==
Countess Eleonore Magdalena Ursula von Strattmann und Peuerbach was born on 29 May 1673 in the Palatinate, the daughter of Imperial Court Chancellor Count Theodor Heinrich von Strattmann und Peuerbach and his first wife, Marie Mechtilde von Mollard (d. 1684).

The Strattmann family, of German noble origin, hailed from the Duchy of Cleve, where Eleonore's father was in the service of the Electorate of Brandenburg. In 1683, the family relocated to Vienna, where Count Theodor von Strattmann played a key role in arranging the third marriage of Emperor Leopold I to Eleonore Magdalene of Neuburg. In 1685, Emperor Leopold I elevated Theodor von Strattmann to the rank of count and appointed him Austrian court chancellor, a role that functionally made him the empire's chief diplomat. Eleonore had five brothers and two sisters.

== Marriage and inheritance ==
On 25 November 1692, Eleonore married Count Adam II. Batthyány (1662–1703). The Batthyány family, like many Hungarian aristocrats, was loyal to the Habsburg dynasty and played a key role in the empire's military campaigns against the Ottoman Empire. Ádám II Batthyány, originally from Németújvár, distinguished himself through military service under Emperor Leopold I, most notably at the Siege of Stuhlweissenberg and the Siege of Buda (1686), where he fought alongside the young Prince Eugene of Savoy. In recognition of his service, he was appointed Ban of Croatia in 1693 and was granted the Bóly estate in 1700.

Following Ádám's early death on 26 August 1703, Eleonore assumed responsibility for the extensive Batthyány estates and the guardianship of their two sons, Ludwig Ernst (b. 1696) and Karl Josef (b. 1697).

== Viennese society ==
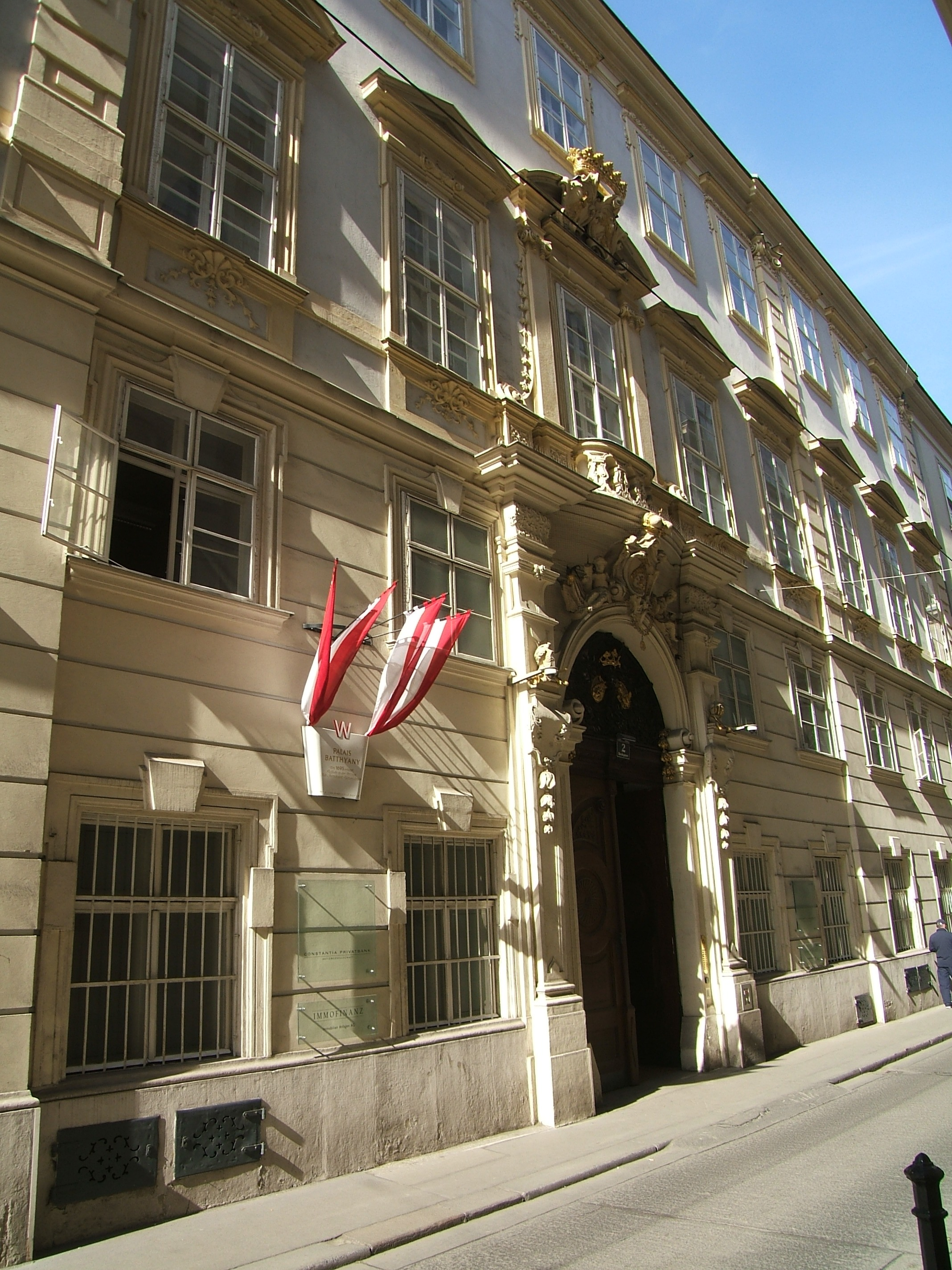
The Batthyány-Strattmann Palace in Vienna, residence of the Countess

Her Vienna residence, the Strattmann Palace, was designed by the renowned Baroque architect Johann Bernhard Fischer von Erlach. After her father's death, the palace was merged into the Batthyány family holdings. Eleonore primarily resided at Rechnitz Castle, then in Hungary. She sold another Batthyány property in Vienna, the palace at Renngasse 4, to the Bishop of Bamberg. In 1718, she acquired the former Palais Orsini-Rosenberg, today known as the Batthyány-Strattmann Palace, near Prince Eugene's Winter Palace in Vienna.

A prominent figure in Viennese court society, Eleonore was widely respected and known as Die schöne Lori ("The Beautiful Lori"). Contemporary accounts describe her as intelligent, self-assured, and politically astute. Her brother, Heinrich Strattmann (1662–1707), left behind a widow, Eleonore (1677–1738), daughter of Imperial Field Marshal Schellart von Obbendorf. This "Grande Dame" hosted soirées and assemblies in her palace on Schenkenstraße (now Bankgasse) in Vienna, attended by Vienna's political and intellectual elite.

== Association with Prince Eugene ==
Eleonore Batthyány-Strattmann never remarried but became the closest confidante of Prince Eugene of Savoy, with some contemporaries speculating about a romantic involvement. For the last two decades of his life, Prince Eugene was a frequent guest at Schloss Rechnitz and Eleonore's Vienna residence, which was near his Winter Palace. They met almost daily until his death in 1736. Their acquaintance dated back to the 1680s, when Eleonore's father, the Imperial chancellor, and Eugene both arrived in Vienna around the same time. The precise beginning of their relationship remains uncertain, but Eugene's acquisition of a Hungarian estate after the Battle of Zenta, near Eleonore's Rechnitz Castle, placed them in close proximity.

Maria Theresa reportedly referred to Eleonore's children as "Eugene's codicils". Some Viennese circles speculated that he was their father. Following the War of the Spanish Succession, Eleonore was frequently mentioned in diplomatic correspondence as "Eugene's Egeria", his "soulmate", and "the lady of his heart". When asked whether she and Eugene would marry, she reportedly responded: "I love him too well for that; I would rather have a bad reputation than deprive him of his."

Eleonore's influence over Eugene was noted by contemporaries, with some crediting her for persuading him to spare Hungary from political upheaval following the Peace of Passarowitz. The Duke of Richelieu also referenced her role in Eugene's inner circle in his memoirs. On 21 April 1736, Eugene spent his final evening playing cards with Eleonore before dying. She lived the remainder of her life quietly in Vienna and died on 24 November 1741.

== Issue ==
Ádám II and Eleonore had two children: Ludwig (Lajos) and Karl Josef (Károly József)

1. Ludwig Ernst Batthyány (1696–1765), Hungarian Court Chancellor and Palatine of Hungary. Married to Theresia Countess Kinsky von Wchinitz and Tettau.
2. Karl Josef Batthyány (1697–1772), Field marshal, Ban of Croatia and Chief Chamberlain. He took part in the campaign against the Ottoman Empire under Prince Eugene. Empress Maria Theresa elevated him to the rank of prince (imperial title) on 3 January 1764. Married to Maria Anna Barbara von Waldstein, then to Maria Theresa Countess von Strattmann, and finally to Maria Antonia Nemetujvari Countess Batthyány.

In 1755, 14 years after her death, her sons Ludwig Ernst and Carl Joseph obtained the imperial concession to pass on the hyphenated double surname (Doppelname) Batthyány-Strattmann to their descendants, in consideration of their mother's dominant role in their inheritance.
