= József Batthyány =

Hungarian nobleman, Cardinal and patron of the arts

His Eminence József Batthyány
- Archbishop of Esztergom; Primate of Hungary
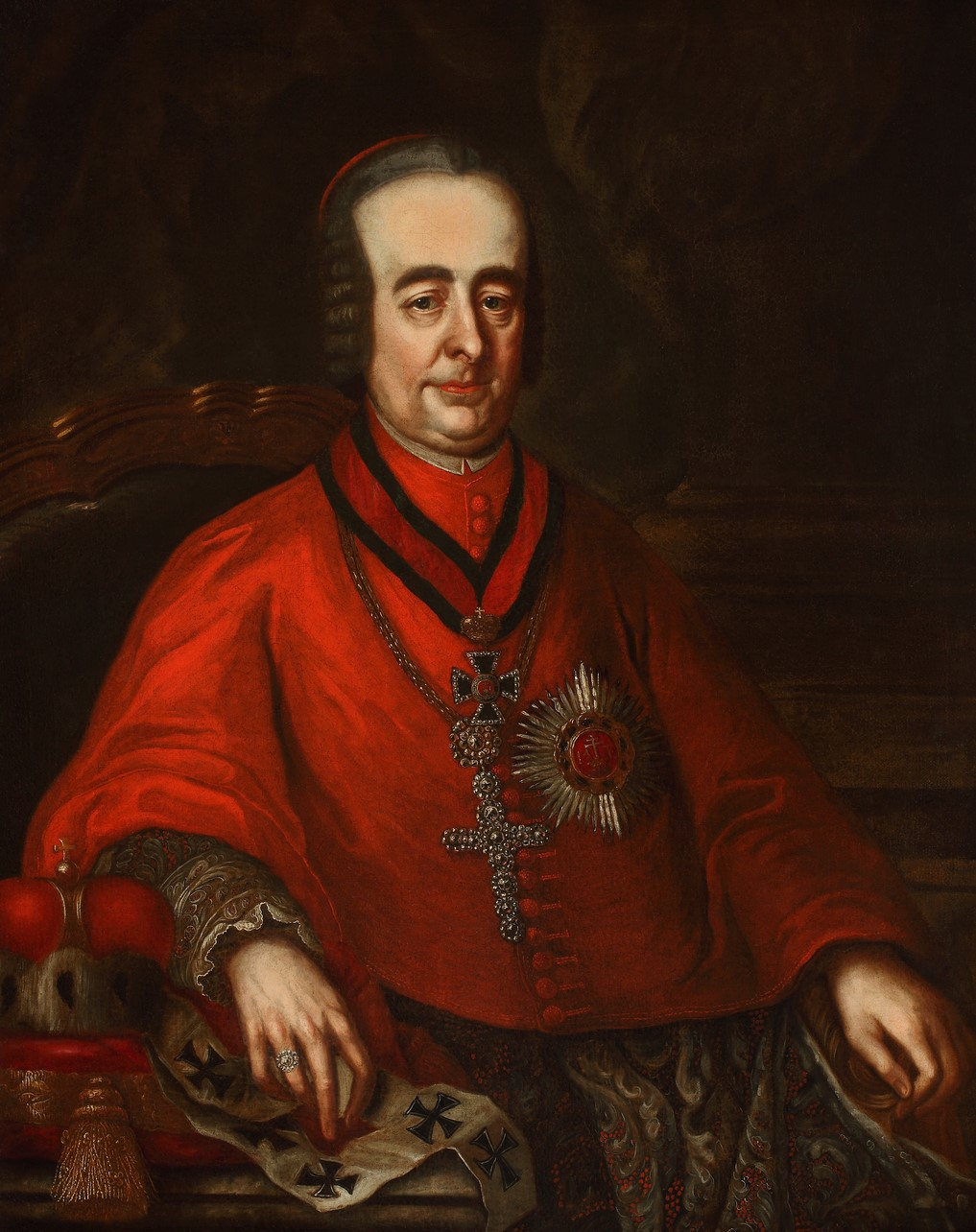
- Portrait by Johann Michael Militz, c. 1780
- Church: Catholic Church
- Archdiocese: Esztergom
- Appointed: 20 May 1776
- Term ended: 23 Oct 1799
- Predecessor: Ferenc Barkóczy
- Successor: Karl Ambrosius of Austria
- Other posts: Cardinal-Priest of San Bartolomeo all'Isola (1782-1799)
- Previous posts: Bishop of Alba Iulia (1759-1760); Archbishop of Kalocsa–Kecskemé (1760-1776)

Orders
- Ordination: 29 June 1751
- Consecration: 2 December 1759
- Created cardinal: 1 June 1778 by Pope Pius VI
- Rank: Cardinal-Priest

Personal details
- Born: 30 January 1727 Vienna, Austria
- Died: 23 October 1799 (aged 72) Bratislava
- Buried: St Martin's Cathedral
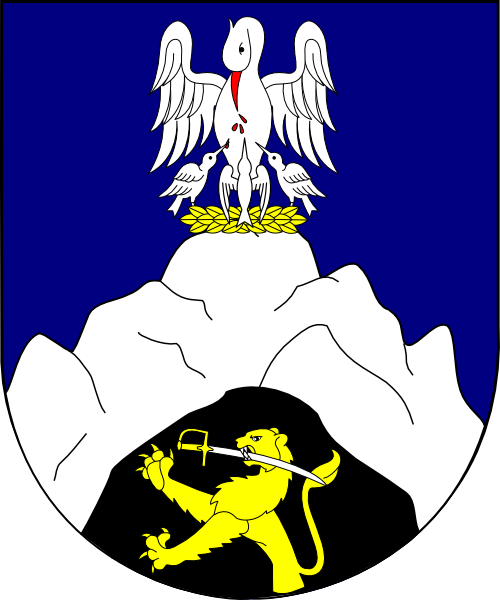
- Coat of arms

Josef Batthyány (Hungarian: Batthyány József, Vienna, 30 January 1727 - Pressburg, 23 October 1799), was a Hungarian nobleman, Cardinal and patron of the arts from the Batthyány family.

He was Archbishop of Esztergom, Cardinal and Prince Primate of Hungary, and as such crowned both Leopold II and his son and successor Francis II as King of Hungary. The cardinal was one of Maria Theresa's personal advisors and was considered a mediator and reconciler within the Kingdom of Hungary.

== Biography ==
He was born in one of the oldest and most influential Hungarian noble families, as second son of Lajos Batthyány, Palatine of Hungary. He attended the gymnasium in Kőszeg and studied theology in Trnava. He was ordained a priest on 29 June 1751. He became a canon of Esztergom in 1752, and provost of Pressburg in 1755.

On 13 July 1759, he was elected Bishop of Transylvania and consecrated on 2 December of the same year. He had not yet settled into his episcopal see, when on 15 December 1760, he was promoted to Archbishop of Kalocsa-Bács.
On 20 May 1776, he was transferred to the Archdiocese of Esztergom and elevated to the dignity of Primate of Hungary.

Pope Pius VI made him a Cardinal in the consistory of 1 June 1778 and on 19 April 1782 in a consistory held in the Imperial Palace in Vienna, he conferred on him the title of San Bartolomeo all'Isola.

In his role as Primate of Hungary he crowned Leopold II as King of Hungary in 1790 in Pressburg and Francis II in 1792 in Buda. At the first threat of a French invasion (1797) he was a very active mediator.

He had the Primate's Palace in Pressburg (Bratislava) built between 1778 and 1781, where he resided as Archbishop until his death, and spent 400,000 florins on it.

He died in Pressburg (now Bratislava) on 23 October 1799 at the age of 72. He was buried in St. Martin's Cathedral.

Catholic Church titles
Preceded by Zsigmond Antal Sztojka	Bishop of Transylvania; 1759–1760	Succeeded by József Anton Bajtay
Preceded by František Xaver Klobušický	Archbishop of Kalocsa-Bács; 1760–1766	Succeeded by Adam Patačić
Preceded by Ferenc Barkóczy	Archbishop of Esztergom; Primate of Hungary; 1776–1799	Succeeded by Karl Ambrosius of Austria-Este
Preceded by Juan Álvaro Cienfuegos Villazón	Cardinal-Priest of San Bartolomeo all'Isola; 1782–1799	Succeeded by Pietro Francesco Galleffi
