= Rechnitz =

- Municipality
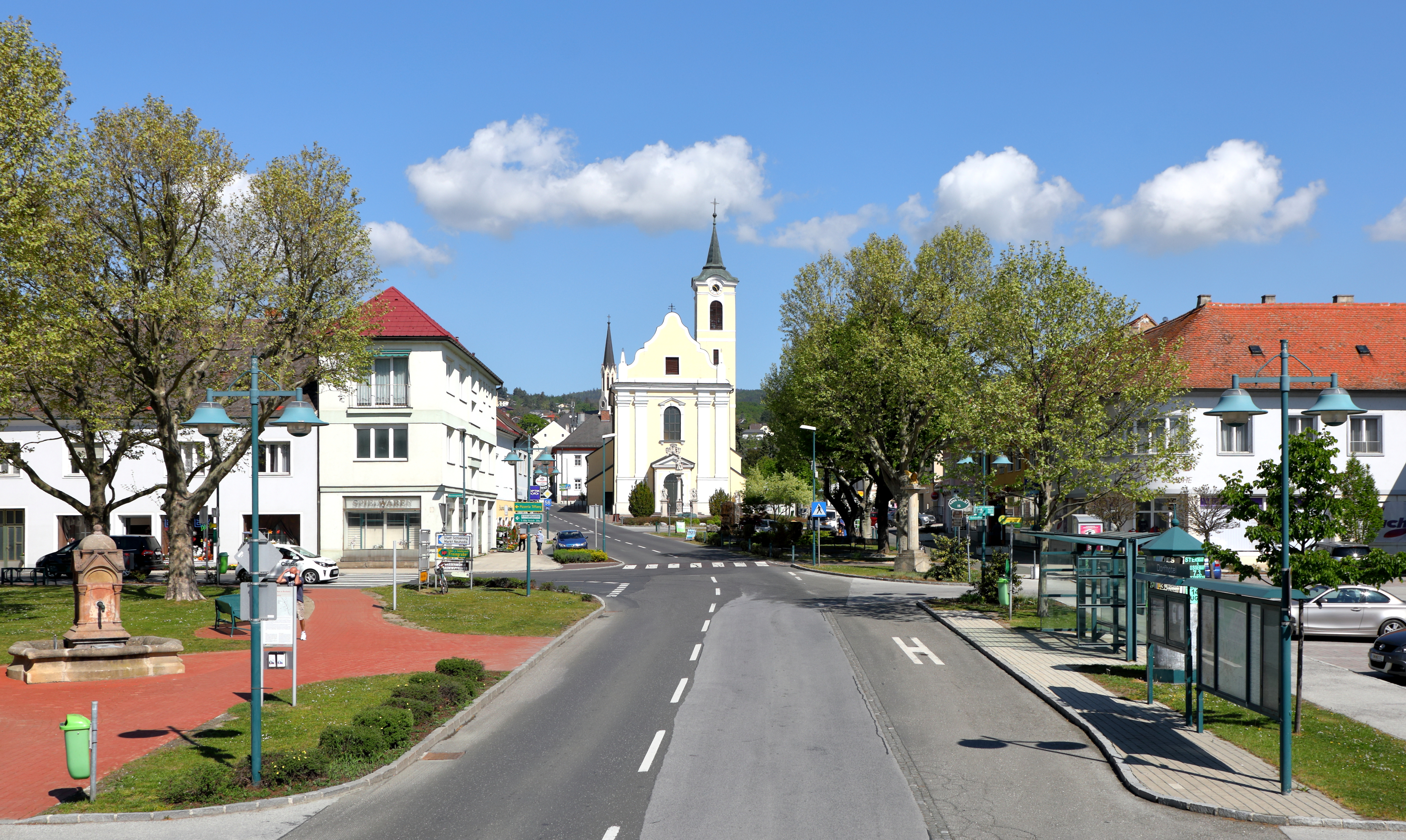
- Main square of Rechnitz

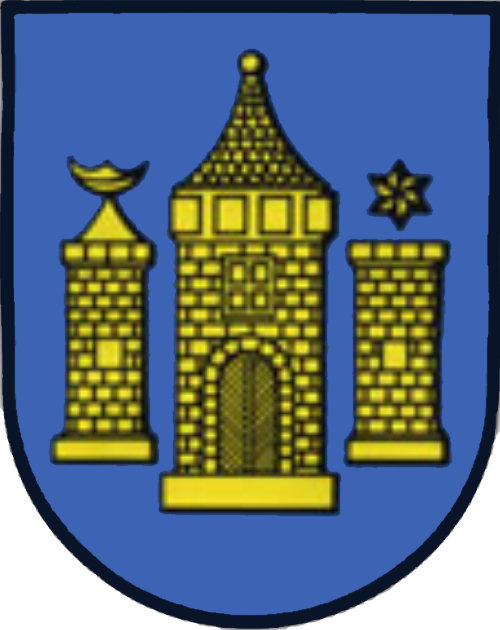
- Coat of arms

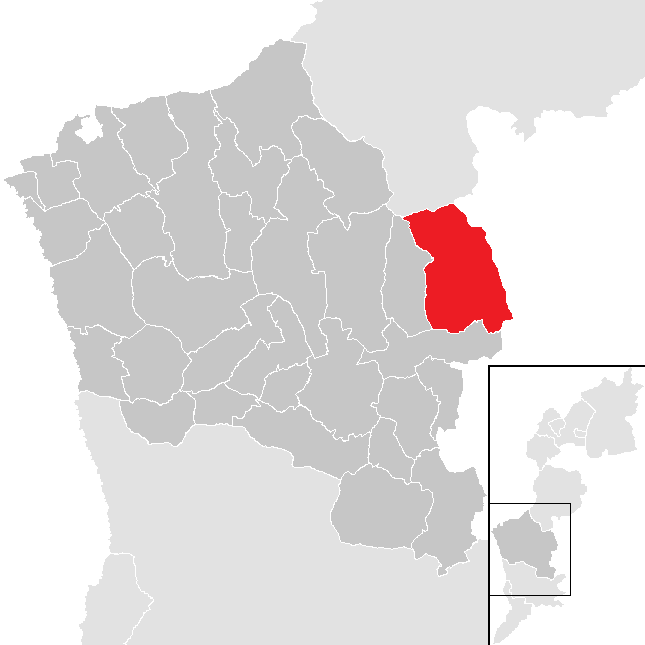
- Location within Oberwart district

- Location within Austria
- Coordinates: 47°18′25″N 16°26′18″E
- Country: Austria
- State: Burgenland
- District: Oberwart

Government
  - Mayor: Martin Kramelhofer (SPÖ)

Area
  - Total: 43.77 km^{2} (16.90 sq mi)
- Elevation: 366 m (1,201 ft)

Population (2018-01-01)
  - Total: 3,054
  - Density: 69.77/km^{2} (180.7/sq mi)
- Time zone: UTC+1 (CET)
  - Summer (DST): UTC+2 (CEST)
- Postal code: 7471
- Vehicle registration: OW
- Website: www.rechnitz.com

Rechnitz (Croatian: Rohunac, Hungarian: Rohonc, Rohoncz, Romani: Rochonca) is a municipality in Burgenland in the Oberwart district in Austria.

== Geography ==
The municipality is located in southern Burgenland, on the border with Hungary, near Bozsok and Szombathely. The highest mountain in Burgenland, the Geschriebenstein, and the most eastern foothills of the Alps are partially located within the municipality.

== History ==
Until 1920/21, the village was a part of Hungary, as was the entire state of Burgenland. Ever since 1898 the Hungarian name Rohonc had to be used, due to the policies of the Budapest government. In 1919, after the end of World War I, Burgenland was awarded to Austria through the treaties of St. Germain and Trianon. Since 1921, the village has been a part of the Austrian state of Burgenland.

== Rechnitz Massacre ==
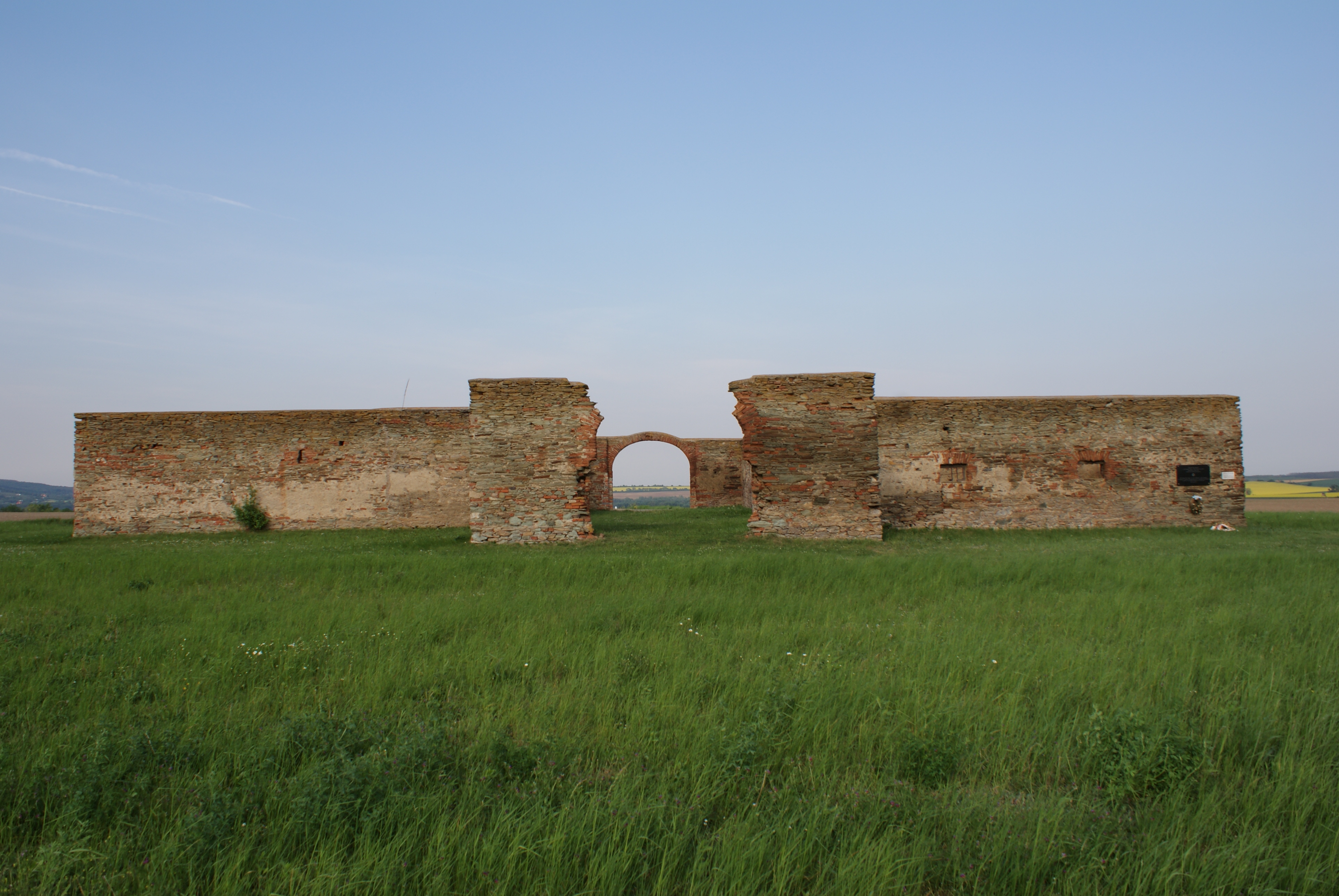
Kreuzstadl

Near the end of World War II, some 200 Hungarian Jews were murdered near Rechnitz. In 2007, British journalist David Litchfield published an essay in the Frankfurter Allgemeine Zeitung alleging that the murders were carried out by a group of locals who had gathered for a party at the castle of the Countess of Batthyany, born Margit Thyssen-Bornemisza. Litchfield wrote that the party and the killing were organized by Nazi commander Hans Joachim Oldenburg, her lover, and that at some point during the evening of 24–25 March 1945, guns were handed out to party guests and 200 Jewish forced laborers who were being housed at the manor were hunted down and killed as entertainment. Afterwards the guests returned to the castle to continue the party.

A number of notable historians have disputed Litchfield's version of the massacre, among them anti-Semitism researcher Wolfgang Benz and Winfried Garscha of the Documentation Centre of Austrian Resistance. Garscha states that the Nazis had already made plans to murder the 200 Jewish prisoners, who were considered too weak and sick to march on ahead of the rapidly-advancing Soviet army, before the Countess's party, and that the killings were in fact carried out by Nazi soldiers under orders from their superiors and not by civilian party guests: "It was indisputably a mass murder but it didn't arise from a party whim. People incapable of marching were murdered everywhere at the time."

Sources differ as to the evidence. Some say that at the end of the 1960s, some of the bodies of the victims were found by accident – 18 corpses were exhumed and moved to a Jewish cemetery in Graz. Then the trail died for another 30 years, finally revived by a documentary film Stecken, Stab und Stangl, by Erne/Heinrich, the essay by Litchfield, and the play Rechnitz (der Würgeengel) by Elfriede Jelinek. As of October 2007, the bodies of the remaining victims have still not been found. The incident was followed five days later by the nearby Deutsch Schützen massacre.

== Population ==
Historical population
Year	Pop.	±%
1869	3,969	—
1880	3,899	−1.8%
1890	3,913	+0.4%
1900	4,051	+3.5%
1910	4,137	+2.1%
1923	3,772	−8.8%
1934	3,799	+0.7%
1939	3,501	−7.8%
1951	3,387	−3.3%
1961	3,374	−0.4%
1971	3,418	+1.3%
1981	3,399	−0.6%
1991	3,462	+1.9%
2001	3,237	−6.5%
2011	3,098	−4.3%

== Politics ==
The mayor of Rechnitz is Engelbert Kenyeri of the Social Democratic Party of Austria; the deputy mayor is Alois Karacsony of the Austrian People's Party. Reinhard Tangl is the chief officer.

The distribution of seats (23 in all) in the municipal council is as follows: Social Democratic Party of Austria 13, Austrian People's Party 8, and Freedom Party of Austria 2.

== Rohonc Codex ==
A historical codex written in an unknown script and language was held in Rechnitz until 1838, when it was donated to the Hungarian Academy of Sciences by Gusztáv Batthyány, a Hungarian count, together with his entire library.

=== Sister Cities ===
Rechnitz has been a twin city of the German city of Alzey since 1981.

== Personalities ==
- Karl Josef Batthyány
- Aaron ben Isaac of Rechnitz, rabbi
- Gustav Pick, composer

== See also ==
- Schloss Rechnitz
