= Theodor von Strattman =

Austrian diplomat (1637 – 1693)

Count Theodor von Strattman
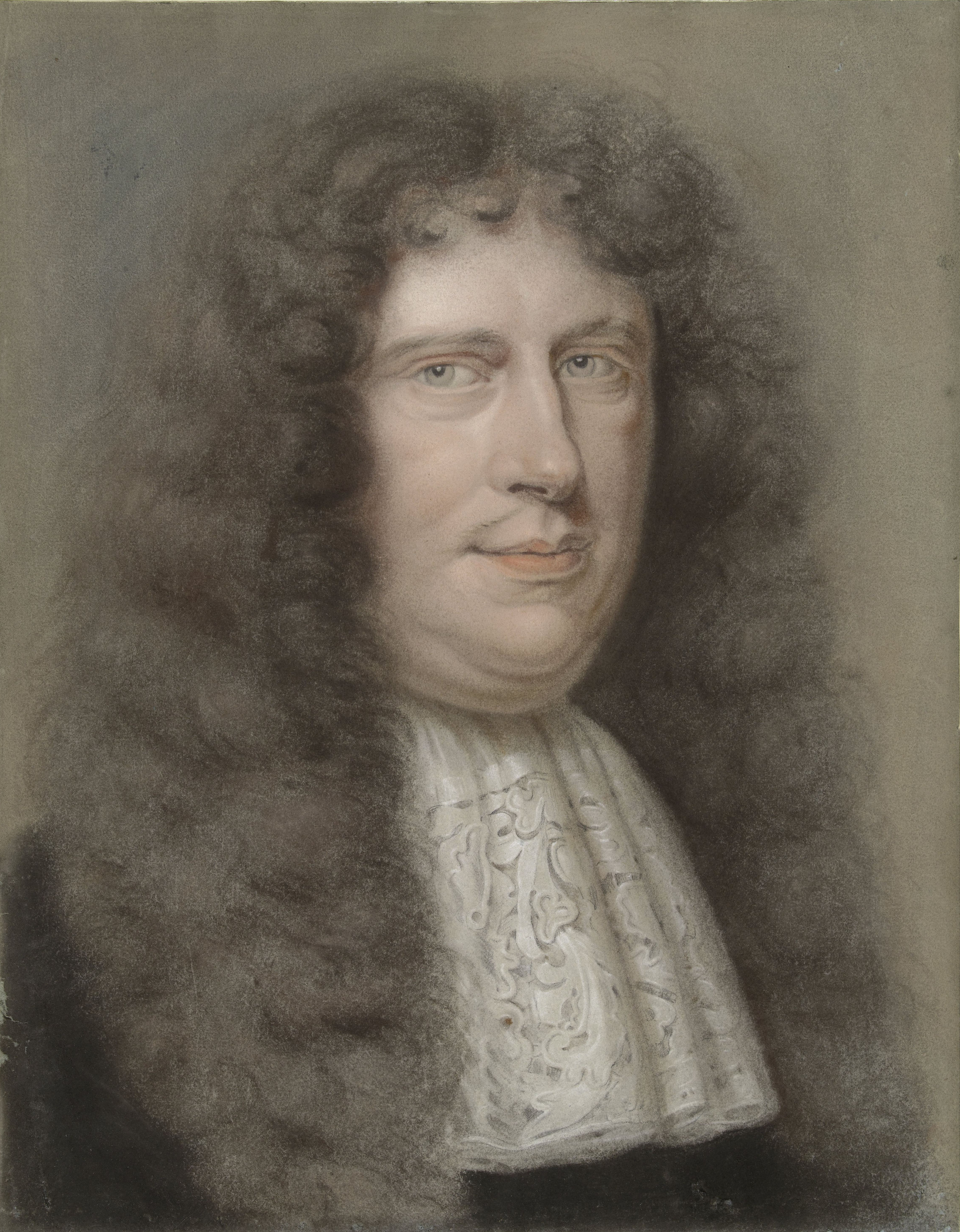
- Portrait of Count Theodor Heinrich von Strattmann

Personal details
- Born: 1637
- Died: 25 October 1693 (aged 55–56)

Theodor Heinrich von Strattmann (1637 – 25 October 1693) was an Austrian statesman. He came from a distinguished historical family.

== Career ==
Initially he served the Elector of Brandenburg, and later was at the court of the Elector Wilhelm von der Pfalz-Neuburg, (Palatinate) where he held the position of vice chancellor (Vicekanzler). There he distinguished himself in dealing with disputes between Brandenburg and the Palatinate.

Wishing to advance his career beyond the confines of the court at Düsseldorf he entered the service of the Imperial Court where he came to the attention of Leopold I (1658 – 1705). He was sent as a representative to the peace negotiations at Nijmegen in 1676. Following this he worked to bring about the third marriage of the Emperor to Eleonor Magdalene of Neuburg in 1676. He enjoyed the favours of his new Empress. From 1680–1683 he was the Austrian ambassador at Regensburg, and on 1 March 1683 became Hofkanzler following the death of his predecessor (Johann Paul Freiherr von Hocher 1663–1683), until his death in 1693. In that role he arranged the marriage of Leopold's daughter Maria Antonia of Austria to Maximilian II Emanuel, Elector of Bavaria in 1685, and settled the dispute between Lorraine and Hungary. On 30 September 1685 he was raised to the nobility as Count. He worked on the Habsburg succession culminating in the coronation of Joseph I In 1690 as King of the Romans.

== Life ==
Strattmann was married twice, first to Marie Mechtilde Freiin von Mollard, and secondly to Eleonore Therese, Countess Schellard. With his first wife he had five sons and three daughters. His daughter Eleonore Batthyány-Strattmann (1677–1741) was famous for her liaison with Prince Eugene of Savoy.
