= Batthyány-Strattmann =

Batthyány-Strattmann can refer to

- Countess Eleonore Batthyány-Strattmann (1672–1741), a Viennese Court lady
- Gusztáv Batthyány, later Gusztáv, 5th Prince Batthyány-Strattmann (1803–1883), a noble Hungarian landowner and race-horse owner in England
- Prince Edmund Batthyany-Strattmann, 6th Prince Batthyany-Strattmann (1826–1914), a noble Hungarian landowner and yachtsman
- The Blessed László Batthyány-Strattmann (1870–1931), a noble Hungarian doctor and landowner
