= Zwerger =

Zwerger is a German surname. Notable people with the surname include:

- Dominic Zwerger (born 1996), Austrian ice hockey player
- Johannes Zwerger (1824–1893), Austrian priest
- Lisbeth Zwerger (born 1954), Austrian illustrator
