= Güssing =

Town in Burgenland, Austria

- Municipality
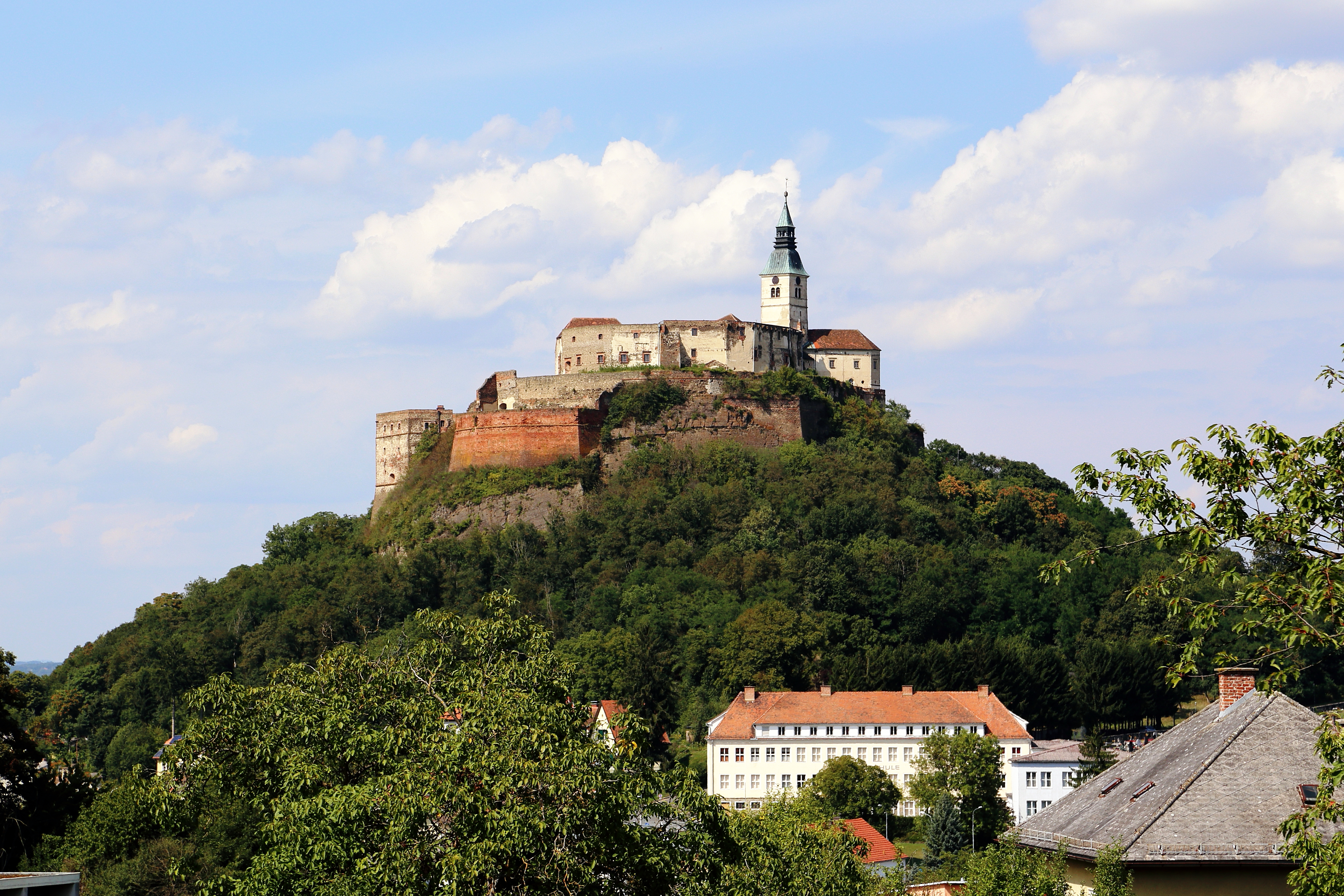
- Güssing Castle

- Coat of arms

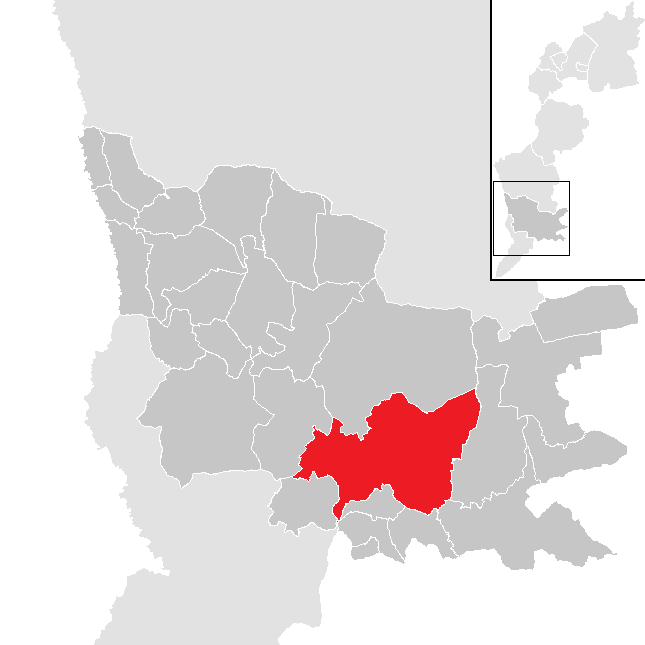
- Location within Güssing district

- Location within Austria
- Coordinates: 47°4′N 16°19′E
- Country: Austria
- State: Burgenland
- District: Güssing

Government
  - Mayor: Vinzenz Knor ((SPÖ))

Area
  - Total: 49.31 km^{2} (19.04 sq mi)
- Elevation: 229 m (751 ft)

Population (2023)
  - Total: 3,610
  - Density: 73.2/km^{2} (190/sq mi)
- Time zone: UTC+1 (CET)
  - Summer (DST): UTC+2 (CEST)
- Postal code: 7540
- Website: www.guessing.co.at

Güssing (German pronunciation: [ˈɡʏsɪŋ]; Hungarian: Németújvár, Német-Újvár, Croatian: Novi Grad) is a town in Burgenland, Austria. It is located at 47°4′N 16°19′E, with a population of 3,610 (2023), and is the administrative center of the Güssing district. For centuries the town occupied an important position on the western edge of the Kingdom of Hungary. The town is now most famous for its castle, which is the oldest in Burgenland and a prominent regional landmark, built on an extinct volcano.

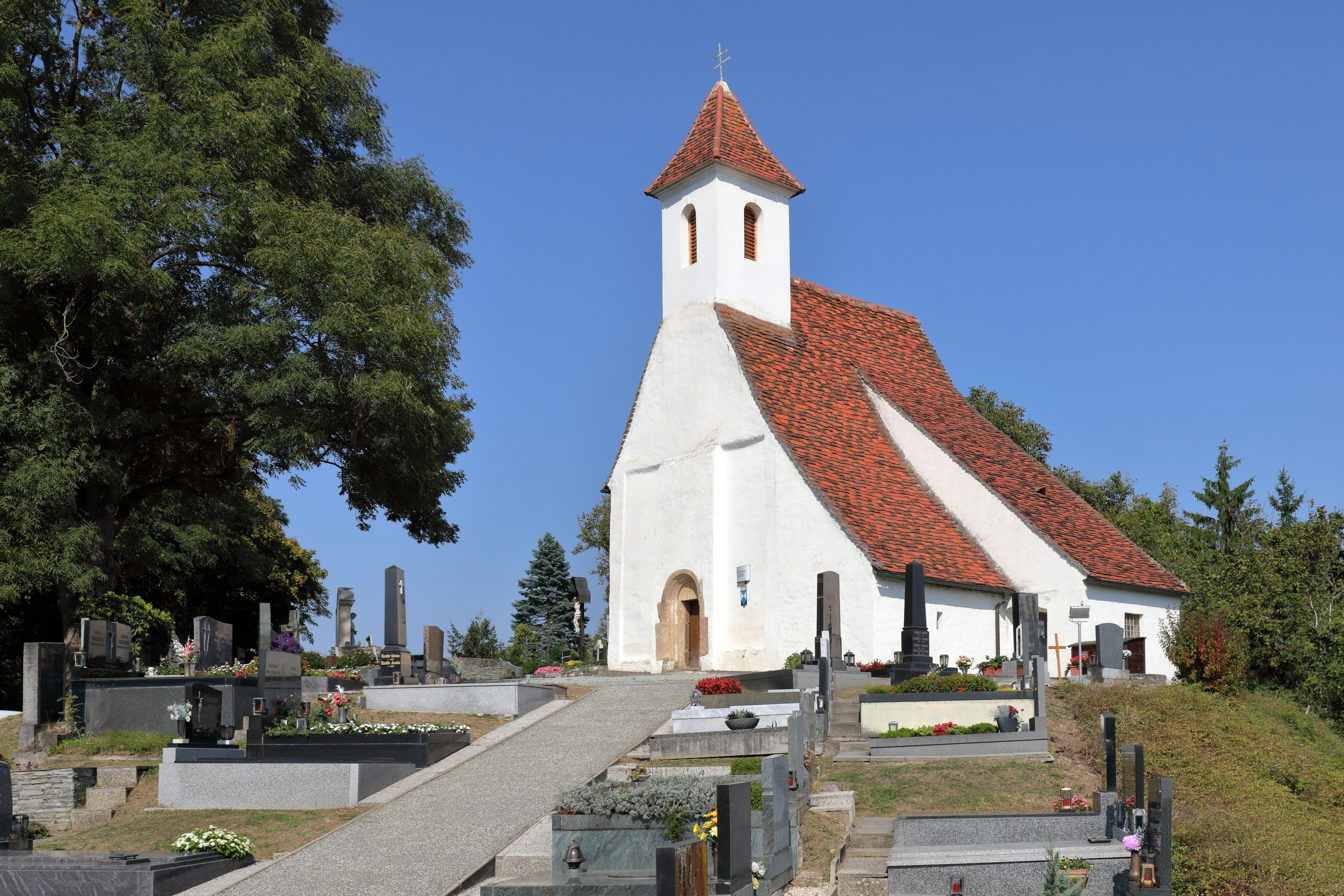
Parish and cemetery church

== History ==
=== Overview ===
The origins of Güssing date back to 1157, with the construction of the castle alongside a small settlement nearby. By 1355, Güssing had been granted special rights by Louis IV. During the Middle Ages, religion, art and crafts were of great importance. As a border town, Güssing was fortified in order to repel attacks from what is now Hungary. Despite the threat of invasion Güssing prospered, with residents of the town at the time including the Artois botanist Carolus Clusius, and Johann Manlius, a typographer. There is an homage to Clusius in the town, as well as a street named after him, the Clusiusweg.

In the 16th century, Güssing was a free imperial city with full municipal laws. In 1619, the town was surrounded with an enceinte, a type of town wall. The town at the time contained four quarters- Vorstadt, untere Stadt by the mansion of the Drašković family, innere Stadt from the monastery to the town hall and Hochstadt.

The lords of Güssing (in Hungarian: Kőszeg, in Slovak: Kysak) were a noble family in the frontier region of Austria and the Kingdom of Hungary. Note that Kőszeg is the name of a nearby Hungarian town (known as Güns in German) to which that family moved its residence from Güssing in 1274. In 1522, it became the residence of the Batthyány family, one of the most distinguished magnate families in Hungary. The family still Batthyány own the ancestral seat of Güssing Castle. In 1540, Franz Batthyány gained the magnate from Ferdinand I, the incumbent king of Hungary, Croatia and Bohemia, which allowed him to open up ore mines, whilst in 1549, he was granted the right to hold markets in the town by the emperor. A market still takes place on the first Monday of every month in the town.

The area, like the rest of what is now Burgenland, belonged to Hungary until 1921. From 1898, the town had to use the Hungarian place name Németújvár due to the Magyarization policies of the government in Budapest. After the end of the First World War, the town, as part of German West Hungary (Deutsch Westungarn), was ceded to Austria after tough negotiations in the Treaty of Saint-Germain-en-Laye and the Treaty of Trianon in 1919. The area has been part of the newly formed state of Burgenland since 1921. In 1973 the area was officially declared a town.

In the 20th century, Güssing struggled economically due to its proximity to the Hungarian border, and with it the Iron Curtain during the Cold War. Many residents moved elsewhere or commuted for long distances to find work.

== Geography ==
The town is situated in the south of Burgenland, close to the Hungarian border, in the valley of the river Strem at a height of 229 metres above sea level. Just under half of the area is agricultural land, whilst nearly 40% is forested. The town is neighboured by Tobaj to the north, Strem to the east, Heiligenbrunn to the southeast, Kleinmürbisch and Großmürbisch to the south, Neustift bei Güssing to the southwest and Gerersdorf-Sulz to the northwest. The Güssing fish ponds are a designated Ramsar site within the town, known for its bird populations of little bittern, grey heron and great crested grebe.

=== Renewable energy ===
The town is also known for its renewable energy projects. During the 1980s, Peter Vadasz, a local councillor, and Reinhard Koch, a technical engineer, created an energy transition strategy for the town by using local wood as an energy source. In 1992, Vadasz was elected mayor of Güssing and worked towards this energy transition. This transition was not only devised for public buildings in the town, but for the whole district as well. In order to achieve this goal, public buildings were insulated and biomass heat plants were built. More recently, an anaerobic digestion plant was built. Local authorities have claimed this has led to full energy self-sufficiency in the district, yet this is disputed by others, who claim that transportation of goods and fuel still relies upon fossil fuels. Energy in Güssing is heavily reliant on wood, which has led to concerns about energy security.

== International Relations ==
Güssing is twinned with:

- Nijlen, Belgium
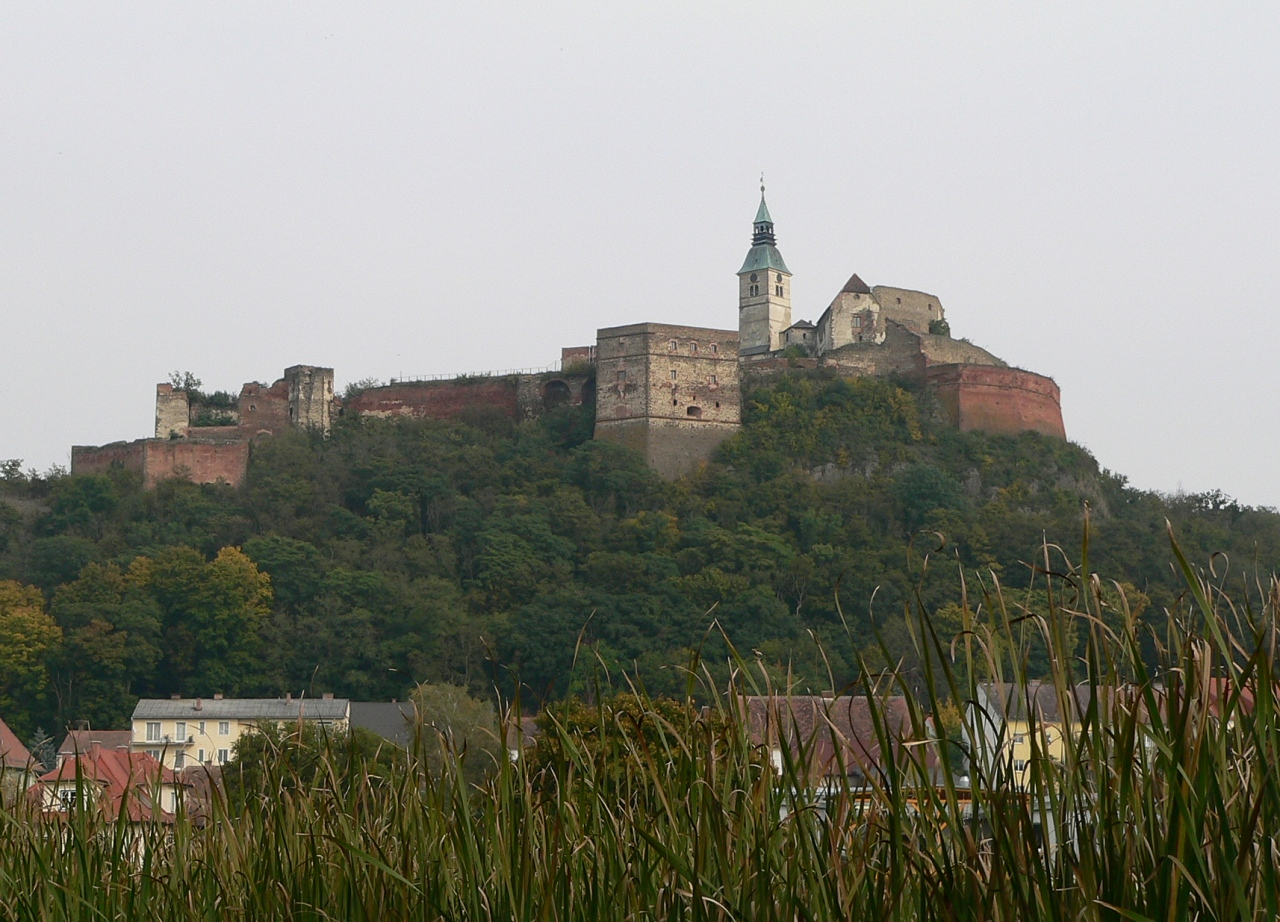
Güssing Castle

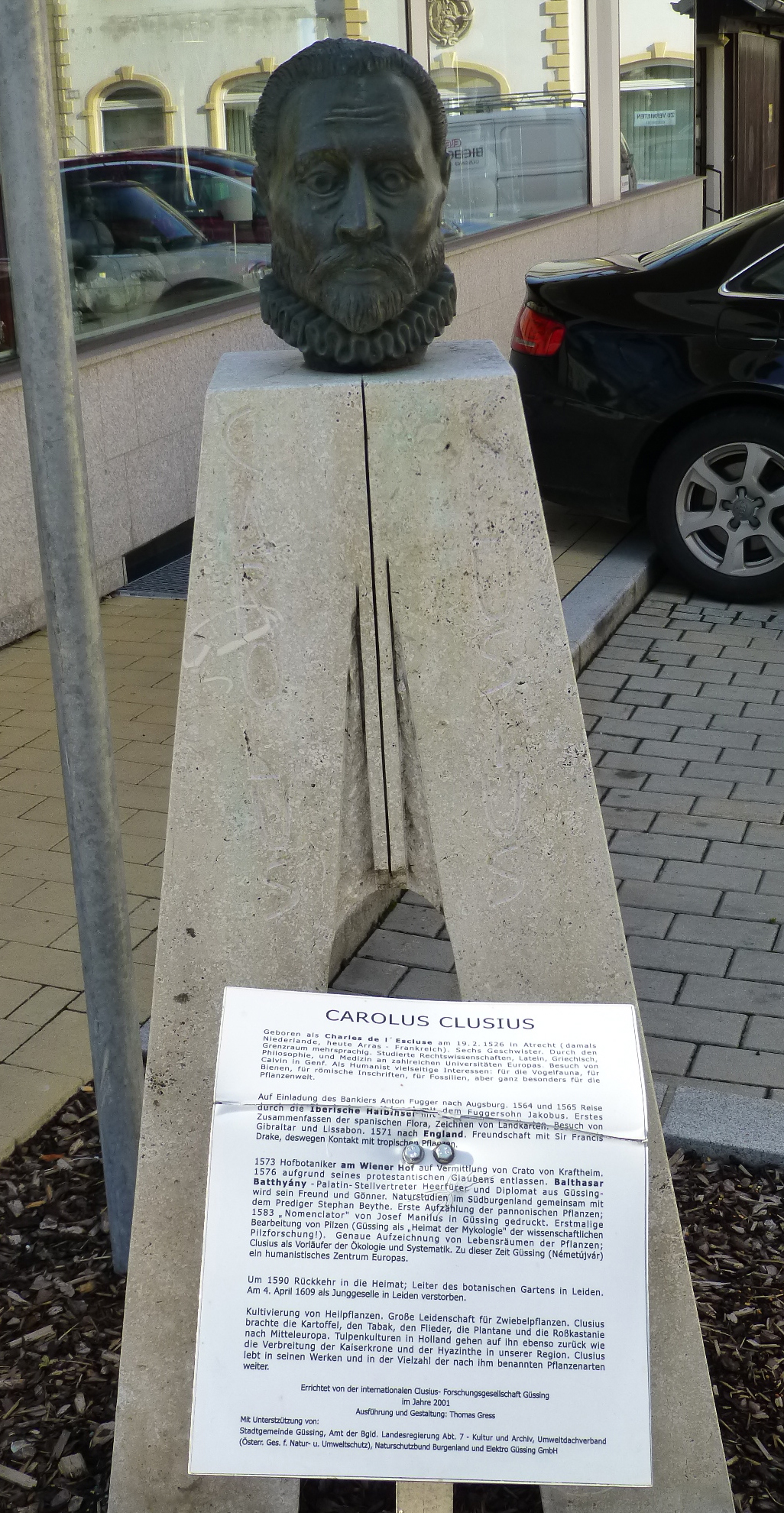
An homage to Carolus Clusius, a resident of the town

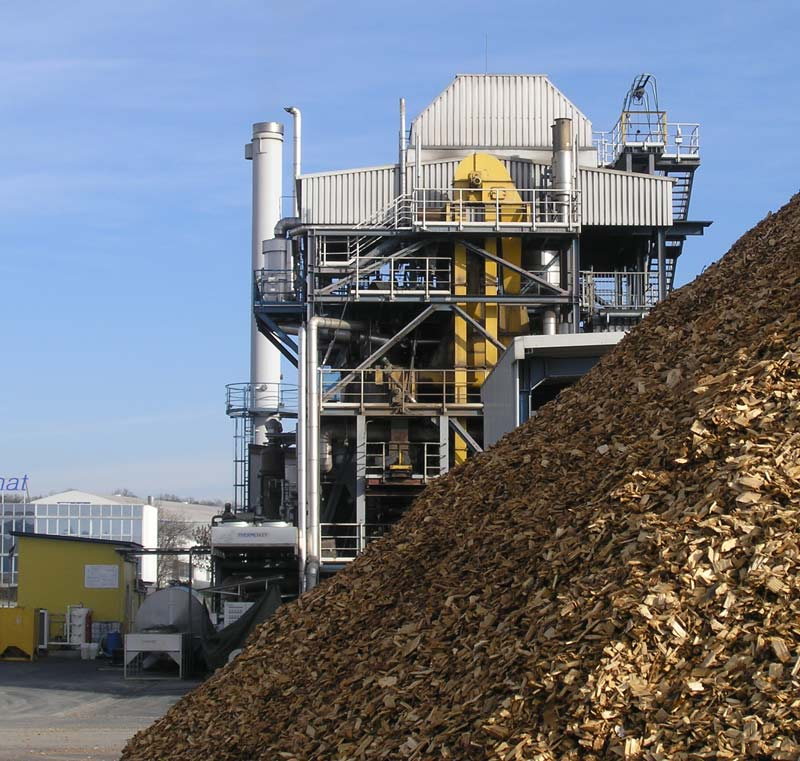
Wood gasifier (commercial operation)

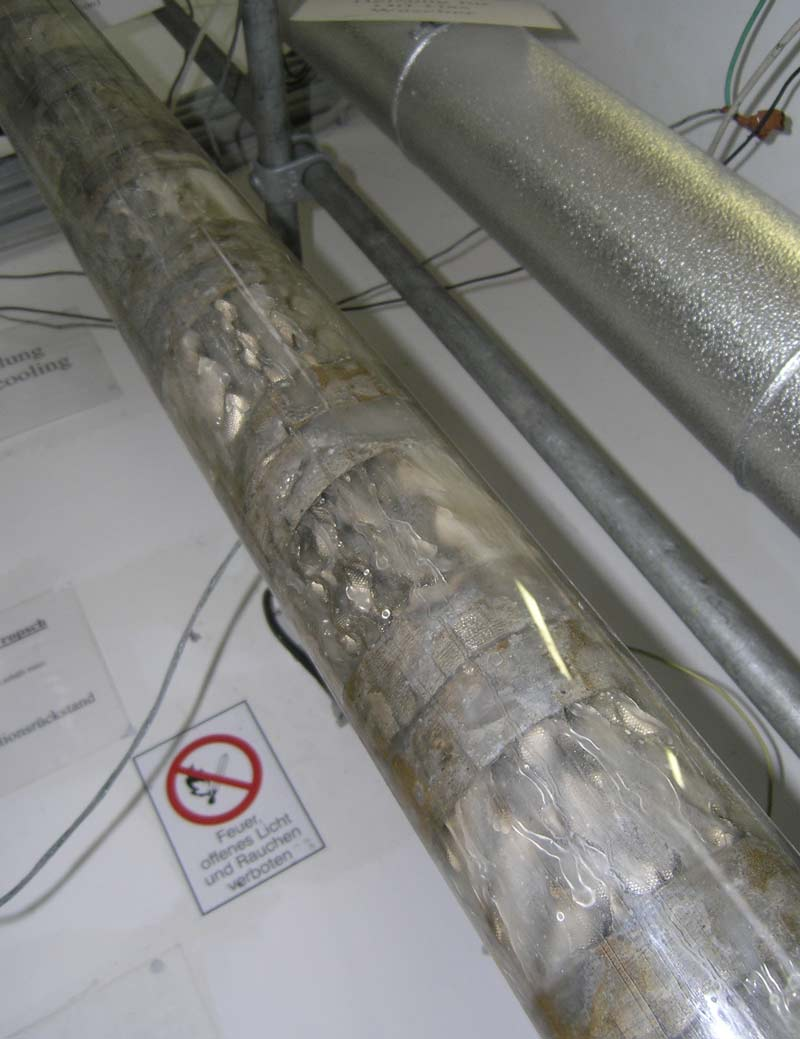
Fischer-Tropsch diesel production from gasified wood (Pilot)

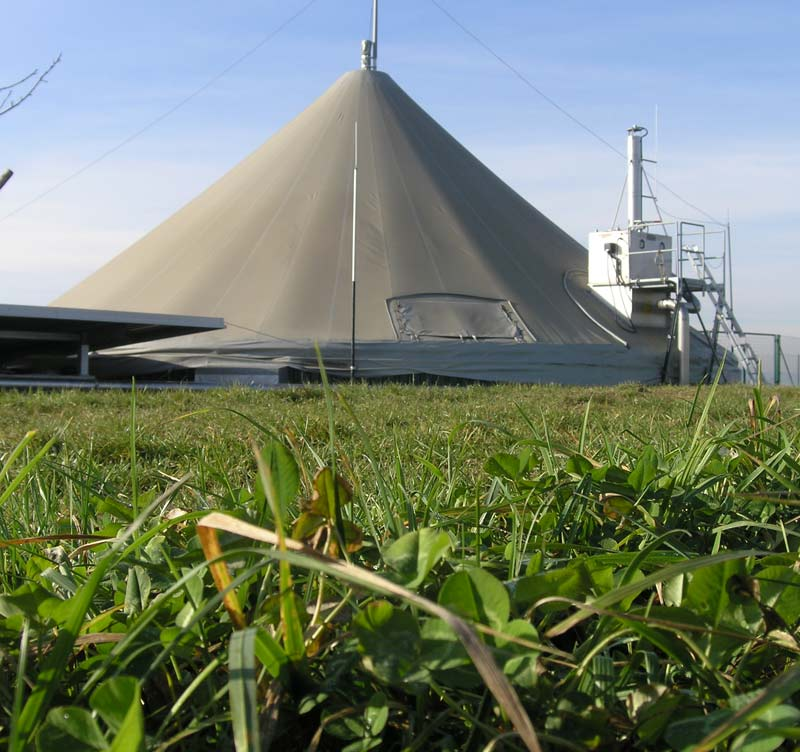
Biogas plant Strem

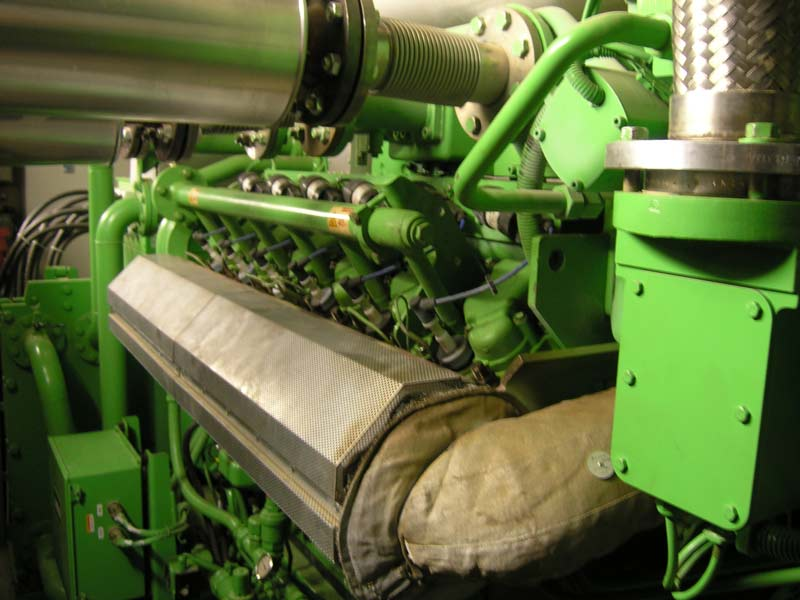
Biogas fuelled engine Biogas plant Strem

=== Neighbourhoods ===
The neighbourhoods that make up the town area include (with the population as of January 2021 in brackets):

- Glasing (123) with the Glasing mountains
- Güssing (Kernstadt) (2725) with Langzeil, Ludwigshof and Rosenberg
- Krottendorf (212)
- Sankt Nikolaus (193)
- Steingraben (182)
- Urbersdorf (230)

== Culture ==
- The main attraction of the district is Güssing castle. Built on a volcanic cone, the castle is known for its exhibition "400 years of art", the gothic castle chapel (with a neo-Gothic, wooden carved high altar, an old chest organ and a baroque side altar. The castle also contains a museum and a restaurant.
- A romanesque parish church dates back to the 1200s, with a cemetery nearby.
- The town contains a Franciscan monastery, which was built at the same time as a bastion of the town wall and a monastic church, the Visitation of Mary church. Built in 1863, the monastery contains a range of renaissance architectural elements. The monastery is also noted for a paramental shrine in the sacristy and the library with many unique works from the age of Protestantism. Under the monastery is the crypt of the family Batthyány, which is the second largest of its kind in Austria, with a state coffin by K. Moll. There is also a shrine depicting the beatification of László Batthyány-Strattmann.
- There is a two-storey, castle like arcade in the town.
- In the east of the town is the family home of the Drašković family. This is a classicist style mansion with empire style furniture and a gothic winged altar from 1450 in the house chapel.

=== Regular events ===
- Musical Güssing: The cultural association hosts several events each year. In late January a carnival show takes place in the heart of Güssing. Every September a well-known musical show is performed, in which amateurs and professionals work together. The actor and singer Florian Resetarits (de) began his career in these musicals.
- Castle performances: For the last 500 years, Güssing has been a cultural centre, with the theatre being of particular significance. The castle performances are a highlight of the summer programme. The actor Frank Hoffmann was the most recent director of the Güssing summer programme, as part of which performances take place at Güssing castle. The Güssing castle association hosts theatre performances for adults and children on the fairground at the foot of the castle.

=== Sport ===
The town has a football club, SV Güssing, which play in the Landesliga Burgenland, the fourth division of Austrian football. The town is home to a basketball club, UBC Güssing Knights.

== Notable people ==
- Batthyány-Strattmann family
  - Ferenc Batthyány (Croatian: Franjo Baćan) (1497, Buda - 1566) (hu)
  - Ignaz Batthyány (1741–1798), Bishop of Transylvania (de)
  - Gusztáv, 5th Prince Batthyány-Strattmann (1803–1883), owner and breeder of race-horses
  - Prince Edmund Batthyany-Strattmann (1826–1914)
  - Prince László Batthyány-Strattmann (1870, Dunakiliti - 1931), doctor and blessed of the Roman Catholic Church
- István Beythe (1532–1612), bishop, botanist (hu)
- Julia Dujmovits (born 1987), snowboarder
- Ferenc Faludi (German: Franz Faludi, 1704–1779) (de)
- Samuel Steinherz, errorly "Steinberg" (1857–1942), Jewish historian born here
- Josef Reichl (1860–1924)
- Carolus Clusius (1526–1609)
- Jenő Nagy (1898–1944) (hu)
- Otto Kery (1923–2006), director, editor, actor (de)
- Peter Vadasz (born 1944), City Mayor
- Reinhard Koch (born 1959), together with Vadas the "creator" of energy-independent Güssing
- Josef Trinkl (1951–2004), politician (de)
- Heinz Janisch (born 1960), author
- Ägidius Zsifkovics (born 1963), theologian, Bishop of Eisenstadt
- Sabine James circus-artist, harpist, performer, theatre-director (Burgspiele Güssing)
- Martin Stranzl (born 1980), football player
- Michael Miksits (born 1981), football player (de)
- Peter Traxler (born 1946), Kabarettist
- Csákányi László (1921–1992), színész, schauspieler (hu)

== See also ==
- Wildpoldsried
- 100% renewable energy
