= Sándor Bejczy =

Hungarian politician (1920–2004)

Member of the National Assembly
- In office 2 May 1990 – 27 June 1994

Personal details
- Born: 1920 Körmend, Hungary
- Died: 2004 (aged 83–84)
- Party: FKGP, EKGP

Sándor Bejczy (1920–2004) was a Hungarian politician, member of the National Assembly (MP) from FKGP National List between 1990 and 1994.

== Biography ==
He was born in Körmend. He served as chief treasurer of the FKGP from 1945 to 1951. He participated in the reorganization of the FKGP during the Hungarian Revolution of 1956. As a result, he was interned in the next year.

Bejczy secured a mandate in the first democratic parliamentary election in 1990. He was a member of the Committee on Defence from 12 June 1990 and of the Committee on Audit Office from 13 October 1992. In February 1992 he joined the United Smallholders' Party (EKGP) which continued to support the Cabinet of József Antall in contrast to the FKGP parliamentary group led by József Torgyán. Bejczy died in 2004.
