= Sonnen GmbH =

German energy storage provider

sonnen GmbH
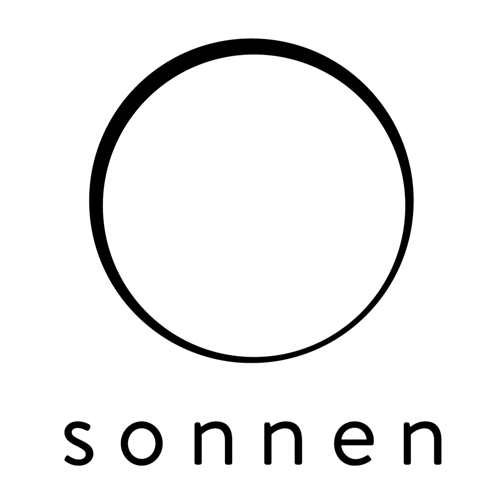
- Trade name: sonnen
- Type: GmbH
- Industry: Energy industry
- Founded: 2010 in Wildpoldsried, Germany
- Founder: Christoph Ostermann and Torsten Stiefenhofer
- Headquarters: Wildpoldsried, Germany
- Key people: Oliver Koch; Hermann Schweizer; Caroline Möschel; Nathan Dunn
- Revenue: ▲€42 million (2016)
- Owner: Royal Dutch Shell
- Number of employees: ▲300 (2017)
- Website: sonnengroup.com

sonnen GmbH (proprietary name and abbreviated form: sonnen) is a company in the energy industry headquartered in Wildpoldsried in the district of Oberallgäu, Germany. It produces home energy storage systems for private households and small businesses. The company is considered the market leader in Germany and additional international markets. Moreover, it is the center of a community for supplying power from renewable energies.

== Company development ==
=== Company ===
Christoph Ostermann and Torsten Stiefenhofer founded the company in 2010 as a GmbH (German limited liability company). The legal name of the company at that time was PROSOL Invest Deutschland GmbH. In December 2013, the shareholders' meeting decided to change the company name to sonnenBatterie GmbH, in order to adopt the name of its product range and to support the goal of internationalization. Since November 2015, the company has operated as sonnen, under which all the company's individual activities are organized.

=== Business development ===
From 2008 to 2010 above all founder Torsten Stiefenhofer developed a home battery marketed from 2011 under the name of sonnenBatterie. As a solar battery, the product is geared especially to independent homeowners with a photovoltaic system. As of mid-2016, eight generations of this power storage system have been developed and marketed. Germany is the main sales market for the devices. The company also distributes the home batteries in Austria, Switzerland, United Kingdom, Ireland, Slovakia, Czech Republic, Italy, Netherlands, Sweden, Norway, the United States and Australia (current as of: October 2016).

Along with the renaming of the company to Sonnen GmbH, the company announced in November 2015 that starting in 2016, it would establish its own power community, whose members can trade power among themselves. Since September 2016, owners of a sonnenBatterie, who are a member of this power community, can obtain electricity at a flat rate.

At the beginning of May 2017, TenneT and sonnen announced their plans to implement decentralized photovoltaic domestic storage batteries using blockchain technology to help stabilize the power grid and improve the integration of renewable energies. This offers a new source of income to sonnen customers who take part in the system. Furthermore, the planned blockchain pilot project is meant to improve and simplify the networking of storage batteries, photovoltaic systems and power grids, as well as make them more efficient. From an economic perspective, this technology and sonnen’s battery pool (sonnenCommunity) could reduce the redispatching costs for stabilizing the power grid.

== Business fields ==
=== Power storage ===
Like other home storage systems, the sonnenBatterie from sonnen is also designed to increase the rate of own consumption of self-produced energy. Usually, a level of self-consumption of 30 to 55 percent can be reached with a photovoltaic system, when using smart-home functions. With a storage system, this rate is around 60 to 80 percent, as the self-produced electricity can be stored until it is consumed within the household. There is less need to source external electricity, especially mornings or evenings.

Since its market launch, the company has designed the sonnenBatterie as a fully integrated system. In addition to the battery modules, it has an integrated power inverter, a unit for power management, along with electronic meters for power consumption in the building, for photovoltaic power generation and for feeding power into the grid or power-sharing in connection with the sonnenCommunity. The power management system evaluates the user's consumption data and takes weather statistics into account, in order to determine the optimal time intervals for charging and discharging the storage system. Moreover, the sonnenBatterie can be combined with heat pumps, small wind turbines or combined heat and power plants.

The storage elements deployed are lithium iron phosphate batteries. Sony is the main supplier of these components. The various models of the system differ above all in their rated capacity, expressed in kilowatt hours. In Germany, Sonnen was one of the first suppliers of lithium-ion batteries for stationary use in homes and is considered market leader in Germany and globally. Products are not distributed via wholesale trade but through selected specialty dealers. From 2011 to mid-October 2016, 15,000 units were sold. Most went to homeowners, along with farmers and small businesses.

=== Community ===
Since the first quarter of the year 2016, the company has organized the sonnenCommunity. It involves a power producer community of photovoltaic system operators (homeowners and small business owners), who share surplus power with one another. In order to fill any power gaps in times when there is less sunlight, biogas systems are also included. Operators of small wind generators can also supply the community with power.

The community combines three elements: the use of decentralized power generation, modern battery storage technology and digital networking of the participants. The concept is geared towards sonnen customers. The company grants prospective members a discount on the sonnenBatterie if they join the community. All members source power from the community at prices lower than from the grid. Moreover, sonnen handles the sale of surplus community power for them.

By building up and expanding the community, the company hopes to boost sales of its sonnenBatterie. Besides, each community member pays a monthly fee to sonnen. The company in return handles the metering infrastructure and the software.

The number of members at the beginning of October 2016 was around 3,000 households. In May 2016, the company began building up the community in Austria. The launch of the Swiss customer platform is announced for the 3rd quarter of 2016.

Since September 2016, owners of a sonnenBatterie who are members of the sonnenCommunity can obtain electricity at a flat rate.

== Shareholders ==
In addition to the founders, several financial investors have equity stakes in the company (current as of: October 2016):

- In January 2013, eCAPITAL entrepreneurial Partners AG, acquired a 30 percent share in the company for EUR 3 million.
- The investment by Chrysalix SET Management B.V. (SET Ventures) and Munich Venture Partners was made at the end of 2014 as part of a capital increase of EUR 7.5 million, in which eCAPITAL also participated.
- In mid-2015, Inven Capital, investiční fond, a.s., a subsidiary of the Czech energy firm ČEZ, invested in the Allgäu-based company as part of an additional capital increase. The investment involved a high single-digit sum in the millions.
- In June 2016, sonnen enlisted GE Ventures, the venture capital subsidiary of General Electric, as an additional investor.
- In October 2016, the company closed another funding round, resulting in EUR 76 million. All previous investors were involved. The Chinese corporate group Envision Energy and Thomas Pütter, formerly CEO and ex-chairman of Allianz Capital Partners, were added as new investors.
- In February 2019, it was announced that Royal Dutch Shell would acquire 100% of the company for an undisclosed amount.
- In the middle of 2026, Shell sold Sonnen to Tiven. In October 2026, Sonnen Germany filed for insolvency, while Sonnen USA expects US business to continue.

== Management and human resources ==
Up until the end of 2014, the founders managed the company.

At the beginning of 2015, there were changes in the management team. Hermann Schweizer replaced Torsten Stiefenhofer. The latter has since assumed the duties of Chief Innovation Officer. At the same time, the management team was supplemented by Oliver Koch, who had previously converted individual production of the battery systems over to series production.

Starting in October 2015, Philipp Schröder switched from Tesla Motors back to the then sonnenBatterie GmbH and is responsible as a member of management for Sales and Marketing. Within a few months, six additional Tesla managers followed him.

Since the company's founding up to the summer of 2016, the number of employees has increased 20-fold. In June 2016 it was roughly 200, of whom 140 were employed in Wildpoldsried. In September 2016, the number of employees was 250 in total. At the beginning of 2017, some 300 employees worked for the company.

== Locations ==
Up to the end of 2015, the company manufactured its battery storage systems exclusively in Wildpoldsried. Here production occurred for marketing under the company's own name and also as a white-label manufacturer for companies such as SolarWorld and RWE. In 2015, the company established a production facility in San Jose, California. Here the company has been producing for the US market since the end of 2015. In June 2015, the company set up a location in Atlanta (Georgia) for research and development, in order to adapt its own products to the conditions in the United States market.

== Awards ==
The company has received several prizes and awards:

- In 2017, it received the Zayed Future Energy Prize in the category Small and medium-sized enterprises.
- The Massachusetts Institute of Technology (MIT) honored the company in 2016 as one of the 50 Smartest Companies 2016 worldwide.
- Out of 6,900 candidates, the company was inducted into the Global Cleantech 100 list for the year 2015 at the Cleantech Forum in San Francisco. The panel of judges consider it one of the most innovative companies in the category of Europe & Israel.
- sonnen GmbH was among the winners in the comparison of home batteries carried out by the market and social research firm EuPD Research and the results of which were published by Wirtschaftswoche in June 2016.
- The company is among the winners of the StartGreen Award 2015.
- In October 2015, the company was dubbed Wachstumschampion by Focus magazine. According to a statement by Focus and Statista, the company was among the ten fastest-growing enterprises in Germany.
- In 2014, the company received the EUR 100,000 Step-Award from FAZ-Institut and the industrial park operator Intraserv GmbH & Co. Höchst KG.

== Memberships ==
The company is a member of the Arbeitsgruppe Energiespeicher of the Bundesverband Solarwirtschaft and member of the Bundesverband Energiespeicher (BVES).
