= Wildpoldsried =

- Municipality
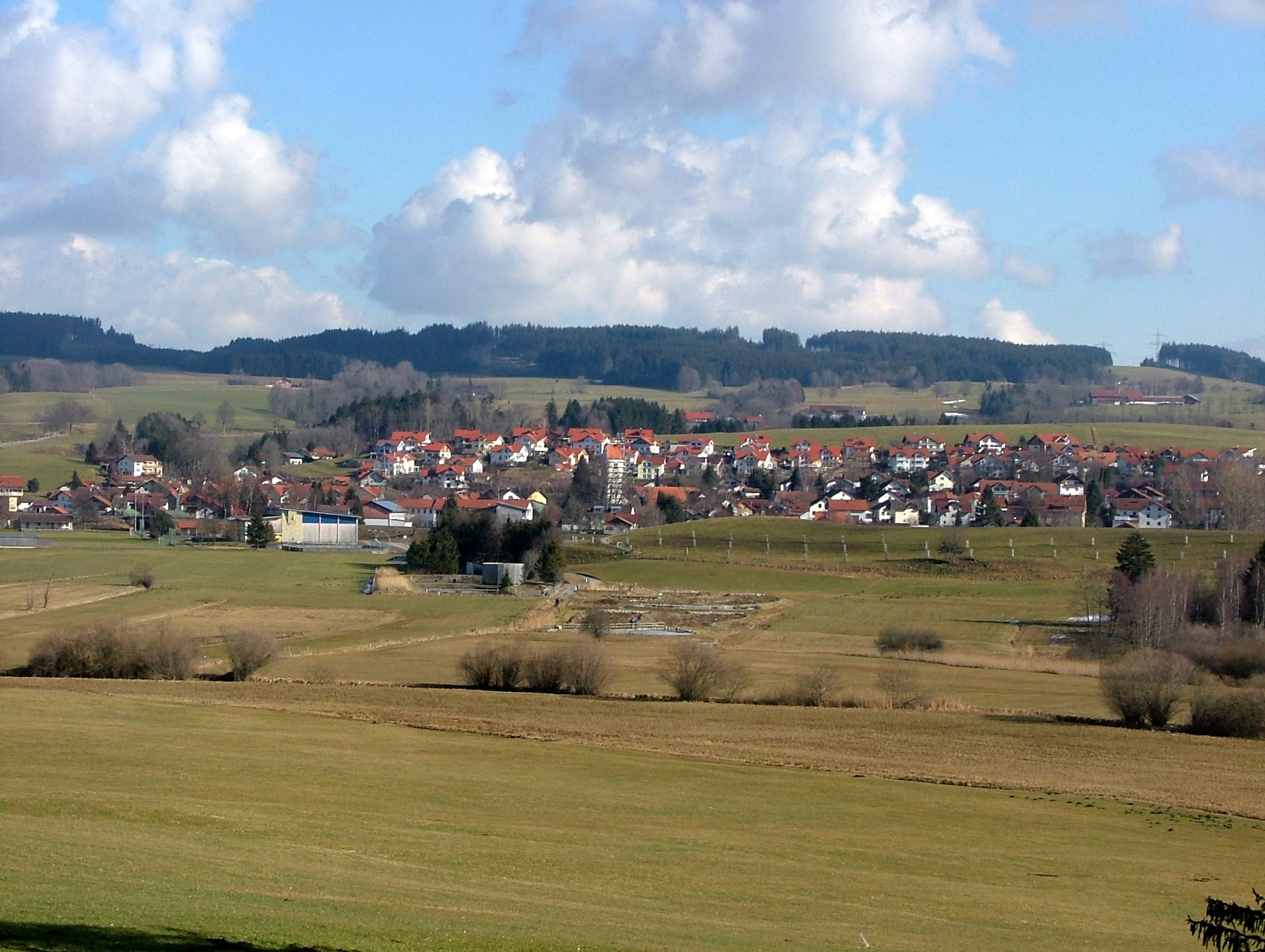
- Wildpoldsried

- Coat of arms

- Location of Wildpoldsried within Oberallgäu district
- Interactive map of Wildpoldsried
- Location within Germany Location within Bavaria
- Coordinates: 47°46′N 10°24′E
- Country: Germany
- State: Bavaria
- Admin. region: Schwaben
- District: Oberallgäu

Government
  - Mayor (2020–26): Renate Deniffel

Area
  - Total: 21.36 km^{2} (8.25 sq mi)
- Elevation: 724 m (2,375 ft)

Population (2025-12-31)
  - Total: 2,586
  - Density: 121.1/km^{2} (313.6/sq mi)
- Time zone: UTC+01:00 (CET)
  - Summer (DST): UTC+02:00 (CEST)
- Postal codes: 87499
- Dialling codes: 08304
- Vehicle registration: OA
- Website: www.wildpoldsried.de

Wildpoldsried (German pronunciation: [ˈvɪltpɔltsˌʁiːt]) is a municipality in the district of Oberallgäu in Bavaria in Germany. The village has been recognized for its exceptional achievements in renewable energy production and in reducing its carbon footprint.

== History ==
The earliest known reference to Wildpoldsried dates to 1392, when it was mentioned in documents relating to the sale of the nearby Wolkenberg castle. Later, it was the seat of the Lower and Upper courts of the Abbey of Kempten, a Benedictine monastery. Secularization took place in 1803, and the municipality was formalized in 1818, in accordance with the laws of the Kingdom of Bavaria.

== Renewable Energy in Wildpoldsried ==
In 1997, people of Wildpoldsried, in some cases acting as individuals, began a series of projects that produce renewable energy. The first efforts were wind turbines and biomass digesters for cogeneration of heat and power. In the time since, new work has included a number of energy conservation projects, more wind and biomass use, small hydro plants, photovoltaic panels on private houses, and district heating. Tied to this are ecological flood control and wastewater systems.

Today, the effects of this are an unforeseen level of prosperity resulting in construction of nine new community buildings, including a school, gymnasium, and community hall, complete with solar panels. There are three companies operating four biogas digesters with a fifth under construction. As of 2021, there are nine windmills located on the nearby range of hills. One hundred and ninety private households are equipped with solar, which pays them dividends. The district heating network has 42 connections. There are three small hydro power plants. By 2011, Wildpoldsried produced 321 percent more energy than it needs and generated 4.0 million Euro in annual revenue. At the same time, there was a 65% reduction in the town’s carbon footprint. Three years later, the village was producing five times the energy it consumed. Wildpoldsried is the headquarters of sonnen GmbH, a company that makes home energy storage systems that are typically coupled with rooftop solar power systems.

== See also ==
- Güssing
- 100% renewable energy
