= Ferenc Faludi =

Hungarian poet

Ferenc Faludi (born in Güssing on 11 April 1704; died in Rechnitz on 18 December 1779) was a Hungarian poet who has been referred to as "the father of the new Hungarian lyric." Because of Suppression of the Society of Jesus he switched to being in charge of a poorhouse. Before that he had been known as a Jesuit educator, writer, and translator. He spoke near-fluent German and translated William Shakespeare's The Tempest into Hungarian. In addition to that he collected Hungarian folk poetry.
