= Josef Reichl =

German-language dialect poet from Burgenland (1860–1924)

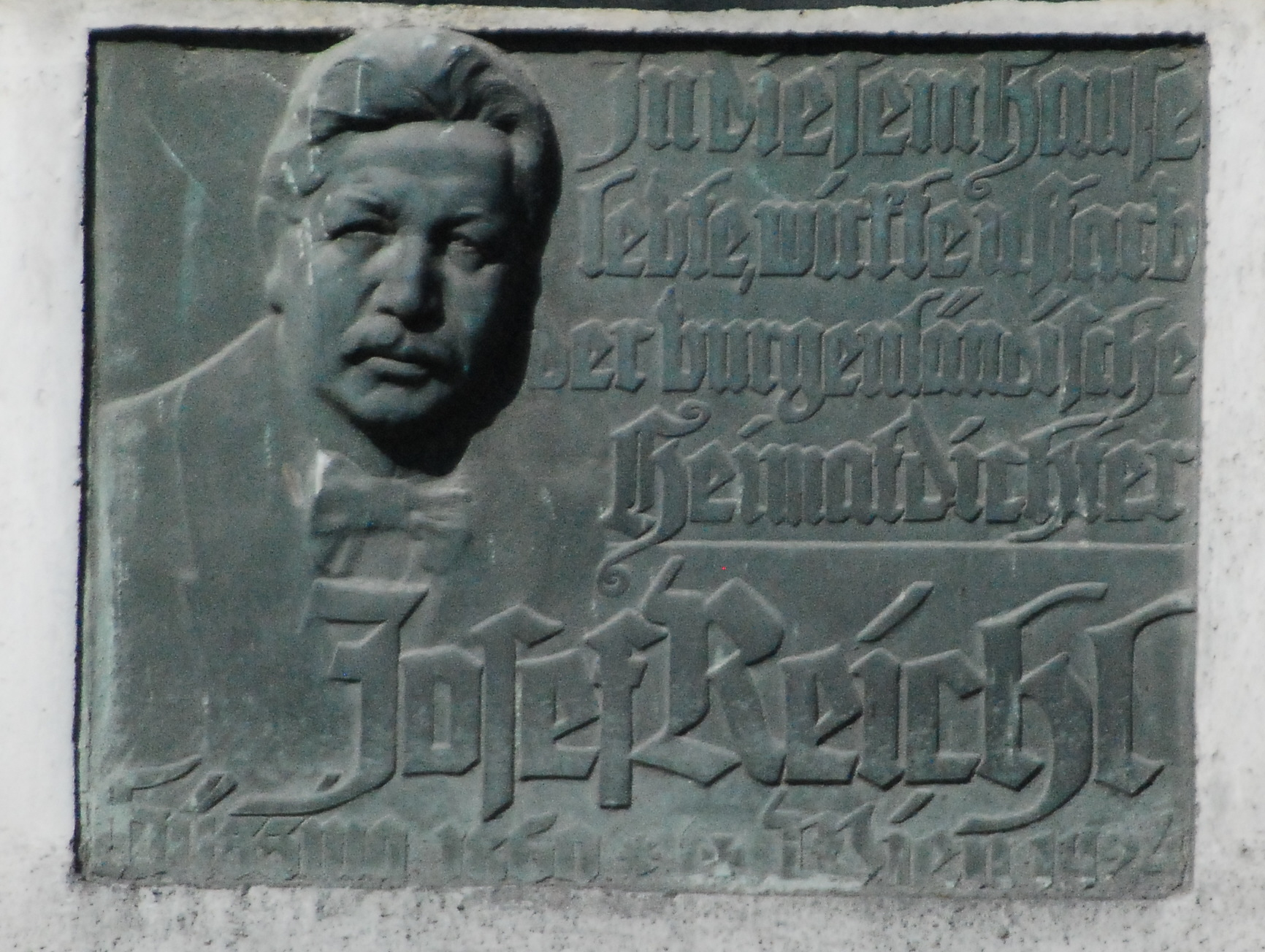
- Memorial plaque on his former home on the Sechshauser / Mariahilfer Gürtel in Rudolfsheim-Fünfhaus, the 15th district of Vienna
- Born: 19 June 1860; Güssing, Kingdom of Hungary
- Died: 9 December 1924 (aged 64); Vienna, Austria
- Resting place: Vienna Central Cemetery
- Occupations: Poet, writer, hatter
- Children: Kurt Reichl
- Parent(s): Peter Reichl; Anna Plank
- Writing career
- Language: German (Heanzisch dialect)
- Genres: Dialect poetry, short stories, folk drama
- Notable works: Hinta Pfluag und Aarn; Va Gmüat za Gmüat; Landflucht und Hoamweh

Notes
- Some biographical dictionaries give his birthplace as Krottendorf bei Güssing; see text.

Josef Reichl (19 June 1860 – 9 December 1924) was a German-language poet and writer born in Güssing (Hungarian: Németújvár, Croatian: Novigrad), then in the Kingdom of Hungary and now in Burgenland, Austria. He wrote in the Heanzisch dialect (also spelled Hianzisch; a Bavarian dialect of German) and is regarded in Burgenland as the province's folk poet.

== Life ==
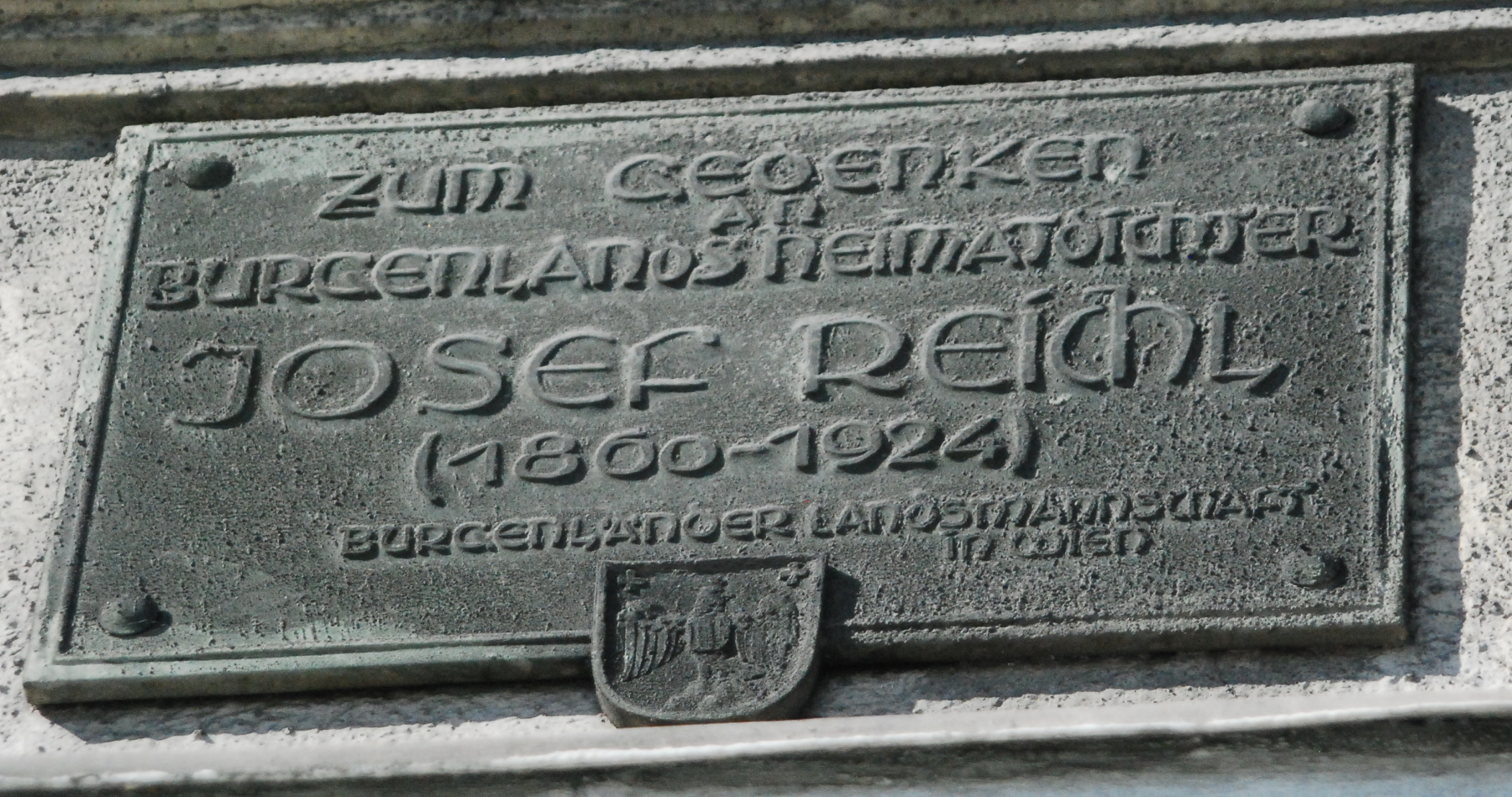
Text of the memorial plaque in Vienna

Reichl was the son of Peter Reichl and Anna Plank, landless agricultural labourers (day labourers). He was born on 19 June 1860 in house no. 57 in Güssing (today Josef-Reichl-Straße 4). An earlier brother, also named Josef, had died in childhood, which is why he received the same given name. He had a sister, Franziska (born 1851), and an older brother, Johann.

The Österreichisches Biographisches Lexikon 1815–1950 and the German Wikipedia, following Hans Levar's 1930 biography, give his birthplace as neighbouring Krottendorf bei Güssing (Hungarian: Békafalu, Croatian: Žablje Selo). In 1860 that village was an independent municipality in Vas County; it has been part of Güssing since 1940.

The family later moved to Langzeil (Hungarian: Hosszúsor, now part of Güssing) and shortly afterwards to Neumarkt an der Raab (Hungarian: Farkasdifalva). He attended school in Sankt Martin an der Raab (Hungarian: Rábaszentmárton). Because of his family's poverty he was unable to study or enter the priesthood. From 1875 to 1879 he was apprenticed as a hatter in Szentgotthárd (German: Sankt Gotthard), then travelled as a journeyman through towns of Austria-Hungary and Germany as far as Brussels. After his father's death he settled in Vienna, where he worked as a hatter, from 1892 as the manager of a hat shop and later as an independent master. Sources differ on the year of his move to Vienna, placing it between 1886 and 1888.

According to Levar's 1930 biography, in 1888 he met the student teacher Alois Herdegen, who recognised and encouraged his poetic talent; together with two of Herdegen's friends (Gärrner and Straßer) they issued a handwritten literary magazine, Kleeblattnachrichten, for two years. In 1892 he left the business of Gärrner's father and was briefly unemployed, then became manager of the Bellerin firm's branch on Gumpendorfer Straße in Mariahilf, Vienna's 6th district; he later bought the branch and set up as an independent master. He joined the literary society Mehr Licht, founded by Herdegen, took lessons in grammar, and attended a recitation course given by the actress Auguste Wilbrandt-Baudius. He married in 1897 and had a son; after his wife's early death he married her sister in 1903.

He published with increasing frequency as a poet. His verse appeared in, among other periodicals, the Munich magazine Die Jugend and the Meggendorfer-Blätter, and between 1905 and 1914 some ninety of his poems were printed in Unverfälschte Deutsche Worte, the pan-German journal of Georg Ritter von Schönerer. His first collection of dialect poems, Hinta Pfluag und Aarn (1918), was a considerable success; it was followed in 1921 by Va Gmüat za Gmüat. The last book published in his lifetime was Landflucht und Hoamweh (poems and short stories). In the 1923 story Kroatenhäusl he described the peaceful coexistence of the peoples and denominations of his native region. Some of his poems were set to music, including by Camillo Horn. A few days before his death, his folk play Laondflucht was premièred at the Thaliatheater in Vienna.

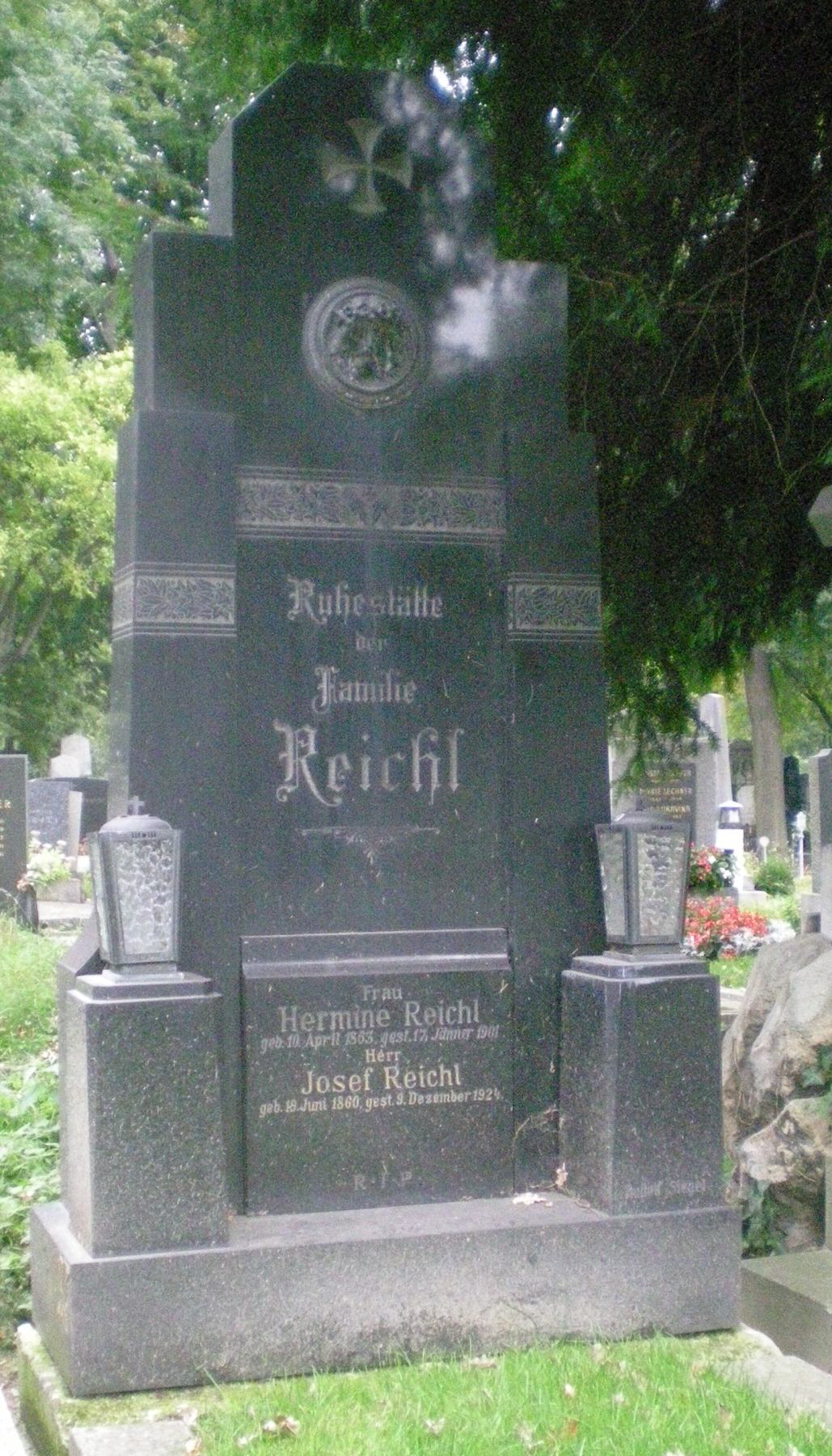
Reichl's grave at the Vienna Central Cemetery

Reichl died in Vienna on 9 December 1924. A planned burial in Sankt Martin an der Raab did not take place; he was buried on 12 December at the Vienna Central Cemetery. His son, Kurt Reichl, later continued the family's hat business in Vienna.

=== Political activity ===
His political career was not free of contradictions. In Vienna he associated with pan-German circles. Through Josef Patry he came into contact with the Verein zur Erhaltung des Deutschtums in Ungarn (Association for the Preservation of Germandom in Hungary), founded in Vienna on 9 March 1907, in which he was an active lecturer. On 11 October 1912, at a monthly meeting of the association, he read among other poems "Mei Hoamat", "Laondflucht" and "Ungrische Auswaondrer". The Hungarian authorities banned the association's publications: a postal distribution ban was imposed in 1909–1910, and several counties as well as Budapest took action against what they described as the organisation's "anti-Hungarian agitation".

The first version of his 1911 poem "Ungrische Auswaondrer" contains the line "Von Judn und Odlstaond"; Schuch documents this as an antisemitic verse. Between 1918 and 1921 he campaigned for the annexation of German-speaking West Hungary (the later Burgenland) to Austria. On 21 November 1918 (according to some later accounts, 21 October) he published an appeal, "Die Entscheidungsstunde der Deutschen Westungarns", in which he wrote of liberation from "fifty years of Magyar rule" and from "the old tyranny", and hailed the pan-German (alldeutsch) spirit. In March 1919 he was a member of the advisory board (Beirat) of the Vienna action committee (Aktionskomitee) formed to promote the separation of West Hungary; contemporaries called him the "singer of the Anschluss" (Sänger des Anschlusses), referring to this campaign and not to the annexation of Austria by Nazi Germany in 1938. He also made sharply anti-Hungarian statements in his writings; in the article "Wie es steht", published in Der freie Burgenländer on 20 November 1921, he described the Magyar as master of the land and the others as slaves.

He was a member of the Greater German People's Party (German: Großdeutsche Volkspartei, GDVP), whose programme was largely antisemitic, and was also listed as a representative of the party's Burgenland administrative office (Verwaltungsstelle). On 15 May 1933 the party entered a fighting alliance with the National Socialists; this was after Reichl's death in 1924 and concerns the party, not any later role of his own.

== Works ==
- Vom Deutschtum in Westungarn. In: Von der Heide, 1914.
- Hinta Pfluag und Aarn. Gedichte aus dem Raabtal in heanzerischer Mundart. Vienna, 1918.
- Va Gmüat za Gmüat. Gedichte aus d. Raabtal in heinzischer Mundart. Gerlach & Wiedling, Vienna, 1921.
- Hulzschnitt. Dorfgeschichten in heinz. Mundart. 1922.
- Vamischts! Reime und Prosa. Verlag der Zeitschrift Deutsches Vaterland, Vienna, 1923.
- Das Kroatenhäusl (short story, 1923).
- Landflucht und Hoamweh. 1924.
- Laondflucht (folk play; premièred at the Thaliatheater, Vienna, 1924).

Collected editions:

- Heimat im Herzen. Josef Reichl – Eine Auswahl aus seinen Werken. Volksbildungswerk für das Burgenland, Burgenlandbücher 2, Burgenländische Verlagsanstalt Sexl, Eisenstadt (Hungarian: Kismarton), 1949.
- Werke. 3 vols, ed. Franz Probst, Burgenländische Bibliothek, Edition Roetzer, Eisenstadt, 1981.

== Legacy ==
In Austria he is honoured as a "pioneer" (Vorkämpfer, Wegbereiter) of Burgenland. Streets have been named after him in Güssing, Eisenstadt (Hungarian: Kismarton), Neusiedl am See (Hungarian: Nezsider), and, in 1969, in Meidling, Vienna's 12th district. A memorial plaque marks his birthplace on Josef-Reichl-Straße in Güssing; two plaques are affixed to his former home at Mariahilfer Gürtel 1 in Vienna. The primary school in Sankt Martin an der Raab that he once attended is now the Josef-Reichl-Naturparkschule. A Josef Reichl Museum is housed in the Alte Hofmühle in Güssing. His name is also carried by the Josef-Reichl-Bund association.

On his death the newspaper Sopronvármegye in Sopron (German: Ödenburg) bade farewell to him as a folk poet on 14 December 1924. When Hungarian scholarship mentions him at all, it is primarily as a Viennese voice of the 1918–1921 agitation for the detachment of West Hungary.

Public memory in Burgenland—in dictionary abridgements, anniversary press and memorial plaques—typically emphasises the dialect poet and the province's "pioneer", and is silent about the antisemitic line of 1911, the pan-German press, the antisemitic programme of the Greater German People's Party, and the anti-Hungarian writings. An exception is Schuch's 2000 study, which was published in the Josef Reichl-Bund's own jubilee volume and documents these facts.

== Sources ==
- Behofsits, S. (1988). "Reichl Josef" (PDF). Österreichisches Biographisches Lexikon 1815–1950 (in German). p. 36.
- Schuch, Albert (2000). "Josef Reichl" (in German). st-nikolaus.com.
- Levar, Hans (1930). "Josef Reichl – des Dichters Heimat – sein Leben und Werk". Burgenland (Vierteljahreshefte für Landeskunde, Heimatschutz und Denkmalpflege) (in German). 3: 65 ff.
- "Reichl, Josef". AEIOU / Austria-Forum (in German).
- Tóth, Imre (2006). A nyugat-magyarországi kérdés 1922–1939 (in Hungarian). Sopron.
- Horváth, Sándor. "Review of Tibor Zsiga, Visszacsatolás – Anschluss". Vasi Honismereti és Helytörténeti Közlemények (in Hungarian) (1993/2): 187.
