= Heinz Janisch =

Austrian writer (born 1960)

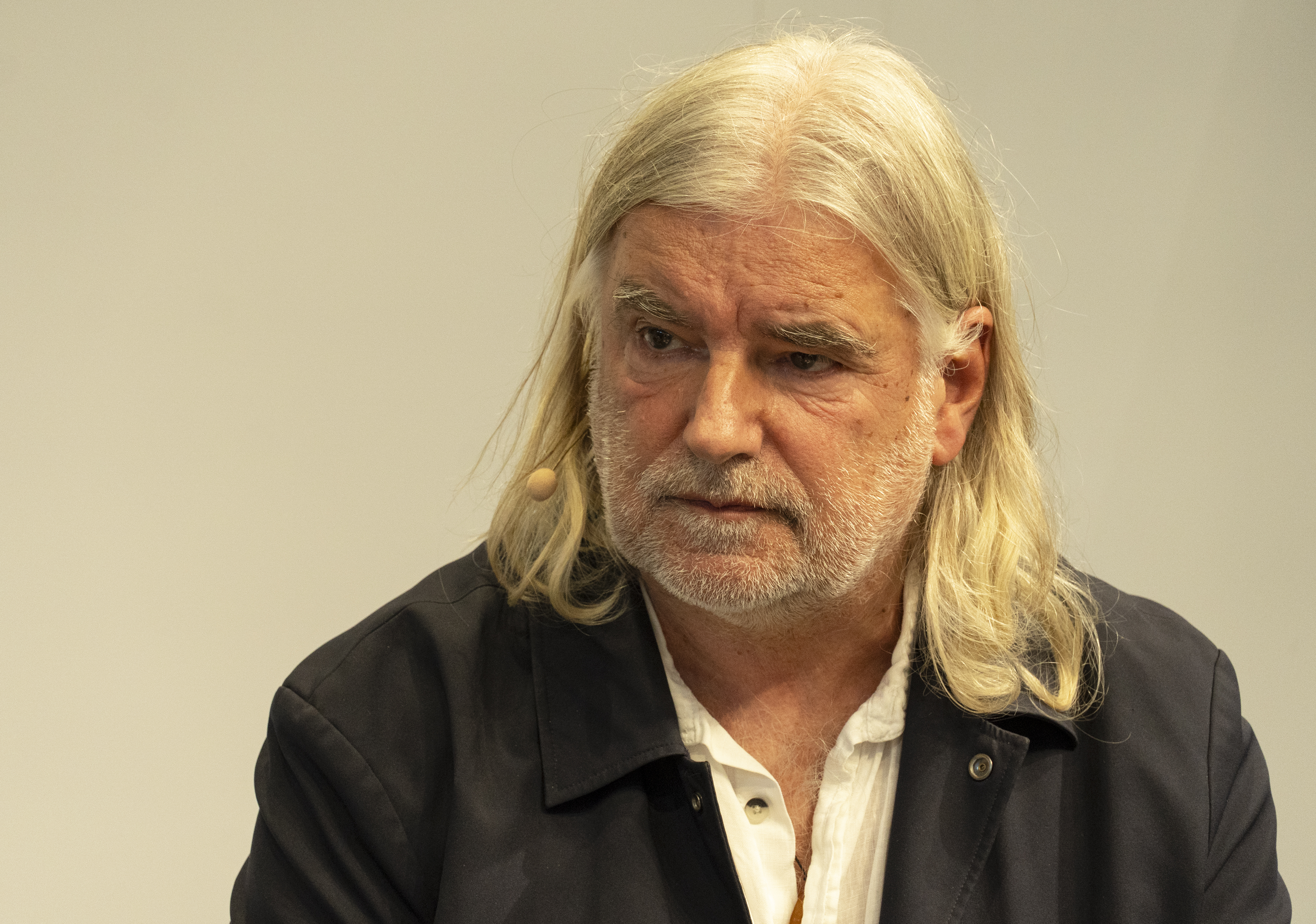
Janisch at the Frankfurt Book Fair 2025

Heinz Janisch is an Austrian radio journalist and writer. In 2024, he won the Hans Christian Andersen Award for Writing.

Janisch was born in 1960 in Güssing, Burgenland. He graduated from high school in 1978 and subsequently studied German philology at the University of Vienna. Since 1982, he has been working for Österreichischer Rundfunk.

Since 1989, Janisch has been writing. His works include children's books, for which he got multiple awards, poetry, as well as theater plays and dance pieces and film scripts. In particular, he won Kinderbuchpreis der Stadt Wien twelve times between 1995 and 2011, the Bologna Ragazzi Award in 2006, and the Austrian national children's literature award, Österreichischer Staatspreis für Kinder- und Jugendliteratur, five times between 2007 and 2012. In 2020, he received a lifetime achievement award, the Grosser Preis der Deutschen Akadamie für Kinder- und Jugendliteratur. In 2024, Janisch was awarded the Christine-Nöstlinger-Preis. Before winning the Hans Christian Andersen Award for Writing in 2024, he was nominated in 2022, but did not become a finalist.

Janisch resides in Vienna and in Burgenland.

== Works ==
=== Children's books ===
==== Picture books ====
- Mario, der Tagmaler. Illustrated by Leszek Wiśniewski. Neuer Breitschopf Verlag, Vienna 1989, ISBN 3-7004-0921-4.
- Gute Reise, Leo. Illustrated by Eugen Sopko. St. Gabriel Verlag, 1993, ISBN 3-85264-407-0.
- Ein Krokodil zuviel. Illustrated by Gabriele Kernke. Betz Verlag, 1994, ISBN 3-219-10578-5.
- Benni und die sieben Löwen. Illustrated by Gabriele Kernke. Betz Verlag, 1995, ISBN 3-219-10601-3.
- Sarah und der Wundervogel. Illustrated by Bernhard Oberdieck. Betz Verlag, 1996, ISBN 3-219-10644-7.
- Die Arche Noah. Illustrated by Lisbeth Zwerger. Neugebauer Verlag, 1997, ISBN 3-85195-076-3.
- Josef ist im Büro oder der Weg nach Bethlehem. Illustrated by Gabriele Kernke. Betz Verlag, 1998, ISBN 3-219-10756-7.
- Heut bin ich stark. Illustrated by Silke Brix-Henker. Betz Verlag, 2000, ISBN 3-219-10828-8.
- Es gibt so Tage... Illustrated by Helga Bansch. Jungbrunnen Verlag, 2001, ISBN 3-7026-5734-7.
- Wenn Anna Angst hat... Illustrated by Barbara Jung. Jungbrunnen Verlag, 2002, ISBN 3-7026-5737-1.
- Her mit den Prinzen! Illustrated by Birgit Antoni. Betz Verlag, 2002, ISBN 3-219-11011-8.
- Schenk mir Flügel. Illustrated by Selda Marlin Soganci. Np Buchverlag, 2003, ISBN 3-85326-275-9.
- Herr Jemineh hat Glück. Illustrated by Selda Marlin Soganci. Np Buchverlag, 2004, ISBN 3-85326-286-4.
- Ein ganz gewöhnlicher Montag. Illustrated by Sabine Wiemers. Betz Verlag, 2004, ISBN 978-3-219-11122-4.
- Der Prinz im Pyjama. Illustrated by Birgit Antoni. Betz Verlag, 2004, ISBN 3-219-11163-7.
- Bist du morgen auch noch da? Illustrated by Julia Kaergel. Gabriel Verlag, 2005, ISBN 978-3-522-30070-4.
- Rote Wangen. Illustrated by Aljoscha Blau. Aufbau Verlag, 2005, ISBN 978-3-351-04062-8.
- Ho ruck! Illustrated by Carola Holland. Betz Verlag, 2005, ISBN 978-3-219-11200-9
- Krone sucht König. Illustrated by Helga Bansch. Jungbrunnen Verlag, 2006, ISBN 978-3-7026-5776-5.
- Der Stärkste von allen! Illustrated by Daniela Bunge. Betz Verlag, 2006, ISBN 978-3-219-11268-9.
- Schatten. Illustrated by Artem. Bajazzo Verlag, 2007, ISBN 978-3-907588-80-2.
- Der Ritt auf dem Seepferd: Alte und durch wundersame Zufälle neu entdeckte Schriften über die unglaublichen Abenteuer des Carl Friedrich Hieronymus Freiherr von Münchhausen. Illustrated by Aljoscha Blau. Aufbau Verlag, 2007, ISBN 978-3-351-04074-1.
- Wenn ich nachts nicht schlafen kann. Illustrated by Helga Bansch. Jungbrunnen Verlag, 2007, ISBN 978-3-7026-5782-6.
- Ich hab ein kleines Problem, sagte der Bär. Illustrated by Silke Leffler. Betz, Munich 2007, ISBN 978-3-219-11089-0
- Der König und das Meer, 21 Kürzestgeschichten. Illustrated by Wolf Erlbruch. Sanssouci, Munich 2008, ISBN 978-3-8363-0118-3.
- Der Prinz mit der Trompete. Illustrated by Birgit Antoni. Annette Betz, 2011, ISBN 978-3-219-11487-4.
- Das bin ich. Ich zeig es dir. Illustrated by Birgit Antoni. Tyrolia, Innsbruck-Vienna 2014, ISBN 978-3-7022-3389-1.
- Der rote Mantel: Die Geschichte vom Heiligen Martin, Illustrated by Birgitta Heiskel, Tyrolia, Innsbruck 2016, ISBN 978-3-7022-3489-8.
- Till Eulenspiegel. Illustrated by Lisbeth Zwerger. Michael Neugebauer Verlag, Bargteheide 2016, ISBN 978-3-86566-343-6.
- Drei Könige. Illustrated by Birgitta Heiskel. Tyrolia, Innsbruck-Vienna, 2017, ISBN 978-3-7022-3641-0.
- Das Große Rennen. Illustrated by Gerhard Haderer. Jungbrunnen Verlag, Vienna, 2018, ISBN 978-3-7026-5921-9
- Wo bin ich? Illustrated by Isabel Pin. Tyrolia, Innsbruck-Vienna, 2019, ISBN 978-3-7022-3796-7.
- Jaguar, Zebra, Nerz. Illustrated by Michael Roher. Tyrolia, Innsbruck-Vienna, 2020, ISBN 978-3-7022-3869-8.
- Das kann ich. Ich zeig es dir. Illustrated by Birgit Antoni. Tyrolia, Innsbruck-Vienna, 2021, ISBN 978-3-7022-3953-4.
- Schneelöwe. Illustrated by Michael Roher. Tyrolia, Innsbruck-Vienna, 2022, ISBN 978-3-7022-4076-9.
- Das Geheimnis der Füchse. Ein Fall für Jaromir. Illustrated by Antje Dreschner, Obelisk Verlag, Innsbruck 2022, ISBN 978-3-99128-084-2.

==== Books ====
- Vollmond oder Benedikts Reise durch die Nacht. Neuer Breitschopf, Vienna / Stuttgart 1995, ISBN 978-3-7004-1248-9 (with CD).
- Der rote Pirat und andere Rucksackgeschichten. St. Gabriel Verlag, 1996, ISBN 3-85264-503-4.
- Grüner Schnee, roter Klee. Illustrated by Susanne Wechdorn. Jungbrunnen Verlag, 1997, ISBN 3-7026-5688-X.
- Der Sonntagsriese. Illustrated by Susanne Wechdorn. Jungbrunnen Verlag, 1998, ISBN 3-7026-5706-1.
- Ich schenk dir einen Ton aus meinem Saxofon. Illustrated by Linda Wolfsgruber. Jungbrunnen Verlag, 1999, ISBN 3-7026-5709-6.
- Die Reise zu den Fliegenden Inseln. Jungbrunnen Verlag, 2001, ISBN 3-7026-5731-2.
- Heute will ich langsam sein. Illustrated by Linda Wolfsgruber. Jungbrunnen Verlag, 2005, ISBN 978-3-7026-5769-7.
- Die kluge Katze: Die schönsten Tiermärchen aus aller Welt. Illustrated by Marion Goedelt. Betz Verlag, 2006, ISBN 978-3-219-11230-6.
- Nella und der Wind. Illustrated by Erwin Moravitz. edition lex liszt 12, Oberwart 2012, ISBN 978-3-99016-000-8.
- Wo kann ich das Glück suchen? Illustrated by Linda Wolfsgruber, Jungbrunnen, Vienna 2015, ISBN 978-3-7026-5875-5.
- Der Burgenlandfisch. Knaxi-Fisch-Buch 21. edition lex liszt 12, Oberwart 2018, ISBN 978-3-99016-141-8.
- Der Wilde Hornling. Knaxi-Fisch-Buch 22. edition lex liszt 12, Oberwart 2018, ISBN 978-3-99016-142-5.
- Die zweite Arche, Illustrated by Hannes Binder, Zürich, Atlantis Verlag, 2019, ISBN 978-3-7152-0761-2.

=== Books ===
==== Fiction and poetry ====
- Vom Untergang der Sonne am frühen Morgen. Umbruch Verlag, 1989, ISBN 3-900602-07-7.
- Nach Lissabon. Illustrated by Erwin Moser. Bibliothek der Provinz, 1994, ISBN 3-85252-030-4.
- Schon nähert sich das Meer. Illustrated by Erwin Moser. Bibliothek der Provinz, 1994, ISBN 3-85252-042-8.
- Lobreden auf Dinge. Illustrated by Erwin Moser. Bibliothek der Provinz, 1994, ISBN 3-85252-027-4.
- Gesang um den Schlaf gefügig zu machen. Bibliothek der Provinz, 1999, ISBN 3-85252-296-X.
- Einfach du. Illustrated by Jutta Bauer. Sanssouci, Munich 2006, ISBN 978-3-7254-1424-6.
- Über die Liebe: Die schönsten Geschichten und Gedichte. Illustrated by Silke Leffler. Betz Verlag, 2006, ISBN 978-3-219-11275-7.
- Täglich Urlaub! Illustrated by Selda Marlin Soganci. Sanssouci, Munich 2007, ISBN 978-3-8363-0055-1.
- Ich ging in Schuhen aus Gras, Illustrated by Hannes Binder, Atlantis, Zurich 2013, ISBN 978-3-7152-0650-9.

=== As an editor ===
- Salbei & Brot: Gerüche der Kindheit. Austria Press Verlag, 1992, ISBN 3-85330-110-X.
- Morgennatz und Ringelstern: Gedichte von Christian Morgenstern und Joachim Ringelnatz. Illustrated by Christine Sormann, 2005, ISBN 978-3-219-11229-0.
