= Gusztáv Batthyány =

Hungarian nobleman

Gusztáv Batthyány-Strattman
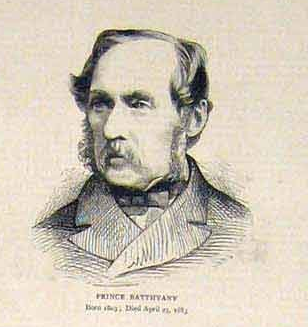
- Born: 8 December 1803; Pozsony
- Died: 25 April 1883 (aged 79); Vienna
- Spouse: Wilhelmine von Ahrenfeld

Gusztáv, 5th Prince Batthyány-Strattmann (8 December 1803 – 25 April 1883) was a Hungarian nobleman who bred horses in England where he was commonly known as Count Gustavus Batthyány.

== Biography ==
Batthyány was the son of Count Antal Batthyány de Németújvár and of his wife, Countess Mária Anna Festetics von Tolna. His family seat was Németújvár in western Hungary (now Güssing in Austria). The Batthyány family traces its roots as far back as the founding of Hungary by Árpád in the year 896, its ancestor being one of seven princes called Urs.

On 14 December 1828 Batthyány married Baroness Wilhelmine von Ahrenfeld, widow of Ferdinand, Graf Bubna von Littitz (died 1825), and some twelve years older than Batthyány. This came two years after the birth of their first son, Edmund, and two months after the birth of their second Gustav Emilian (1828-1906), but it had the effect of legitimating them both. His wife died in 1840.

In 1838 Batthyány donated his entire library, including the mysterious Rohonc Codex, to the Hungarian Academy of Sciences.

While still a young man Batthyány emigrated to England, where he became well known as an owner and breeder of Thoroughbred racehorses. In 1843 he established his own stud.

Batthyány was involved in the Magyar national movement as a member of the constitutional Hungarian Ministry of 1848 led by his cousin Lajos Batthyány. In 1851 he signed a letter together with his brother Count Kázmér Batthyány, Bertalan Szemere, and Prince Paul Esterházy to his old friends, the Duke of Wellington and Lord Melbourne, accusing Lajos Kossuth of high treason and terrorism. This letter exposed the divisions in the Magyar national movement to English supporters.

In 1859 Batthyány was elected to the Jockey Club. He hired the trainer John Dawson to condition his horses at Newmarket. In 1875 his horse Galopin won The Derby and went on to be the Leading sire in Great Britain and Ireland in 1888, 1889 and 1898. Galopin was the damsire of Bayardo and of the 1886 U.K. Triple Crown Champion, Flying Fox.

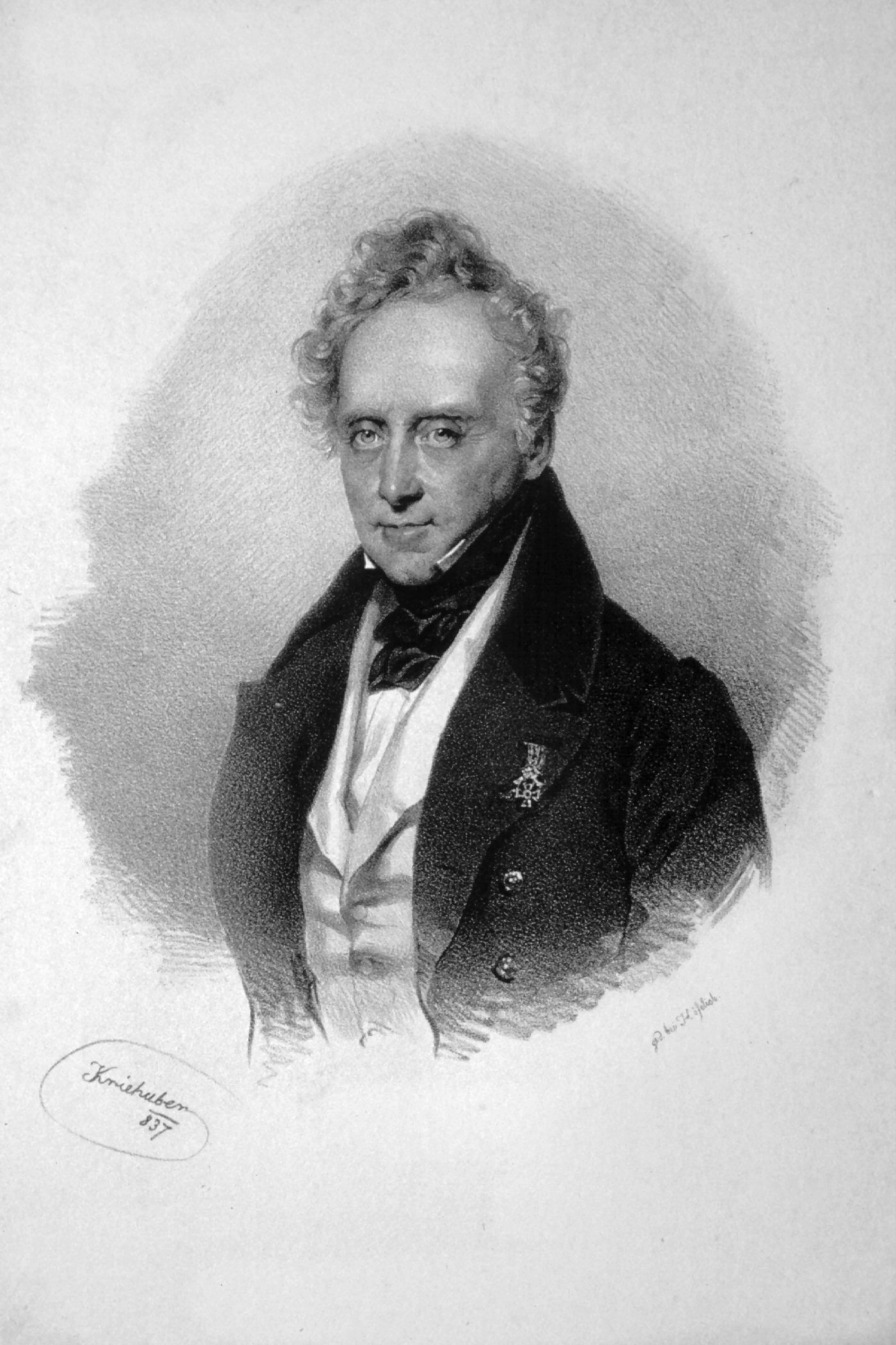
Philip, 4th Prince Batthyany-Strattmann (1781–1870)

In 1870 Batthyány's second cousin Philipp, 4th Prince Batthyány-Strattmann, died without children, and Batthyány succeeded as the 5th Prince Batthyány-Strattmann. At about this time he presented a small life-boat called Harbinger to the boatmen of Bridlington.

Batthyany had a heart condition that enforced the early retirement of his horse Galopin at the end of the 1875 season, as it was feared that the excitement of watching him race again could put the Prince's life at risk. He died on 25 April 1883 after suffering a heart attack while attending a luncheon at the Jockey Club. Probate was granted on 23 May 1883 to Annie Smith, wife of John Graham Smith, one of the Executors, in the amount of £49,612, 8s. His address at death was stated as 3 Park Street, Grosvenor Square. His executors sold off his bloodstock at the Tattersalls July Sale at Newmarket, and a legal action was brought against them by his eldest son.

== Marriage and family ==
On 14 December 1828 Batthyány married Freiin Wilhelmine von Ahrenfeld. They had two sons:

- Edmund Gustavus, 6th Prince Batthyány-Strattmann, born 20 November 1826, died on 29 October 1914 at the family castle of Körmend.
- Count Gustav Batthyány was born at Vienna on 3 September 1828 and died unmarried on 27 August 1906.

== Gallery ==
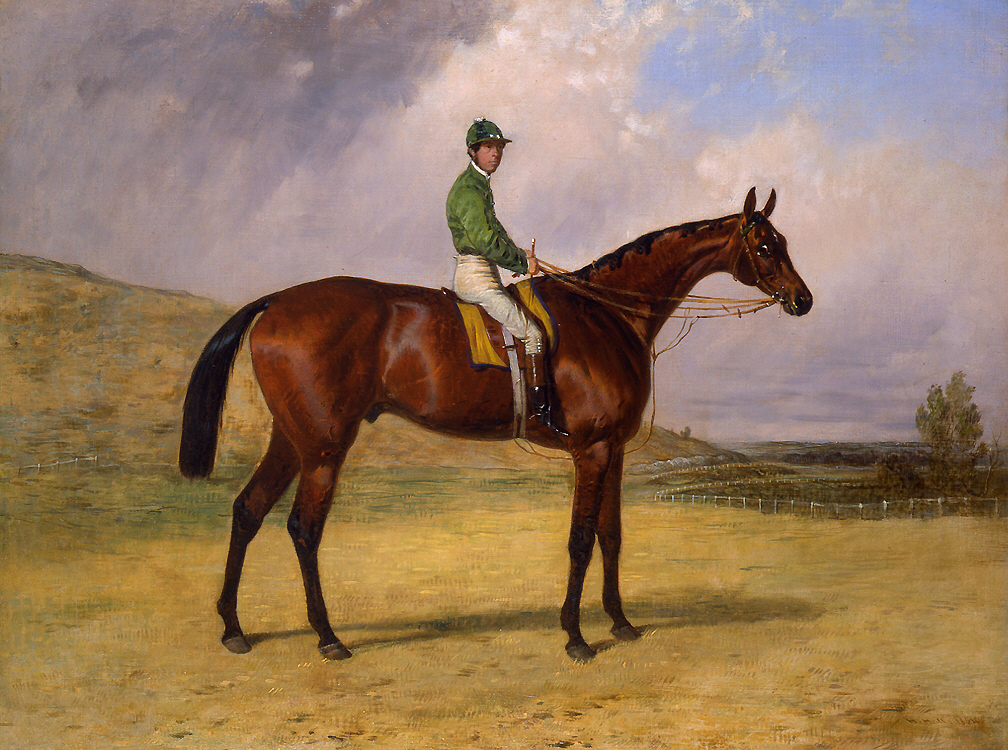
George Fordham in Batthyány's new colours on Prince Plausible (foaled 1858), painted by Harry Hall

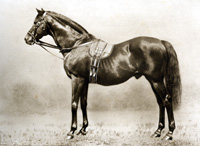
Galopin (1872–1899)

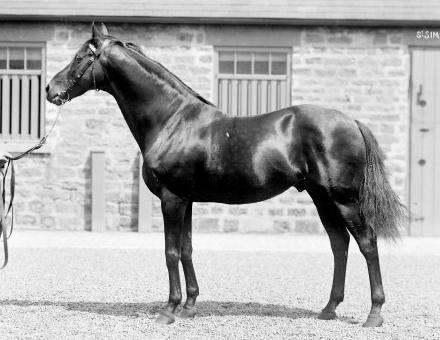
St. Simon (1881–1908)

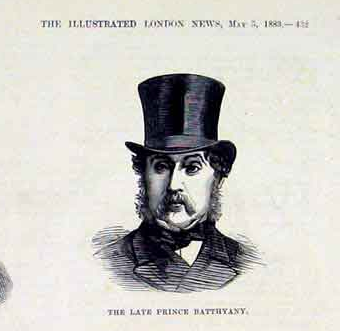
Batthyány in his later years
