= Dunakiliti =

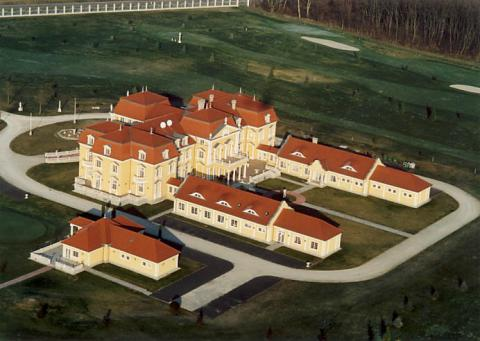
- Aerial photograph of Dunakiliti Palace

- Flag Coat of arms

- Location of Győr-Moson-Sopron county in Hungary

- Location of Dunakiliti
- Coordinates: 47.96513°N 17.28853°E
- Country: Hungary
- County: Győr-Moson-Sopron

Government
  - Type: Mayor–Council
  - Mayor: Mrs. Tamásné Andor Kovács (Independent politician)

Area
  - Total: 33.66 km^{2} (13.00 sq mi)

Population (2014)
  - Total: 1,862
  - Density: 53.47/km^{2} (138.5/sq mi)
- Time zone: UTC+1 (CET)
  - Summer (DST): UTC+2 (CEST)
- Postal code: 9225
- Area code: 96

Dunakiliti (German: Frauendorf, Croatian: Kliće) is a village in the Győr-Moson-Sopron county of Hungary.

== Location ==
Dunakiliti is a village in Győr-Moson-Sopron county, Hungary. It is in a region commonly referred to as the Little Hungarian Plain. It is located approximately seven kilometers from the Slovak border and 20 kilometers from the Austrian border. The Slovak capital of Bratislava is approximately 15 kilometers away from Dunakiliti as well.

== Population ==
According to the 2011 census, Dunakiliti's population was approximately 1,987, and has been growing for decades. The population has continued to increase partly because of a large number of commuters from Bratislava who buy or build their houses in Dunakiliti and go to Bratislava to work. Due to this, the village has a mostly Hungarian, and secondly Slovak population.

== History ==
A chapel in the village dates back to the year 1562, the same year the Dunakiliti Roman Catholic parish was formed. The mayor of Dunakiliti was Sándor Szokoli between 1985 and 2014. He was replaced by Andor Tamásné Kovács, a history and literature teacher at the village's primary school for 23 years and a council member for 12 years. On 27 June 2015 Dunakiliti celebrated its 850th birthday, citing records dating to 1165.

== Church ==
Dunakiliti is centered on its Roman Catholic church, which was built in 1910 in a Neo Gothic style. An older church was built in the same spot in 1735 in a Baroque style. Before the earlier church there was a small round singular room church in the same spot as well. On 1 March 1910 a base was added to the original church in a way that allowed it to stand while construction began on a newer one. A month later the church from 1735 was deconstructed. While breaking down the church several skeletons were found, causing many to believe that the church served as a cemetery in its first few years. On 25 September 1910 the first mass was celebrated in the new, but unfurnished, church. In 2010 the church celebrated its 100-year anniversary since its last major redesign. The village was given a grant to beautify the surrounding areas, in honor of the 100 year anniversary.

== Notable people ==
- Blessed László Batthyány-Strattmann
