= László Batthyány-Strattmann =

Hungarian aristocrat and physician

Blessed László Batthyány-Strattmann
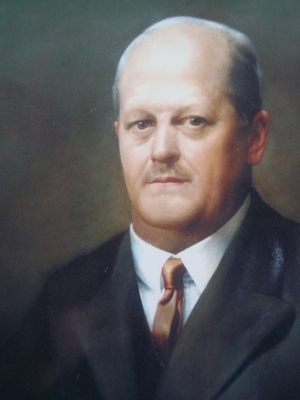

Physician
- Born: 28 October 1870; Dunakiliti, Austria-Hungary
- Died: 22 January 1931 (aged 60); Vienna, Austria
- Venerated in: Catholic Church
- Beatified: 23 March 2003, Vatican by Pope John Paul II
- Feast: 22 January

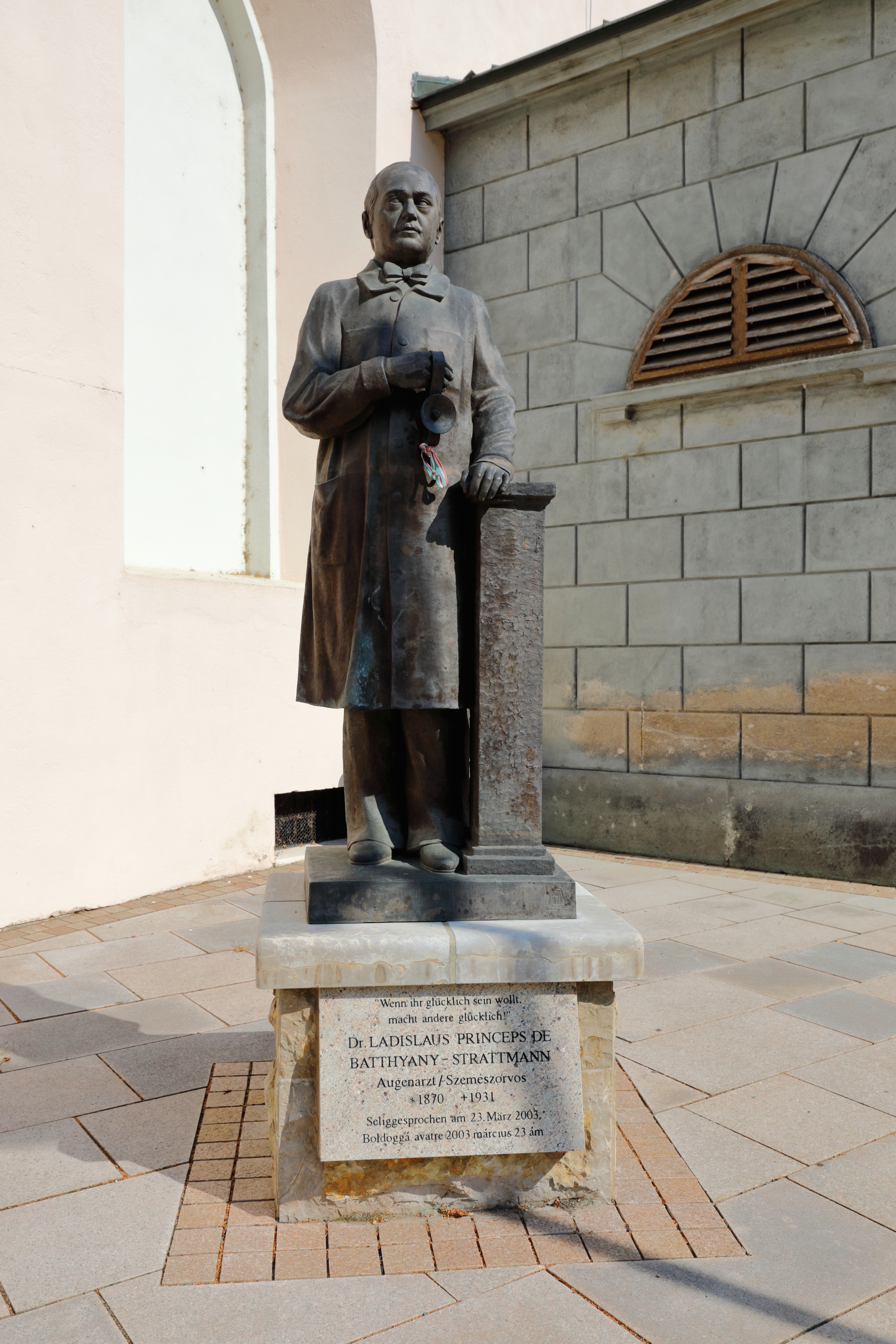
Batthyany-Strattmann memorial in Güssing

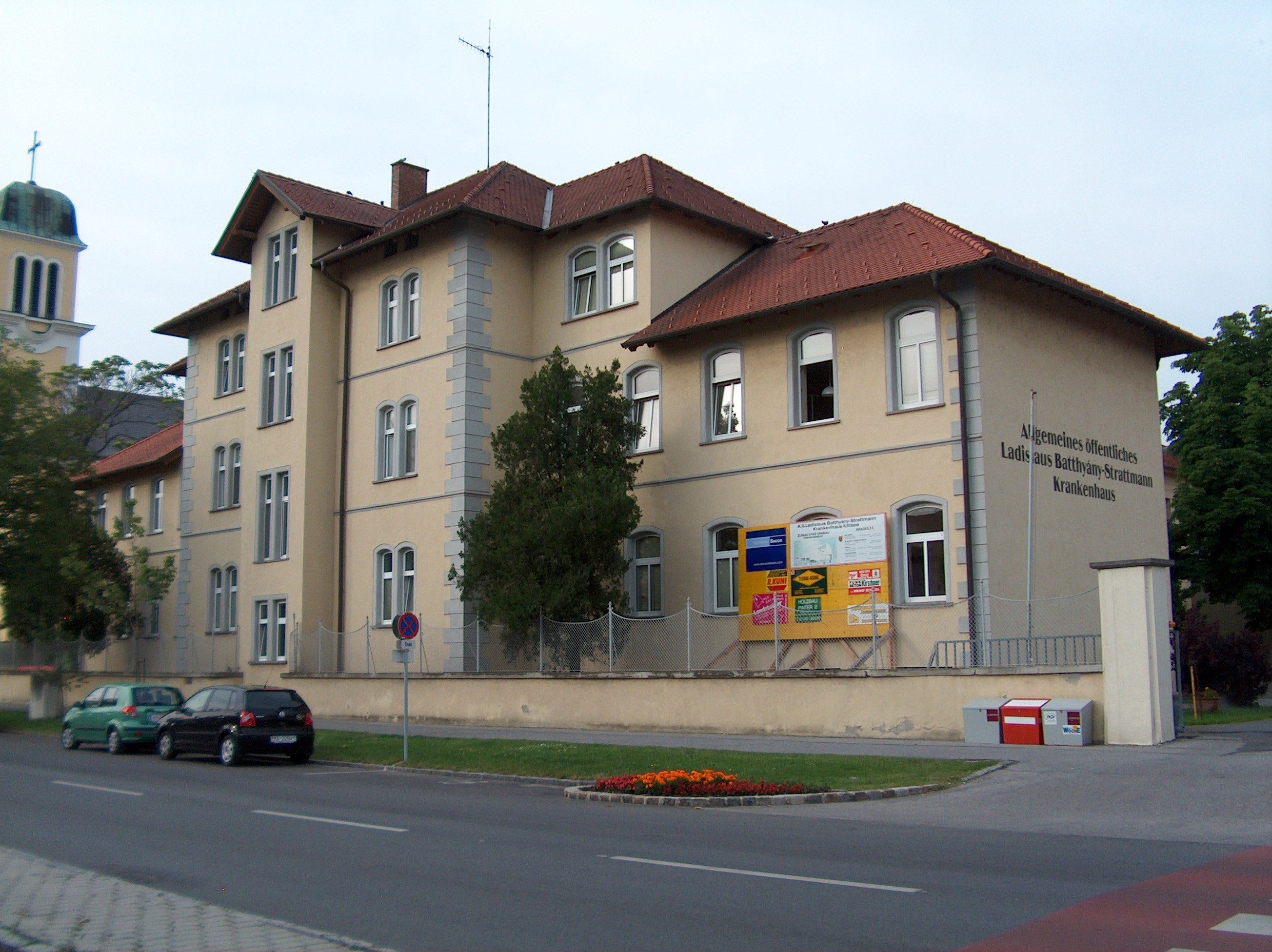
Hospital in Kittsee, Austria, named after Batthyány-Strattmann

László, 7th Prince Batthyany-Strattmann (German: Ladislaus Batthyány-Strattmann; 28 October 1870 – 22 January 1931) was a Hungarian aristocrat and physician. Until 1914, he was known as László Batthyány. A devout Catholic, he became known as the "doctor of the poor" and was beatified by the Church in 2003.

== Early life ==
László Batthyány-Strattmann was born on 28 October 1870, in Dunakiliti, Austria-Hungary, into an ancient Hungarian aristocratic family, the son of Count József Batthyány von Német-Ujvar (1836-1897) and his first wife and cousin, Countess Ludowika Batthyány von Német-Ujvar (1843-1882). The family moved to Austria in 1876. His childhood was marred by the fact that his father left his family and converted to Protestantism in order to marry another woman. After obtaining a divorce on 21 January 1879, his father married Countess Antonia Kornis de Gönczruszka (1835-1917). László first attended the grammar school run by the Jesuits in Kalksburg, before moving to Kalocsa. László's mother died when he was twelve years old.

He completed his secondary school studies in Uzhhorod. According to the will of his father, he first prepared himself to care for the vast property of the Batthyánys. He studied agriculture at the Economic Academy of Vienna, and later he studied a great number of other subjects, including chemistry, philosophy and music. In this chaotic period in his life, he also fathered an illegitimate daughter.

== Career and family ==
Batthyány became a student of medicine in 1896, and gained his degree of M.D. in 1900. He trained as a general practitioner, but soon specialized in surgery, and later in ophthalmology. This period was also accompanied by a renewal of his religious faith. He met Countess Maria Theresia von Coreth zu Coredo und Starkenberg (1874-1951), a devout Catholic, daughter of Count Karl Theodor von Coreth zu Coredo und Starkenberg (1837-1894) and his wife, Anna Bogdanovna Pankratieva (1849-1912), member of the Russian nobility and niece of Nikita Pankratiev. They married in Vienna on 10 November 1898. The couple had thirteen children 3 of which were boys and the other 10 were daughters. His wife organized the family's daily life, the children's education, and helped her husband in the hospital. A great trial was the death of his first-born son, Ödön, who died as a result of late-diagnosed appendicitis.

His father gave him a castle in Kittsee, Austria. In 1902 Batthyány opened a private hospital with twenty-five beds next to it, where he worked as a general practitioner, later specializing as a surgeon and oculist. Hungary's first modernly equipped twenty-four-bed rural hospital soon became so busy that MÁV started a special train to the small village in western Hungary. Pharmacists and opticians redeemed his prescriptions and prescribed glasses for free, as Doctor László settled the bill in one sum at the end of each month. During the First World War, the hospital was enlarged to take in wounded soldiers for treatment.

In 1915, Batthyány and his family moved to the castle of Körmend in Hungary, which he had inherited upon the death of his kinsman Prince Edmund of Batthyany-Strattmann in 1914; he also inherited the title of Prince (German Fürst, Hungarian herceg) and adopted the additional surname of "Strattmann". At Körmend he continued to practise as a doctor, becoming known for treating poor patients for no payment, which gained him the title of "doctor of the poor". Batthyány turned a wing of the castle into a hospital for ophthalmological patients and equipped it with state-of-the-art medical equipment. He financed the salary of the hospital staff from his own funds.

From 1907 till his death, László Batthyány prayed the Little Office of the Blessed Virgin Mary in Latin every day, and the rosary in the evening. In 1916, he and his wife joined the Franciscan Third Order.

== Death ==
At the age of 60, Batthyány was diagnosed with cancer of the bladder and admitted to the Löw sanatorium in Vienna, Austria. After fourteen months of illness, he died in January 1931. His body lay in state in the chapel of the castle at Kormend. He was buried in the family vault in the crypt of the Franciscan monastery at Güssing.

== Veneration ==
The beatification process was begun in 1944 as a joint effort of the Archbishop of Vienna (Austria) and the bishop of Szombathely (Hungary). The process was interrupted for a time due to the political situation of the following decades. It was taken up again in 1982 due to the initiative of the bishop of Eisenstadt (Austria), Stefan László. On 11 July 1992 László Batthyány-Strattmann was declared a Venerable - a necessary step for beatification. He was beatified on 23 March 2003 by Pope John Paul II.

The Franciscan monastery at Güssing has a shrine depicting the beatification of László Batthyány-Strattmann.

On 23 March 2008, the fifth anniversary of his beatification, the Dr. Ladislaus Batthyány-Strattmann confraternity of prayer for the canonization of the poor's doctor was invested by the archbishop of Vienna Christoph Cardinal Schönborn as a private association, being entitled under the justification of canon law.

The hospital in Kormend is named for him.
