= Körmend =

Town in Vas, Hungary

- Town
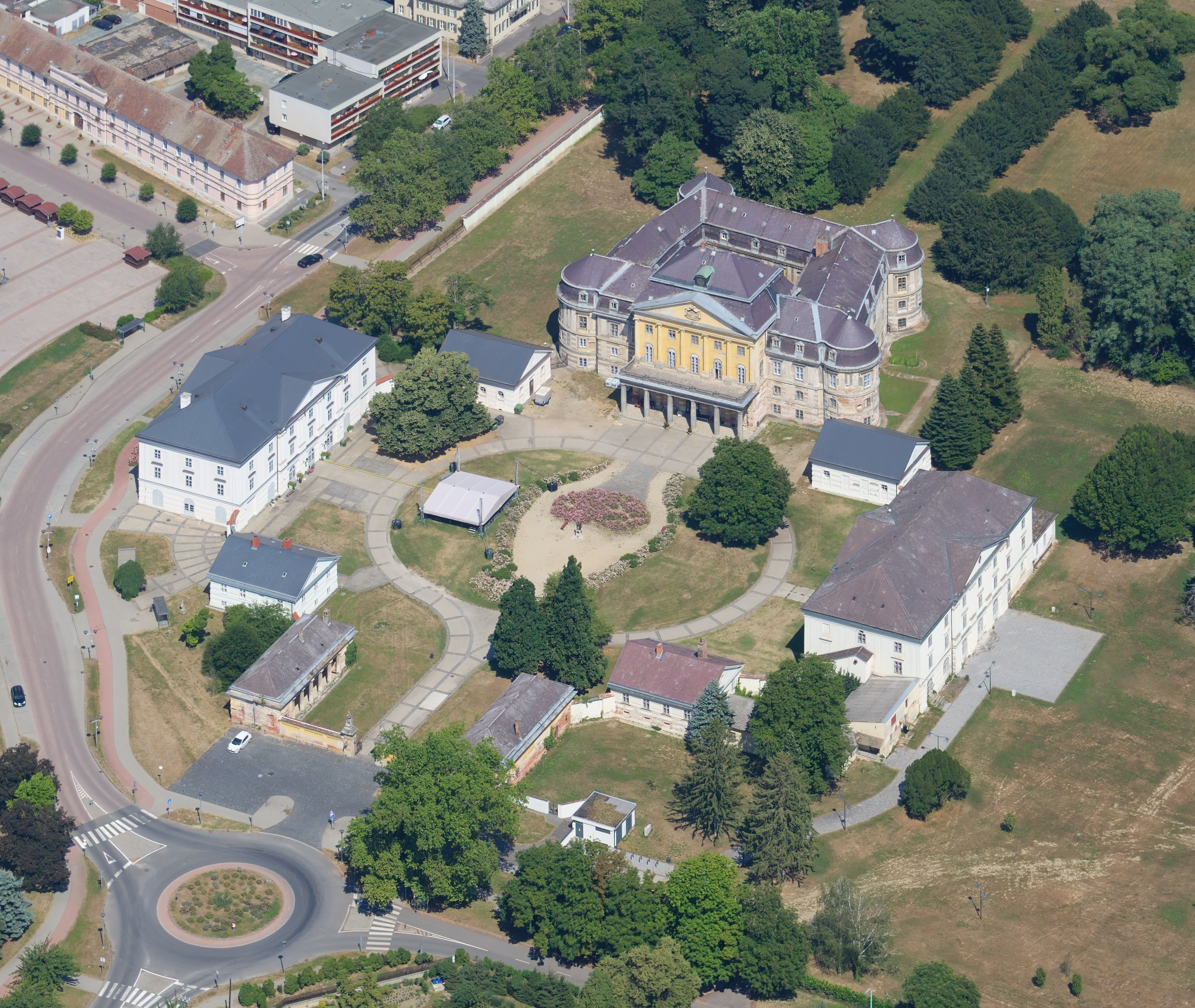
- Aerial view of the palace

- Flag Coat of arms

- Location of Körmend
- Coordinates: 47.01098°N 16.60575°E
- Country: Hungary
- County: Vas
- District: Körmend

Area
  - Total: 52.79 km^{2} (20.38 sq mi)

Population (2005)
  - Total: 12,379
  - Density: 234.5/km^{2} (607.3/sq mi)
- Time zone: UTC+1 (CET)
  - Summer (DST): UTC+2 (CEST)
- Postal code: 9900
- Area code: (+36) 94
- Website: www.kormend.hu

Körmend (Slovene: Kermendin, Prekmurje Slovene: Karmadén, German: Kirment) is a town in Vas County, Western Hungary.

== Places of interest ==
The town is especially well known for its castle which used to belong to the Batthyány family, one of the most important aristocrat families of Hungary. Blessed Ladislaus Batthyány-Strattmann (1870–1931), a famous ophthalmologist who was beatified by the Catholic Church, lived in the castle with his family for nearly 10 years. He turned one of the wings of the castle into an ophthalmology clinic where he treated poor patients for free.

Today, the castle belongs to the Hungarian state.

== Sport ==
- Körmendi FC, association football club
- BC Körmend, basketball club

== Notable people ==
- Prince Edmund Batthyany-Strattmann (1826–1914), nobleman
- László Batthyány-Strattmann (1870–1931), doctor and nobleman
- Sándor Bejczy (1920–2004), politician
- Imre Sinkovits (1928–2001), actor of the National Theatre
- Péter Besenyei (born 1956), aerobatic pilot
- Soulwave (formed 2007), alternative rock band
- Krisztián Pars (born 1982), hammer thrower
- Antal Rogán (born 1972), economist and politician

== Twin towns – sister cities ==
Körmend is twinned with:

- Heinävesi, Finland
- Fürstenfeld, Austria
- Kranenburg, Germany
- Rožnov pod Radhoštěm, Czech Republic
- Pivdenne, Ukraine
