= Edmund Batthyány-Strattmann =

Hungarian prince, landowner and yachtsman

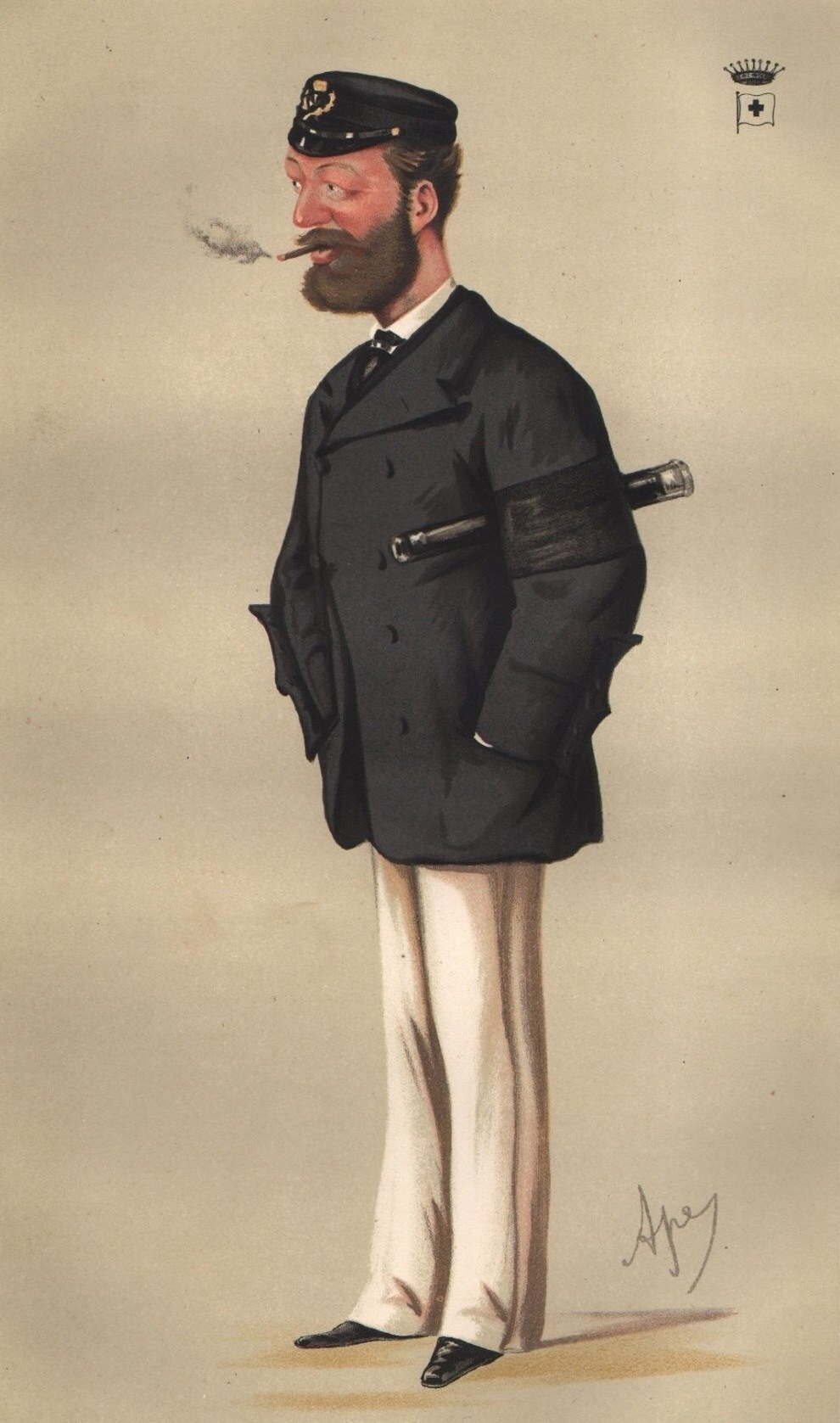
Count Edmund Batthyany by "Ape", 1874

Edmund Gustavus, 6th Prince of Batthyany-Strattmann (20 November 1826 – 29 October 1914), usually known in English as Count Batthyany, was a Hungarian prince, landowner, and yachtsman, a notable figure in Europe and the United States. His names and titles were given in different forms and translations, such as Batthyány Ödön in Hungarian and Edmond Gustave, Prince Batthyany, Comte de Strattmann, in French.

As well as being a prince and count of the Holy Roman Empire, he was also a hereditary member of the Hungarian House of Lords, a Ban of Croatia, and Lord Lieutenant of the County of Vas, or Eisenburg.

== Life ==
Batthyany was the son of Prince Gustavus Batthyany-Strattmann, a Hungarian nobleman who chose to live most of his life in England, and of his wife, Countess Wilhelmine von Bubna von Littitz née Baroness von Ahrenfeld (1791–1840), widow of Field Marshal Count Ferdinand Bubna von Littitz (1768-1825). His parents were married on 14 December 1828, two years after his birth, and this had the effect of legitimating him and his younger brother, Gustavus Batthyány von Német-Ujvar (1828–1906). His parents moved to England with their two young sons, and in 1838 his father was naturalised in Great Britain by an Act of Parliament and after that remained domiciled in England, becoming well known as an owner and breeder of race-horses. He won many races, including the Epsom Derby of 1875 with Galopin. Gustavus Batthyany's wife died at Richmond, Surrey, in 1840.

The young Edmund Batthyany was educated at Eton, where he was a wet bob. Soon after leaving school, he took up the sport of yachting, and with a yacht called Flying Cloud he won almost every race he entered. By the 1860s he was attempting to introduce the sport to his fellow Hungarians and along with a company of fellow Hungarian noblemen established the first yacht club in the country. In 1867 Hunt's Yachting Magazine described him as "a nobleman who has justly earned amongst us the name of a thoroughly practical and enthusiastic yachtsman". In 1874, the magazine Vanity Fair published a cartoon of Batthyany by "Ape" entitled "Yachting", reporting that from his youth he had been trained as an Englishman and that in pursuing his passion he had almost always owned the best vessel of the class he wished to race in. He was a member of the Royal Yacht Squadron, where in addition to sailing the garden parties he held at Eaglehurst House were very popular amongst those fortunate enough to be invited, featuring entertainments such as fire-balloons and a game of polo, played with hobby-horses.

In 1870 Philip, 4th Prince Batthyány-Strattmann, a second cousin of Batthyany's father, died without a son, and Gustav Batthyány succeeded him as Prince and also inherited some family land in Hungary and Austria, including the lordship of Güssing, but the two cousins had hardly known each other, and the 4th Prince did not leave Gustav Batthyány his unsettled property. Nevertheless, when he died in 1883, the 5th Prince left substantial settled estates in Austria, Hungary, and Croatia, in which his son Edmund succeeded him. On behalf of himself and his father's creditors, Edmund Batthyany then began a legal action against the trustees and executrix of his father's will for control of his father's property in England, including the proceeds from the sale of valuable horses, which took some years to come to a final judgement.

== Marriages ==
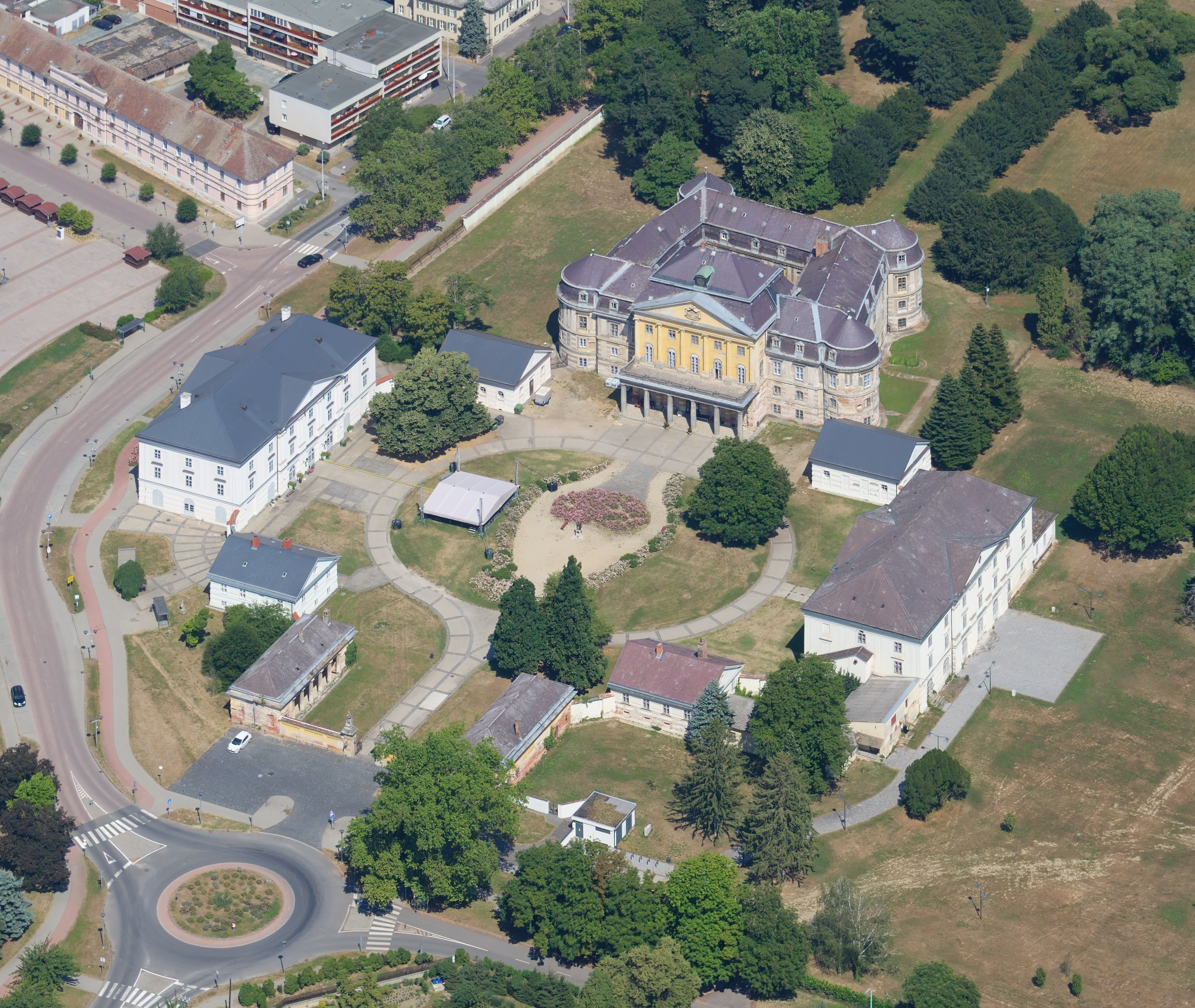
The family castle at Körmend, where Batthyany and his first wife both died

On 14 February 1857, at St James's Church, Piccadilly, Batthyany married Henrietta Mary Elisabeth Gumpel, a daughter of Gustavus Gumpel, a Jewish merchant originally from Hamburg who had emigrated to Manchester in 1814 after the defeat of Napoleon and the reversal of his emancipation of the Jews. They had no children. His wife became the owner of the Batthyany family estate at Rechnitz and died in 1893 at Körmend, a family castle in Hungary, aged 73. The Annual Register of World Events said of her in its obituary that she was "distinguished for great intellectual acquirements, and for her wide liberality to all in need."

Batthyany and his unmarried younger brother Gustavus were the last in the male line of Count Ludwig Batthyany (1696–1765). In 1902, the 75-year-old Batthyany married Amalie Holzmann, aged only 26, the daughter of a merchant, but this marriage was also childless. His brother died before him in 1906, and when Batthyany finally died at Körmend in October 1914 his heir was a distant kinsman, Dr László Batthyány, who inherited the castle at Körmend and began to live there, turning part of it into a hospital. Dr Batthyány was later beatified by Pope John Paul II.
