= Fiacre =

Fiacre may refer to:

- Fiacre (carriage), a horse-drawn carriage
- Fiacre (name)
- One of three Irish saints known as Saint Fiacre

== See also ==
- Saint-Fiacre (disambiguation), multiple places in France
