= Helas madam =

Folk song

"Helas madam" is a folk song widely attributed to Henry VIII, but which in reality appears in the Bayeux Manuscript, compiled during the final decades of the 15th century. The song is part of a secular collection, found on a manuscript that was used in Henry's court. The originality of the song has been questioned, with various parts of the song allegedly lifted from similar pieces in Europe. The song itself is a courtship conversation in Middle French between a man and woman.

== Lyrics ==
Middle French	Modern French	English
Helas madame, celle que j’ayme tant: Souffrez que soye vostre humble servant; Vostre humble servant je seray a toujours Et tant que je viv’ray aultr’ n’aymeray que vous. Hellas, beau sire, vous estez bel et bon, Sage et courtoys et de noble maison, Et aussi bon que l’on scairoit finer, Mais cil que j’ayme, ne scairoye oublier. Hellas, ma dame, pences en vostre cas: Entre nous deulx ne fault point d’avocatz. Certes non pas, et vous le scavez bien. Allez vous en, car vous ne faictez rien. Mon cueur souspire et se plaint tendrement, Quant il ne peult trouver allegement. Ne scay comment on me veult dechasser; S’il est ainsi, j’ayray ailleurs chasser. Hellas, ma dame, et n’en seray-je point? Certes beau sire, je ne le vous dis point. Servez a point: il vous sera mery. Hellas, ma dame, de bon cueur vous mercy.	Hélas ma dame, celle que j’aime tant: Souffrez que sois-je votre humble servant; Votre humble servant, je serai toujours Et tant que je vivrai, autre n’aimerai que vous. Hélas, beau sire, vous êtes bel et bon, Sage et courtois et de noble maison, Et aussi bon que l’on saurait trouver, Mais celui que j’aime, ne saurait oublier. Hélas, ma dame, pensez votre cas: Entre nous deux il ne faut point d’avocat. Certes non pas, et vous le savez bien. Allez-vous en, car vous ne faites rien. Mon coeur soupire et se plaint tendrement, Quant il ne peut trouver allègement. Ne sachant comment on me veut chasser; S’il est ainsi, j’irai ailleurs chasser. Hélas, ma dame, et n’en serai-je point? Certes beau sire, je ne le vous dis point. Comportez a point, et vous en serez récompensé. Hélas, ma dame, de tout mon cœur merci.	Alas my lady, whom I do so love: Suffer me to be your humble servant; Your humble servant I shall always be. And while I live, I'll love none else but you. Alas, fair sir, you are good and kind, Wise and courteous and from a noble house, And as good as one could find, But I can't forget the one I love. Alas my lady, think upon your case: Between us two, no need for advocate. Certainly not, and you know it well. Be gone, for you are doing nothing. My heart sighs and tenderly complains, When it cannot find relief. I know not how it wants me to woo; If it is so, I'll go wooing elsewhere. Alas my lady, and shall I not? Certainly, fair sir, I have not said so. Behave rightly and you will be rewarded. Alas my lady, from my whole heart, thank you.
