= Syra of Troyes =

Irish Christian nun

Saint Syra
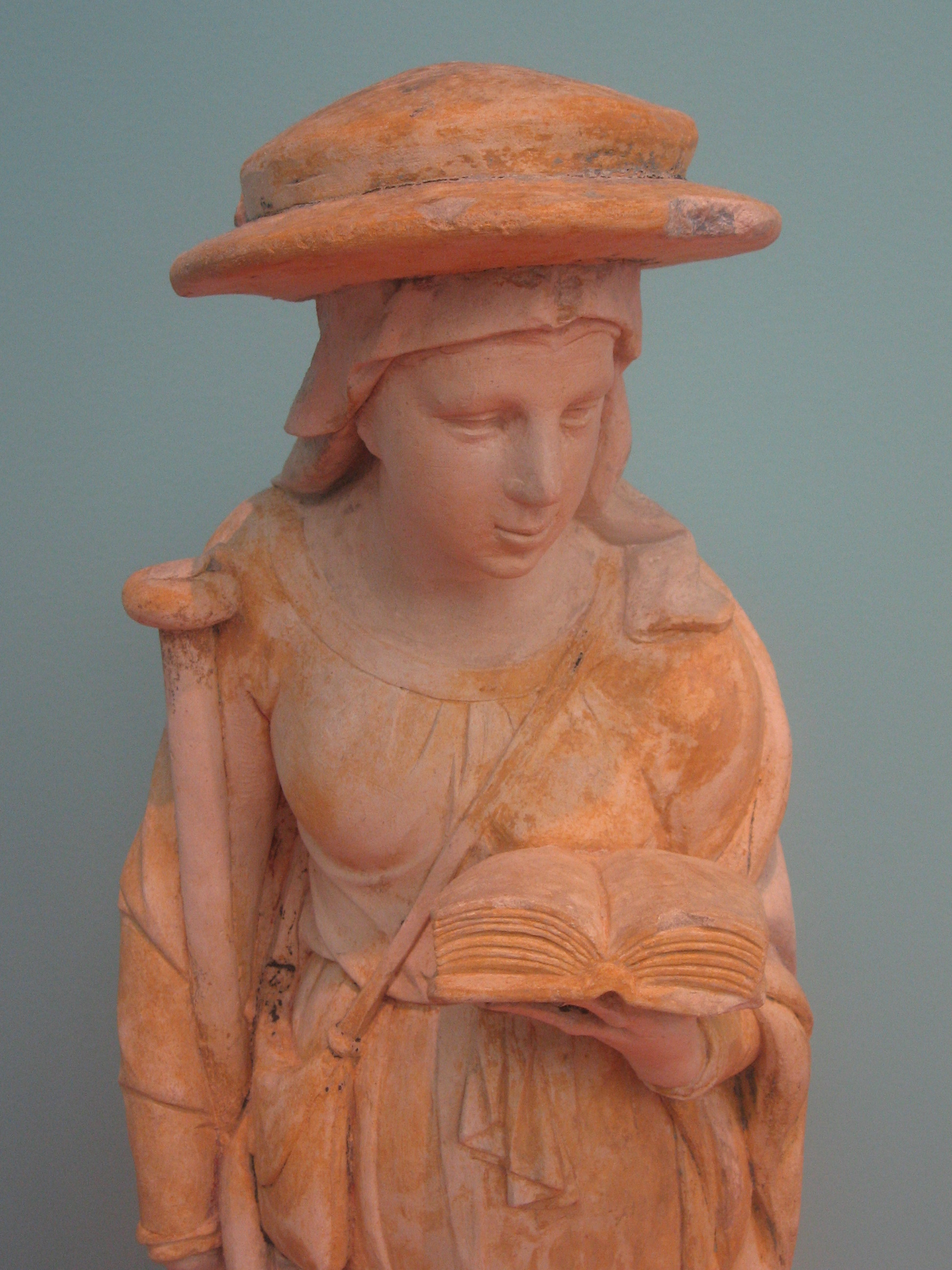
- Saint Syre of Troyes
- Born: Ireland
- Died: 7th-century Meaux, France
- Canonized: Pre-congregation
- Feast: 8 June (Troyes); 23 October (Meaux)

Saint Syra of Troyes (or Syre; died c. 640) was an Irish woman, sister of Saint Fiacre, who became a nun in France and died in Meaux but came to be venerated in Troyes. Her story has been conflated with that of a woman named Syria who died in Troyes in the 4th or 5th century. Her feast day is 8 June.

== Monks of Ramsgate account ==
The monks of St Augustine's Abbey, Ramsgate wrote in their Book of Saints (1921),

Syra (St.) V. (June 8)
(7th cent.) A sister of Saint Fiaker (Fiacre), who followed her brother from Ireland to France, and there lived a saintly life as a nun.

== Butler's account ==
The hagiographer Alban Butler (1710–1773) wrote in his Lives of the Fathers, Martyrs, and Other Principal Saints under June 8,

St. Syra, V.

SHE was sister to St. Fiacre, fired by whose example she left all to follow Christ. To make this sacrifice more entire she sailed from Ireland, her native country, and going after her brother into France, addressed herself to his patron and protector, St. Faro, bishop of Meaux. That holy prelate recommended her to his sister Farra, abbess in Brie. Syra, under so eminent a directress, became a perfect pattern of humility, meekness, charity, and devotion. From her cell she was translated into paradise in the seventh century, and is honoured at Troyes and in some parts of Ireland on the eight of June; and at Meaux on the twenty-third of October. See Saussaye, and Colgan in MSS.

Butler also wrote under August 30 in his life of St Fiaker, called by the French Fiacre,

St Fiaker had a sister called Syra, who died in the diocese of Meaux, and is honoured there among the holy virgins. Dempster, Leland, Tanner, and others, mention a letter of spiritual advice which St Fiaker wrote to her. She ought not to be confounded with St Syra of Troyes, who was a married woman, and lived in the third century. See Du Plessis, Note 30. T.1, p.684.

== O'Hanlon's account ==
John O'Hanlon (1821–1905) in his Lives of the Irish saints under June 8, notes that two distinct saints are honored on 8 June, Saints Syra and Syria, and their stories have been confused. St. Syria was a matron at Troyes in the fourth of fifth century. The Acts of St. Sabinian, Martyr, say that Syria of Troyes was a matron who had been blind for many years and received her sight at the tomb of Sabinien. She is venerated in Troyes on 8 June. The Bollandists consider that St. Syra, sister of Fiacre, should properly by venerated on 23 October. O'Hanlon continues,

St. Syra is said to have been St. Fiacre's sister, and if so she was of distinguished family. Another account has it, that she was daughter to Eugene IV., and of the royal family of Scotland, and that her father took great care to have her brought up virtuously and imbued with sentiments of Christian piety. From a very tender age, she manifested the results of such training. It is stated, that St. Conon, Bishop of Lodore, was selected to be her teacher; while to knowledge and prudence, he joined wisdom and piety. From her earliest years, Syra conceived an ardent love for our Lord Jesus Christ, and she passed several hours on her knees, in fervent prayer. She therefore resolved to have no other spouse but Him alone, and she rejected those offers of marriage, preferred by many highly distinguished suitors. The Legend of her Acts declares, that to resist their solicitations, she obtained through prayer the favour to her of becoming blind. However, she had some internal revelation, that in France she should be restored to the use of her sight.

She was resolved to imitate her brother's example, by leaving her friends and native country. Owing to this detachment from the fondest earthly ties, she hoped the better to arrive at Christian perfection. Syra selected some female companions to accompany her. She then left her native country, and she resolved on seeking her brother in France. Aided by her guardian Angel, she succeeded in finding the place of his retreat. The holy man received St. Syra and her associates joyfully, while he exhorted them to the practice of all virtues, and especially to guard that of virginity. St. Syra addressed herself to St. Faro, Bishop of Meaux, patron and protector of her brother. He had established various religious 'houses in his diocese, during the somewhat extended period of his episcopacy. The holy prelate recommended her to his sister St. Fara, who was Abbess in Brie, or Brige, from the Celtic word, which it is said signifies "a bridge." It was otherwise called Jouarre. This holy Abbess is also called Burgundofara, while from her this celebrated foundation received the denomination Faremoutier, as also an adjoining forest. The virtues of this holy woman are celebrated by the illustrious Bossuet, as also those of her holy brother, in a style of eloquence peculiar to that great writer and orator.

St. Syra became a perfect pattern of humility, charity, meekness and devotion, under such a directress. At Troyes, the holy Martyr St. Savinien had been held in great veneration. But hostile incursions had caused such disorders and ravages in the place, that the exact site of his tomb was then unknown. Through his merits, St. Fiacre had an inspiration, that his sister should recover her sight, while to her in like manner was revealed the spot where the body of St. Savinien lay. There, prostrating herself, she poured forth her soul in prayer, and her face bedewed with tears, she would not rise from the ground until her petition was heard. She was restored miraculously to the use of vision. Then, to manifest her gratitude to the holy Martyr, she formed a resolution of there fixing her abode. She caused a cell and a chapel to be built, so that her gratitude should remain lasting and tangible. There she spent whole days and nights in prayer, while some of those virgins, who accompanied her from Scotia, shared in her pious exercises.

From this place, she occasionally visited Chalons, and she withdrew often to the pious virgins of the community of Sainte-Pome.as She communicated to them that Divine fire of love, with which her heart was filled, repeating often these beautiful words : " Oh! vile, despicable and infected is earth to me, when I look upon Heaven Vanity of vanities and all is vanity, except to serve God, and to love Him only!" The reputation of Syra's great sanctity soon spread through all the surrounding country. A request was made to her, that she would quit her cell to visit a community of women, which had relaxed religious fervour, in order that again she might restore it. Through humility, not conceiving herself called to become a religious reformer, and doubting her powers of persuasion, she hesitated for a long time. However, to promote God's greater glory in the salvation of souls, she accepted the mission, at last, and she laboured zealously to effect the desired change. She succeeded, in an admirable manner, not less to her own astonishment, than to that of others, who knew the disagreeable nature of her task. Having thus restored order in that community, she returned to her little cell, near the tomb of St. Savinien. There she buried herself in exercises of penitence to the end of her days. The Almighty, willing to crown St. Syra, soon called her away from this life. She departed on the 8th of June, sometime in the seventh century.

It is said, by some writers, the year of her departure was 640; according to Dempster, it was A.D. 643. Her body was buried, according to one statement, in the small chapel she had built, near the tomb of St. Savinien. It was deposited within a stone coffin. Another account has it, that she departed this life at or near Meaux, where her spiritual fathers, St. Fiacre and St. Faro, lived. A part of St. Syra's relics remain in the place, where she is said to have died, at Troyes. There, too, was built a small church, greatly frequented by pilgrims, while numberless miracles were wrought at her tomb. A part of her relics were transferred to Troyes. A long time after her death, during the episcopate of Jean d'Aubinac and Jean d'Auxey at Troyes, her remains were in a shrine of brass, adorned with chasings of silver, and with several small images. In the year 1300, Henri de Noa, dean of Troyes, established a rich foundation to celebrate annually, in the church at Troyes, the festival of St. Spa, with an Office of Nine Lessons. In the seventeenth century, her coffin was to be seen, in the little chapel consecrated to her memory.

The shrine of St. Syra was cast in the flames, on the 27th of March, 1794; but, it pleased the Almighty, to preserve the remains of His servant. Her relics were authenticated in 1826, and in 1835. Portions of St. Syra's remains are yet preserved in the Parishes of St. Martin-ès-Vignes, of Rilly-Sainte-Syre, of Chêne, and of Jully-le-Châtel. Irrespective of foreign testimonies, we do not know, that the present saint had been honoured in Ireland, at this date.

== Sources ==
- Butler, Alban (1799), The Lives of the Primitive Fathers, Martyrs, and Other Principal Saints, J. Moir This article incorporates text from this source, which is in the public domain.
- Butler, Alban (1823), The Lives of the Irish Saints, Extracted from the Writings of the Rev. Alban Butler, and Now Placed in Order, with a Prefixed Callender; to which is Added, an Office and Litany in Their Honour, with a Defence of the Monastic Institute. By a Cistercian Monk, J. Coyne This article incorporates text from this source, which is in the public domain.
- O'Hanlon, John (1875), Lives of the Irish saints, vol. 4, Dublin: James Duffy This article incorporates text from this source, which is in the public domain.
- St. Augustine's Abbey, Ramsgate (1921), The Book of saints : a dictionary of servants of God canonized by the Catholic Church, London: A. & C. Black, ltd. This article incorporates text from this source, which is in the public domain.
