= Saint-Fiacre =

Saint-Fiacre is the name or partial name of four communes in France.

- Saint-Fiacre, Côtes-d'Armor, in the Côtes-d'Armor département
- Saint-Fiacre, Seine-et-Marne, in the Seine-et-Marne département
- Saint-Fiacre-sur-Maine, in the Loire-Atlantique département
- Cuy-Saint-Fiacre in the Seine-Maritime département

== See also ==
- Fiacre
