= Rotunde =

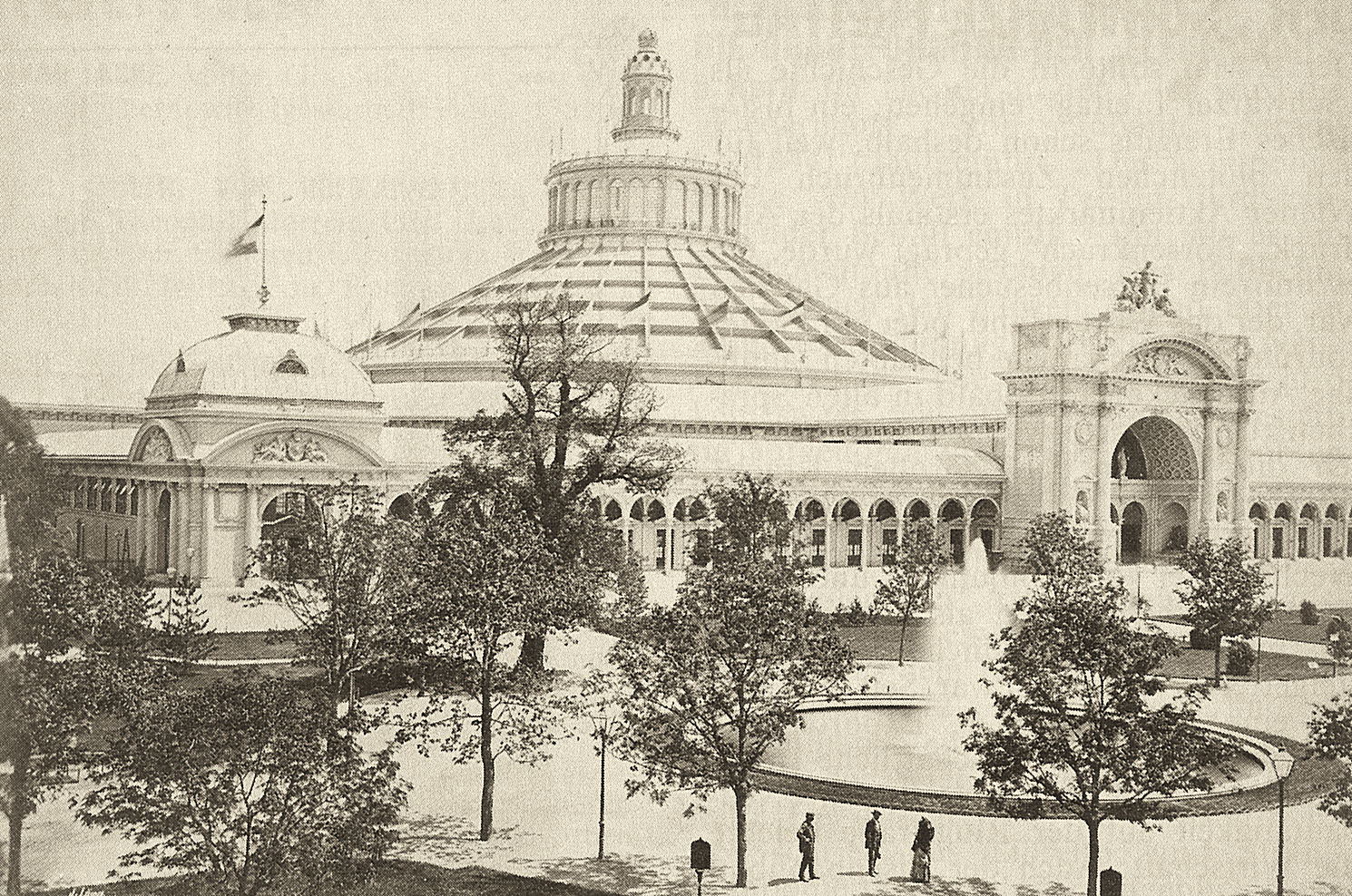
- The Rotunde in 1873

- Location within Vienna Rotunde (Austria)

General information
- Status: Destroyed by a fire in 1937
- Classification: Former building
- Location: Leopoldstadt, Vienna, Austria
- Coordinates: 48°12′44″N 16°24′34″E
- Completed: 1873

Dimensions
- Diameter: Of dome only: 107.83 m (353.8 ft) (outer); 101.7 m (334 ft) (inner)
- Circumference: Of dome only: 319.6 m (1,049 ft) (inner)

Design and construction
- Architect: Baron Karl von Hasenauer

The Rotunde (German: [roˈtʊndə]) in Vienna's Leopoldstadt district was a building erected for the 1873 Vienna World's Fair (German: Weltausstellung 1873 Wien). The building was a partially covered circular wrought iron construction, 84.1 m (276 ft) tall, with a diameter of 107.83 m (353.8 ft). (Note: "Accurately stated, the exterior diameter of the Rotunde is 107·83 meters, and its height 84·1 meters") While the Rotunde stood, its dome was the largest in the world, larger than the Pantheon in Rome. (Note: The Pantheon in Rome, which was dedicated c. 126 AD, over 1,700 years before the Rotunde was completed, has a dome that is 43.3 m (142 ft) in diameter).

The Rotunde burned down in 1937. Its former site is now occupied by buildings associated with the Vienna University of Economics and Business, and with Messe Wien.

== Construction ==
The Rotunde was designed by the Austrian architect Baron Karl von Hasenauer, and was built by the German entrepreneur and bridge builder Johann Caspar Harkort VI and his company based in Duisburg. The Scottish civil engineer John Scott Russell was responsible for the dome, which was built with wrought iron.

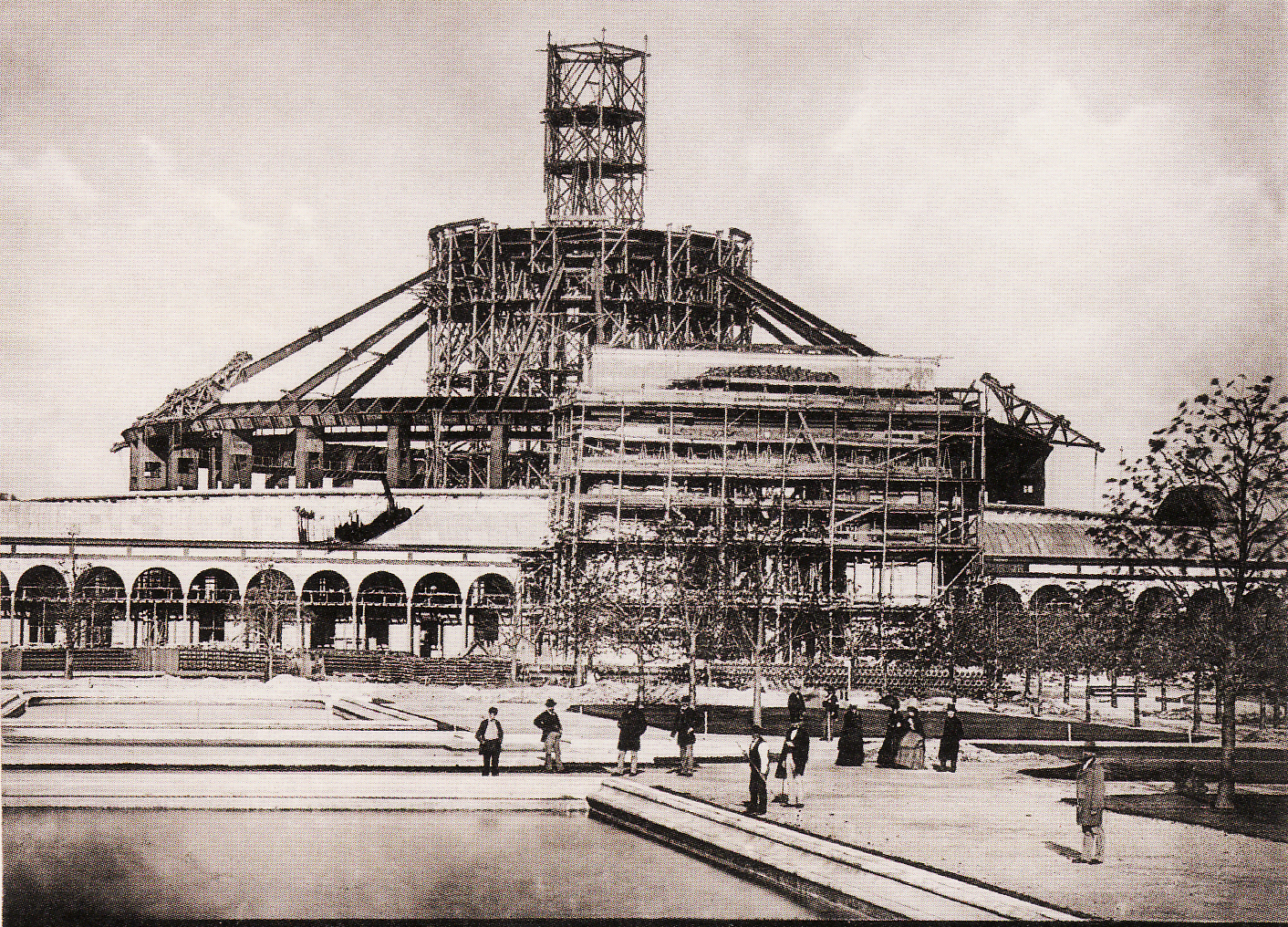
The Rotunde under construction in October 1872

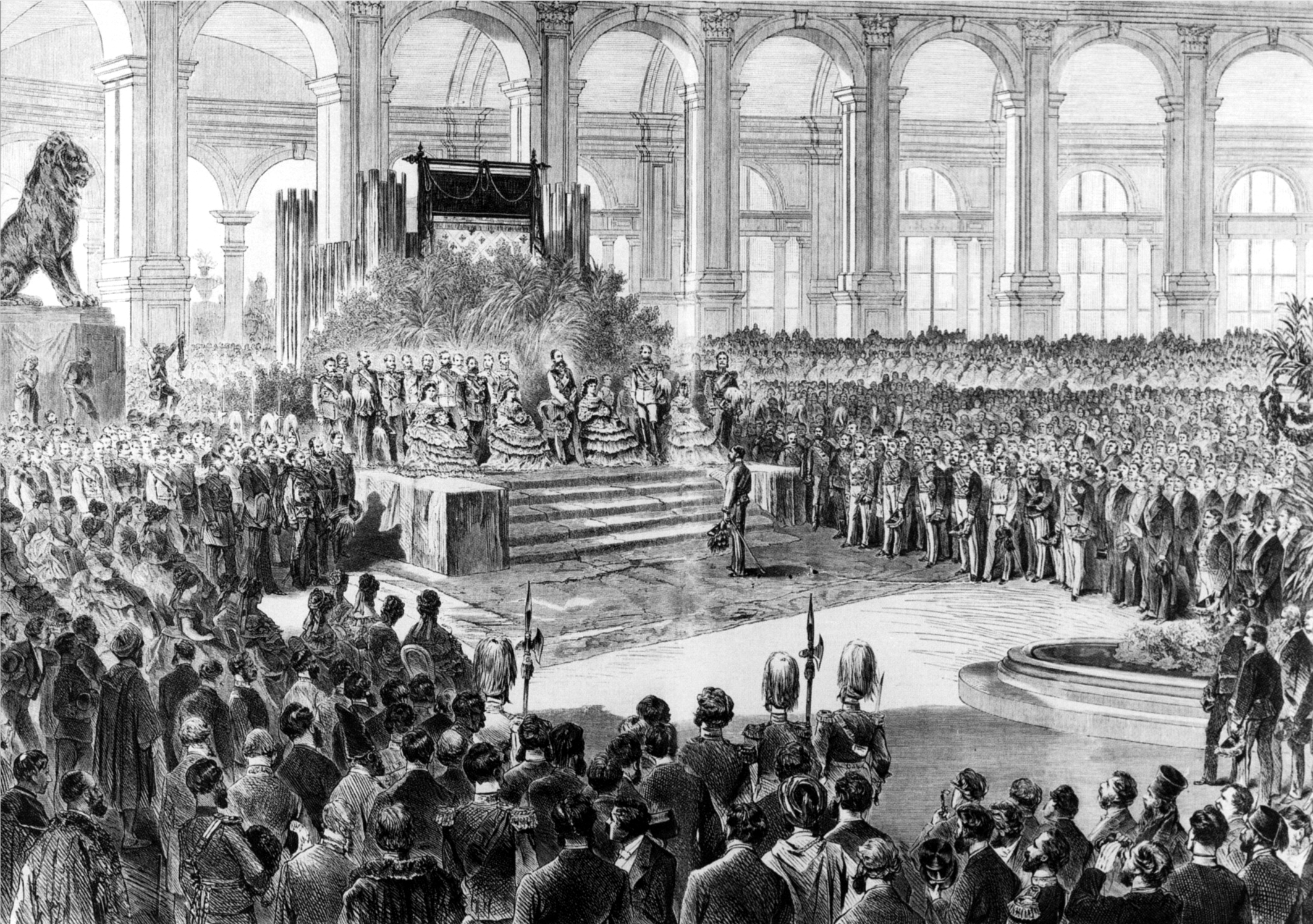
The opening of the 1873 Vienna World's Fair inside the Rotunde

The German engineer and journalist Wilhelm Heinrich Uhland reported, that the Rotunde weighed approximately "80,000 hundredweight (Zoll centner), or about 4000 tons", that is, 4,000,000 kg (8,800,000 lb). (Note: "The total weight of the structure of the Rotunde may be stated in round numbers at 80,000 hundredweight (Zoll centner), or about 4000 tons")

Conversions of the Rotunde's weight

A centner is a unit of mass equal to 100 of some base unit of mass. The German equivalent of the centner is the Zentner, and its base unit was traditionally the pound (German: Pfund), the definition of which varied in Germany. In 1854 the Zollpfund was defined by the German Customs Union (German: Zollverein) as being equal to 500 grams. The "Zoll[ ]zentner" or "Zoll[ ]centner" is a Zentner/centner with the Zollpfund as its base unit: the Zollzentner is equal to 100 Zollpfund.

Accordingly, the weight of the Rotunde reported by Uhland can be converted into metric units:

$80,000\ \text{Zollzentner}\cdot\frac{100\ \text{Zollpfund}}{1\ \text{Zollzentner}} = 8,000,000\ \text{Zollpfund}$

$8,000,000\ \text{Zollpfund}\cdot\frac{500\ \text{g}}{1\ \text{Zollpfund}} = 4,000,000,000\ \text{g}$

$4,000,000,000\ \text{g}\cdot\frac{1\ \text{kg}}{1000\ \text{g}} = 4,000,000\ \text{kg}$

$4,000,000\ \text{kg}\cdot\frac{1\ \text{t}}{1000\ \text{kg}} = 4,000\ \text{t}$

So, by "4000 tons", Uhland presumably meant 4,000 tonnes/metric tons (SI symbol t), not short or long tons.

The central building of the World's Fair was accepted enthusiastically by the public. After the World's Fair, the Rotunde was used for shows and fairs.

== Fiakerlied ==
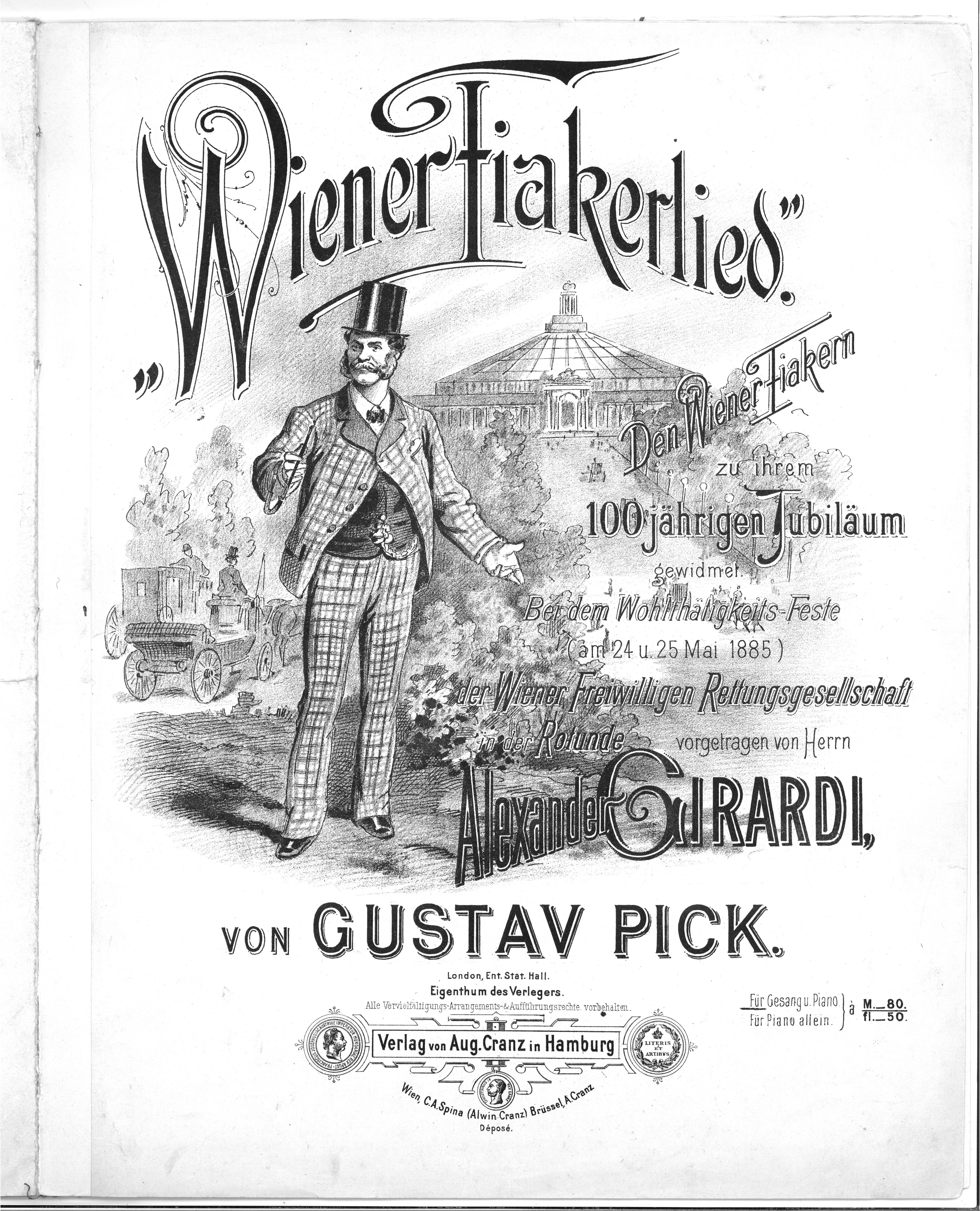
Sheet music cover art of Girardi's 1885 performance in the Rotunde

Alexander Girardi performed in the Rotunde on 24–25 May 1885, singing Gustav Pick's new composition, the Fiakerlied, for the first time.

== Jubilee Exhibition 1898 ==
In 1898, Emperor Franz Joseph's Jubilee Exhibition (Jubiläumsausstellung) was held in the Rotunde. The "Collective Exhibition of Austrian Automobile Builders" (German: Collektivausstellung österreichischer Automobilbauer), organized by the Austrian Automobile Club (German: Österreichische Automobil-Club), was held as part of the Jubilee Exhibition. Four automobiles from manufacturers in Austria-Hungary were shown: the automobile built by Siegfried Marcus in 1888–1889 (the first automobile built in Austria-Hungary), an Egger-Lohner electric automobile, an Egger-Lohner petrol automobile, and the Nesselsdorfer Wagenbau-Fabriks-Gesellschaft (now Tatra) Präsident.
