= Fiacre (carriage) =

Horse-drawn four-wheeled carriage

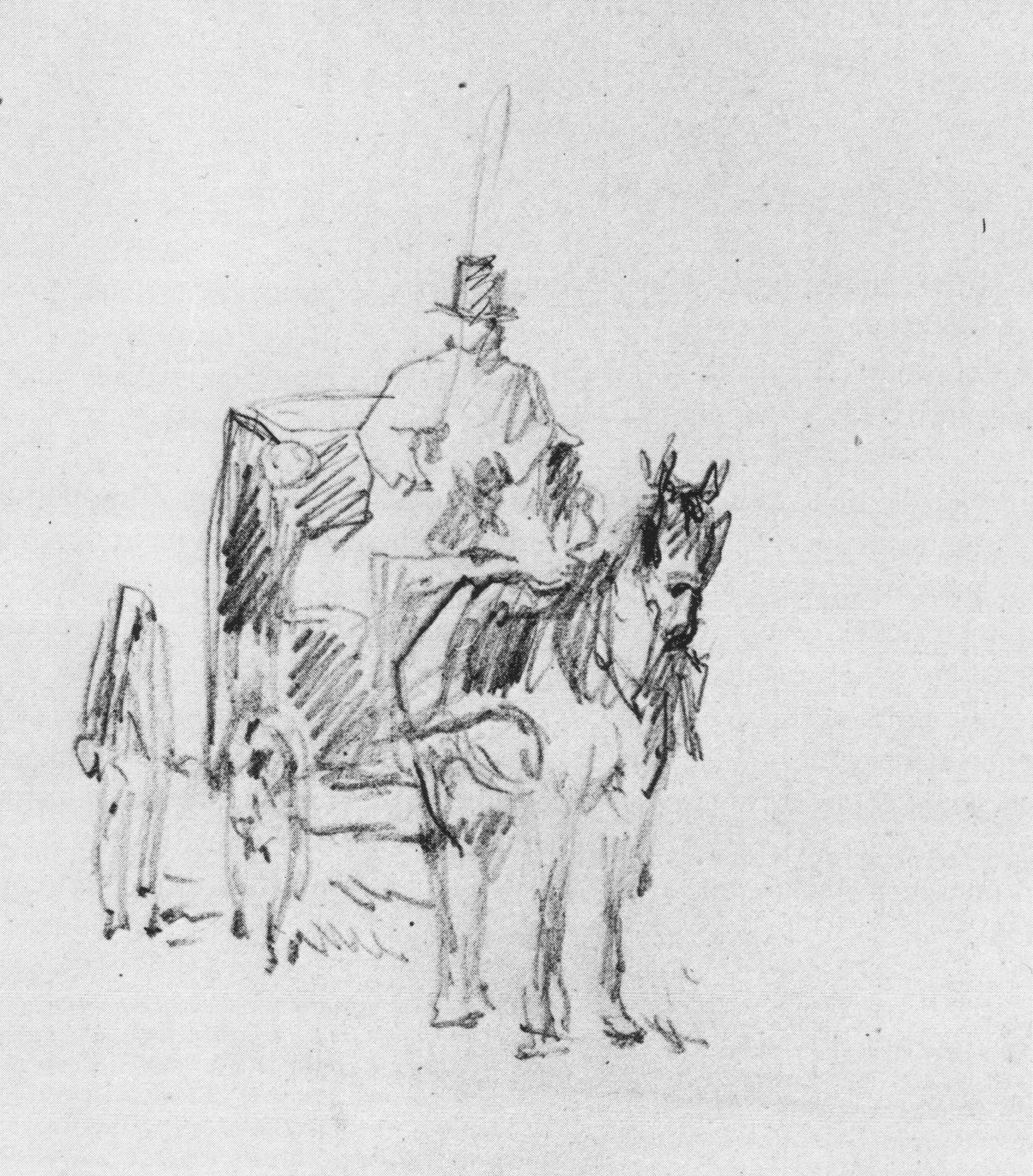
Le fiacre by Édouard Manet (1878)

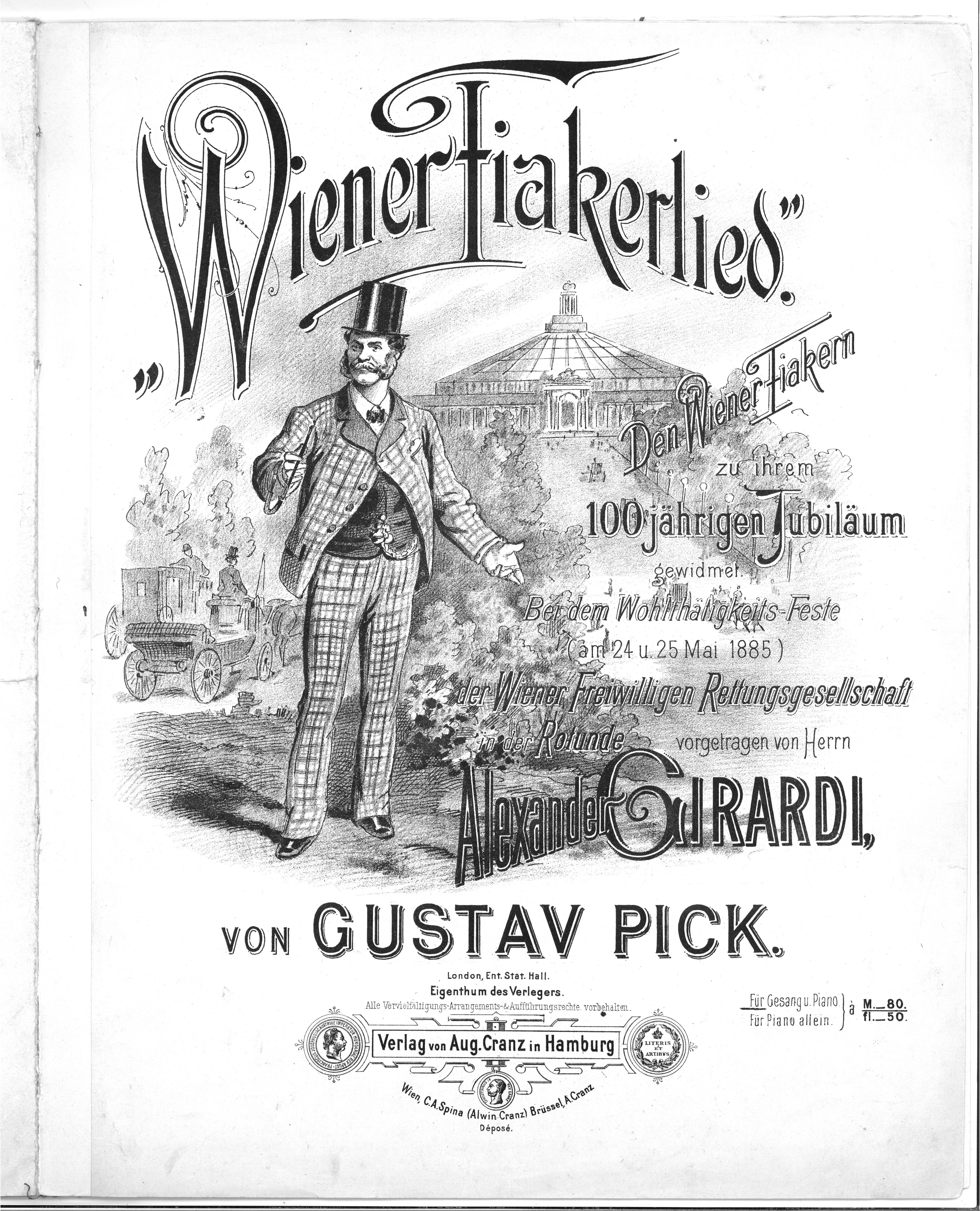
Title page of Gustave Pick's "Fiakerlied"

A fiacre is a form of hackney coach, a horse-drawn four-wheeled carriage for hire. In Vienna such cabs are called Fiaker.

== Origin ==
The earliest use of the word in English is cited by the Oxford English Dictionary as from 1699 ("Fiacres or Hackneys, hung with Double Springs"). The name is derived indirectly from Saint Fiacre; the Hôtel de Saint Fiacre in Paris rented carriages from about the middle of the seventeenth century. Saint Fiacre was adopted as the cab drivers' patron saint because of the association of his name with the carriage.

== In Paris ==
In 1645, Nicholas Sauvage, a coachbuilder from Amiens, started hiring out horses and carriages by the hour in Paris. He established himself in the Hôtel de Saint Fiacre and hired out his four-seater carriages at a rate of 10 sous an hour. Within twenty years, Sauvage's idea had developed into the first citywide public-transport system: les carosses à 5 sous ("5-sou carriages"). These 8-seater carriages, forerunners of the modern bus, went into service on five "lines" between May and July 1662, but had disappeared from the streets of Paris by 1679, almost certainly because of the spiralling cost of fares.

Although the public-transport system had suffered a temporary demise, private hirers soon filled the gap with carriages including the vinaigrette, a two-wheeled chair powered and guided by two people; the cabriolet, a dangerous two-wheeled buggy pulled by a single horse; and the more traditional four-wheeled fiacres. By the time of the Revolution of 1789 more than 800 fiacres operated in Paris.

In 1855, Emperor Napoléon III instigated a monopoly control over the fiacres of Paris via the Compagnie Impériale des Voitures à Paris (CIV), which by 1860 operated 3,830 fiacres and owned 8,000 horses; in this year the CIV carried over 10 million passengers. Fiacre drivers earned about three francs a day, plus two francs in tips. In 1866 the CIV lost its monopoly status and became a société anonyme. It began to use motorized vehicles in 1898 but still operated 3500 horse-drawn vehicles in 1911.

In the 1890s the Parisian music-hall singer Yvette Guilbert introduced a popular song, Le fiacre, in which an aged husband sees his wife in a fiacre with her lover.

== In Vienna ==
In Vienna such cabs are called Fiaker. They featured in popular music, such as Gustav Pick's song, the "Fiakerlied". Fiaker and their drivers also featured in operas of Johann Strauss II and in Richard Strauss's opera Arabella (where the second act takes place at the fiaker-drivers' ball).

== Today ==
Fiacres still survive in Vienna and other European travel centres as tourist attractions.

== See also ==
- Steering undercarriage
