= Le Roy Engloys =

16th century song

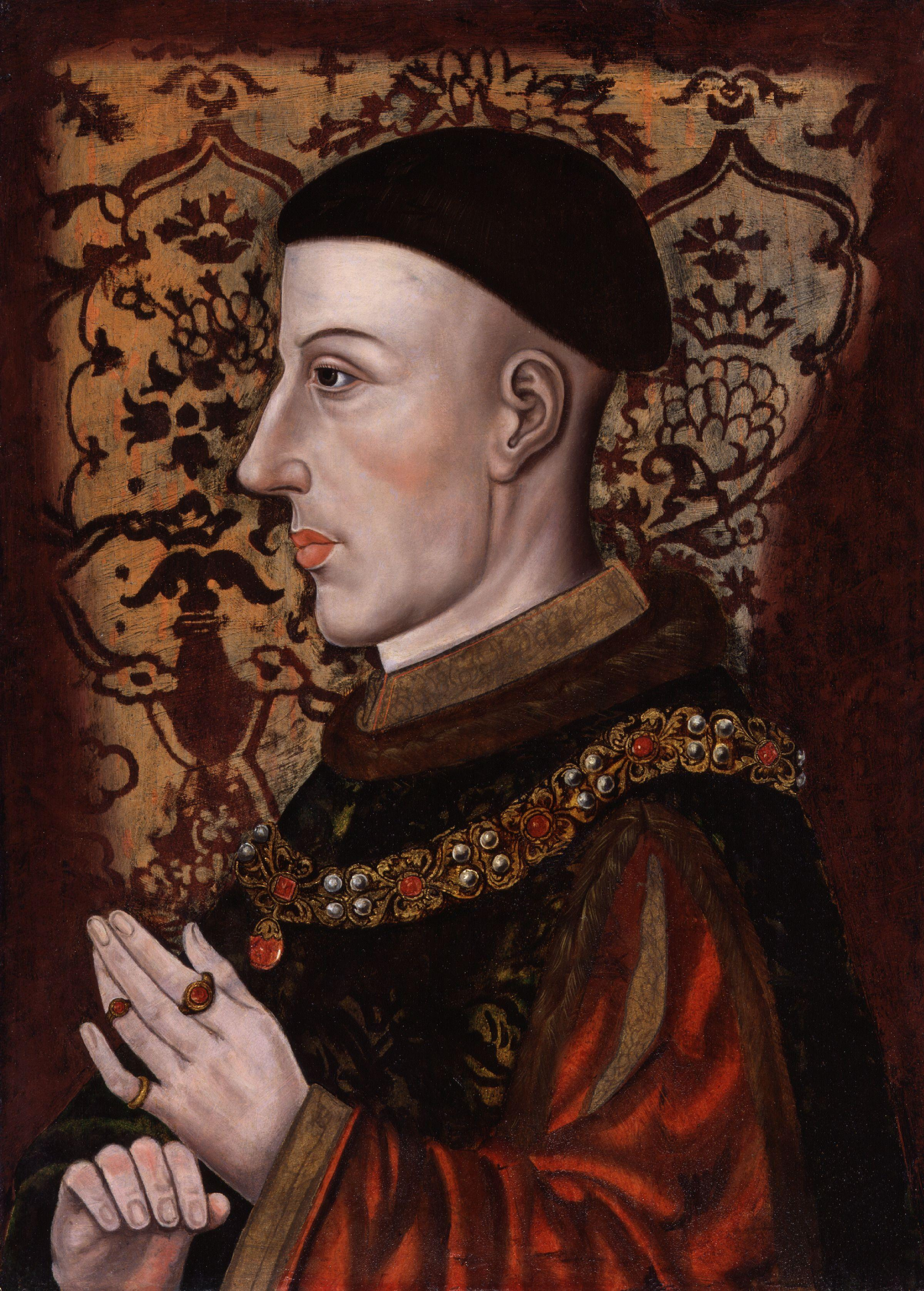
King Henry V of England

Le Roi Anglois (Note: Attested in the Bayeux manuscript as Le Roy engloys.) (English: The English King) is a song found in the Bayeux Manuscript, a collection of more than a hundred songs compiled at the start of the 16th century AD by Charles III de Bourbon and written at the end of the 15th century AD, some dozens of years after the end of the Hundred Years' War.

The song contains numerous historical errors due to the fact that its composition took place close to half a century after the events it recounts. The English King Henry V is said to have died in Saint-Fiacre in Brie, while in reality he died in Vincennes. "Captain Prégent" is Prigent VII de Coëtivy, one of the victors, along with Jean de Clermont, of the Battle of Formigny, on 18 April 1450 (3,500 dead on the English side, 500 on the French side). The Middle French word used for "tails" (couez), bears a resemblance to the word "couard", meaning "coward". The word "Godon" was a French ethnic slur for English people, which may be the result of a corruption of "God-damn".

== Lyrics ==
Original lyrics

Le Roy engloys ſe faiſoit appeller
Le roy de frãnce ꝑ ſappellation
lL a voullu Hors du pais mener
Les bons frãçoys hors de le^{r} nation

Or eſt il mort a ſainct fiacre en brye
Du pais de frãce ilz ſont tous deboutez
Il neſt pl^{s} mot de ces ẽgloys couez
Mauldicte ſoit treſ toute la lignye

Ilz ont charge Lartillerie ſur mer
Force biſcuit et chaſcuns vng bidon
Et par la mer juſquen biſquaye aller
Pour couronner leur petit roy godon.

Maiz leur effort neſt rien que moq̄rie
Cappitaine pregent Lez a ſi bien frotez
Quilz ont eſte eſters et en mer enfondrez
Que mauldicte en ſoit treſtoutte la lignye

Normalised Middle French orthography

Le Roi Anglois se faisoit appeller
Le Roi de France par s'appellation.
Il a voulu hors du païs mener
Les bons François hors de leur nation.

Or est-il mort à Sainct-Fiacre en Brie,
Du païs de France ils sont tous déboutez.
Il n'est plus mot de ces Anglois couez.
Mauldite en soit trestoute la lignée !

Ils ont chargé l'artillerie sur mer,
Force biscuit et chascun un bidon,
Et par la mer jusqu'en Biscaye aller
Pour couronner leur petit roi godon.

Mais leur effort n'est rien que moquerie :
Capitaine Prégent lez a si bien frottez
Qu'ils ont esté terre et en mer enfondrez.
Mauldite en soit trestoute la lignée !

English translation

The English King named himself
The King of France by his own designation.
He wanted to throw out
The good Frenchmen out of their nation.

But he died at Saint-Fiacre in Brie,
From the country of France they've all been thrown.
No more is spoken of these English cowards.
May their whole lineage be cursed!

They have charged the cannons at sea,
Lots of biscuits and a bottle for each of them,
And by the sea up to Biscay they go,
To crown their little goddamn king.

But their effort is nothing but a mockery:
Captain Prigent fought them well
And on land and sea they've been buried.
May their whole lineage be cursed!
