= Hôtel de Saint Fiacre =

The Hôtel de Saint Fiacre was an inn and tavern on Rue Saint-Martin in Paris. It was identified by its sign showing Saint Fiacre, from the 1640s its proprietor was known to operate fiacres (carriages for hire). Through this association Saint Fiacre has become the patron saint of taxi drivers.

In 1645, Nicholas Sauvage, proprietor in Paris of the coaches for Amiens, decided to set up a business in which horses and carriages were to be kept in Paris and rented out. He set himself up in the Hôtel de Saint Fiacre and rented out his four-seater carriages at 10 sols an hour. Within twenty years, Sauvage's idea had developed into the first citywide public transport system "les carossses à 5 sols" ("5-sol carriages"). The sign of the inn was known to display an image of the saint.
