= Sabinian of Troyes =

Christian martyr

Saint Sabinian of Troyes
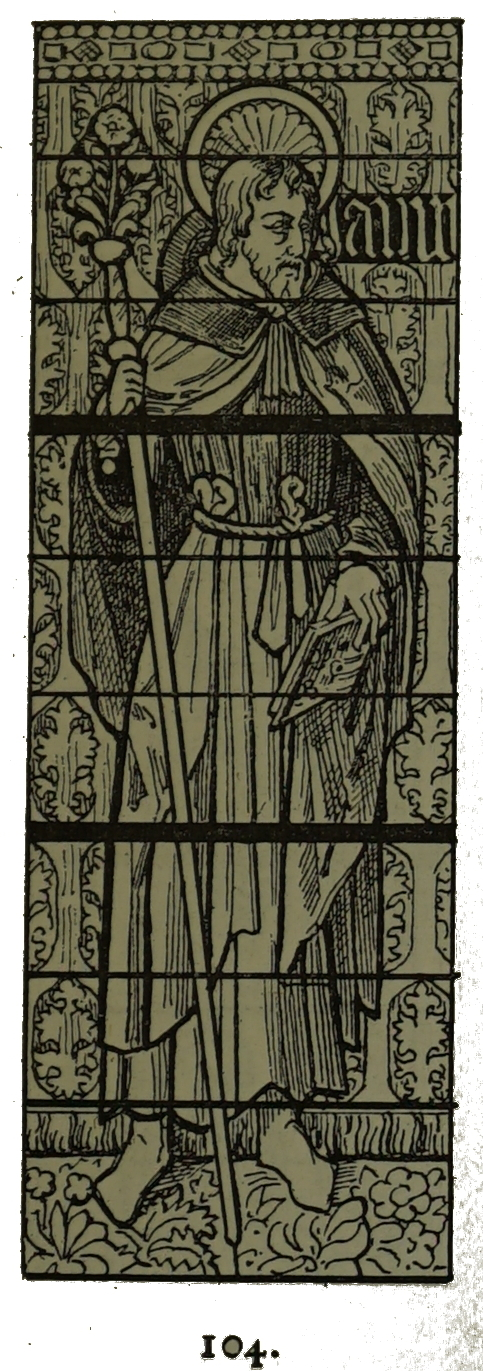
- Born: Samos
- Died: Rilly-Sainte-Syre, near Troyes
- Venerated in: Roman Catholic Church, Orthodox Church
- Feast: January 29
- Attributes: With Patroclus of Troyes; man with throat pierced by a sword; with Saint Sabina of Troyes

Saint Sabinian of Troyes (died 275) was a pagan who converted to Christianity (tradition states that he was converted by Patroclus of Troyes), and became a martyr under Aurelian. He was beheaded at Rilly-Sainte-Syre near Troyes.

His feast day is 29 January.

== Legend ==
Legend has it that Saint Fiacre's sister Syra came to join him in France and became a nun. She was blind, but as John O'Hanlon relates, "Through his merits, St. Fiacre had an inspiration, that his sister should recover her sight, while to her in like manner was revealed the spot where the body of St. Savinien lay. There, prostrating herself, she poured forth her soul in prayer, and her face bedewed with tears, she would not rise from the ground until her petition was heard. She was restored miraculously to the use of vision."
