= Saint Conan =

Irish missionary

Bishop
- Born: 7th century
- Died: 13 January 648
- Venerated in: Roman Catholicism; Eastern Orthodox Church
- Feast: 13 January

Saint Conan (/ˈkoʊnən/; 7th century – January 684) was a bishop of the Isle of Man and an Irish missionary.

== Life ==
Conan is not to be confused with St Conindrius (died 17 November 560), who is said to have been a disciple of Saint Patrick, and to have lived to a very advanced age.

The Bollandists place Saint Conan amongst the early bishops of Man, and John Colgan gives an account of his life and labours. Unfortunately, the history of the Isle of Man in the fifth and sixth centuries is very obscure, and it is difficult to verify biographical details. However, Conan, who is also described as "Bishop of Inis-Patrick" left a distinct impression of his zeal for souls in the Isle of Man. Some authorities give the date of his death as 26 January, but Colgan, quoting from the ancient Irish martyrologies, gives 13 January, on which day Conan's feast is observed.

Saint Conan is believed to have taught Saint Fiacre.

There are also several minor Irish saints who share the name Conan, including Saint Conan of Assaroe (8 March), and Saint Conan of Ballinamore (26 April).
