= Ullard Church =

- Séipéal Iolaird
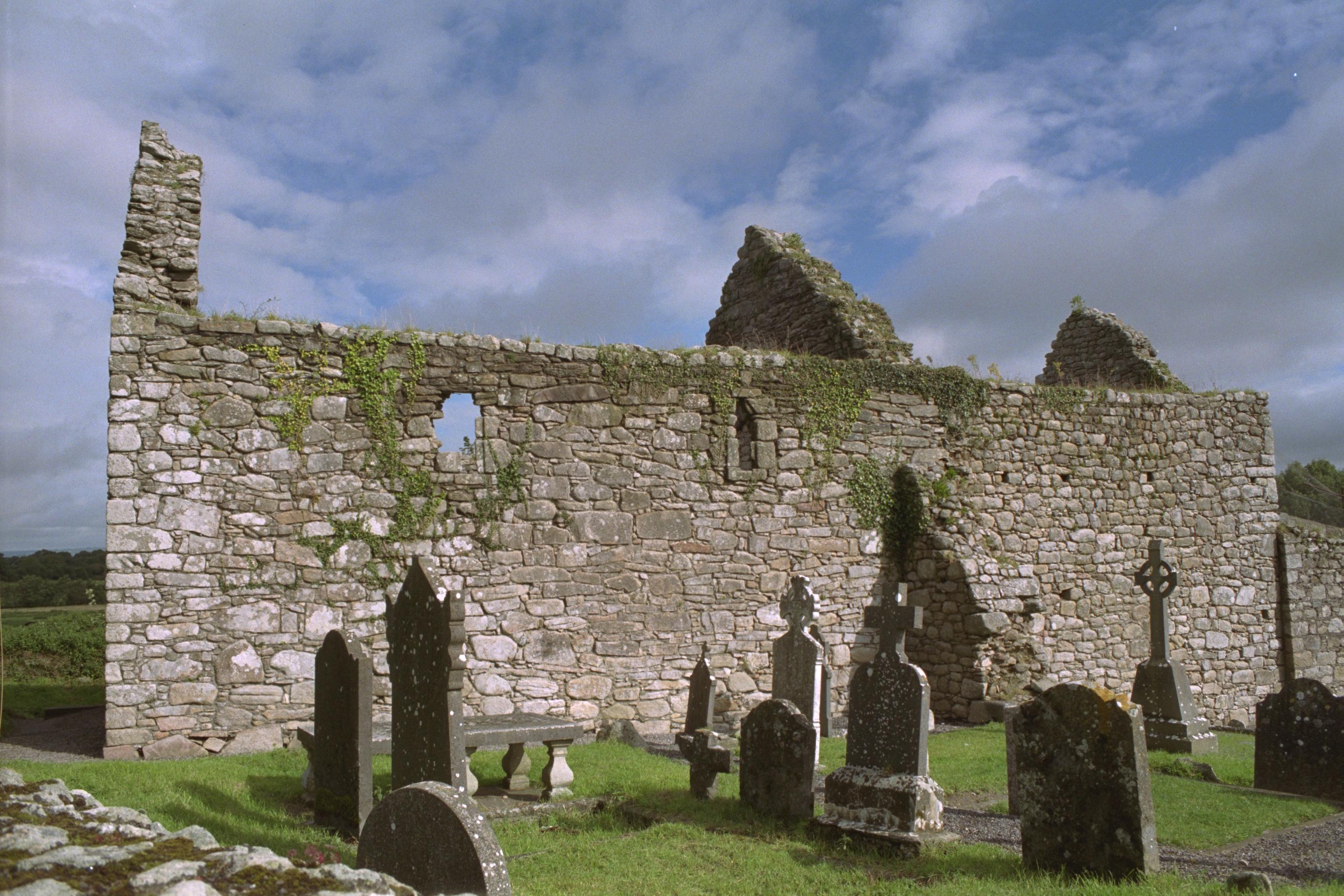

- Location within Ireland
- 52.580245°N 6.932714°W
- Location: Ullard, Borris, County Kilkenny
- Country: Ireland
- Denomination: Church of Ireland
- Previous denomination: Pre-Reformation Catholic

History
- Founder(s): Saint Fiacre, Mo Ling

Architecture
- Heritage designation

National monument of Ireland
- Official name: Ullard Church
- Reference no.: 670
- Style: Romanesque
- Years built: 12th century

Specifications
- Length: 20 m (66 ft)
- Width: 5.25 m (17.2 ft)
- Height: 8 m (26 ft)
- Materials: granite

Administration
- Diocese: Ossory

Ullard Church is a medieval church and National Monument in County Kilkenny, Ireland. The stone church was built in the 12th century and altered during the 16th century. Similarly to several other castles and churches in southeast Ireland, a Gaelic handball alley was built around 1900 using one of the church walls.

== Location ==
Ullard Church is located 700 m (2,300 ft) west of the River Barrow and 2.4 km (1.5 mi) south of Borris, County Carlow.

== History ==
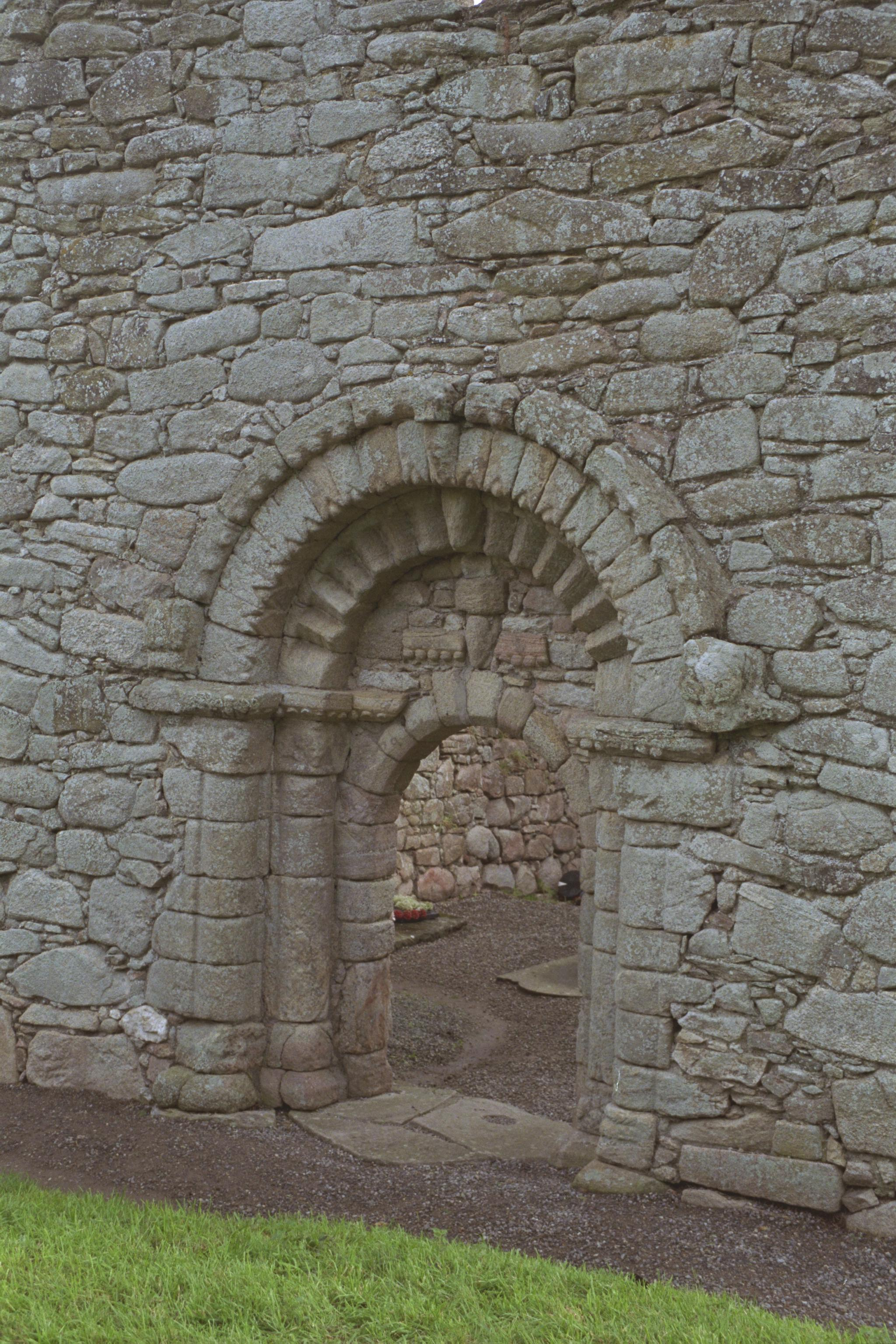
Romanesque doorway

A monastery was supposedly founded on the site in the 7th century by either Saint Mo Ling or Saint Fiacre. A high cross was erected in the 9th century.

The stone church was built in the 12th century and the interior was greatly altered during the 16th century, with changes to the Romanesque doorway, the chancel widened and a stairway built into the wall. Around 1900 a Gaelic handball alley was built, using the church wall for one of the alley walls. This happened at other sites in southeast Ireland; a high stone wall is needed for the game, and several old castles or churches were used for handball.

== Church ==
Ullard Church is a small nave-and-chancel church built of local granite with a Romanesque doorway. It originally had three orders but the inner order has been completely rebuilt. There is a crypt below the altar.

=== High cross ===
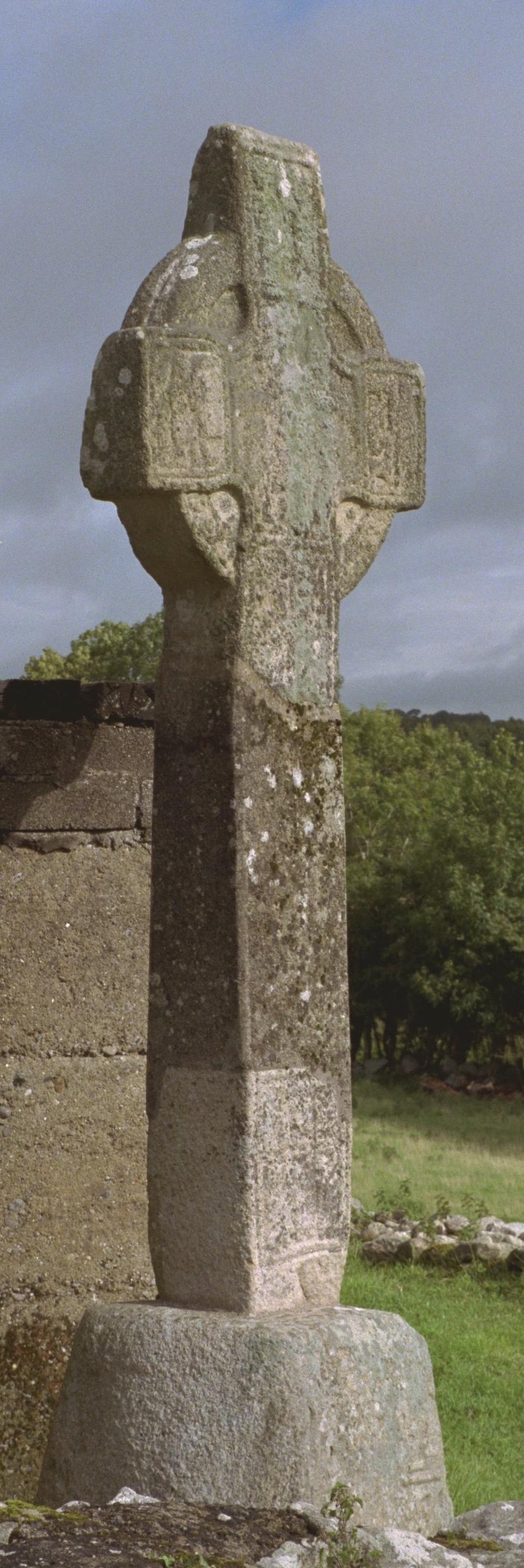
High cross

The cross stands about 4 m (13 ft) tall. It has a closed ring, typical of Barrow Valley crosses. Depicted upon it is the Crucifixion of Jesus, Adam and Eve, David with harp and the Binding of Isaac.

=== Nearby ===
In the field to the north of the Church are two bullaun stones nestled beneath a few trees. Further to the north is St Fiacre's holy well. Local people going abroad would bring a bottle of water from the well with them for good luck.
