= Fiakerlied =

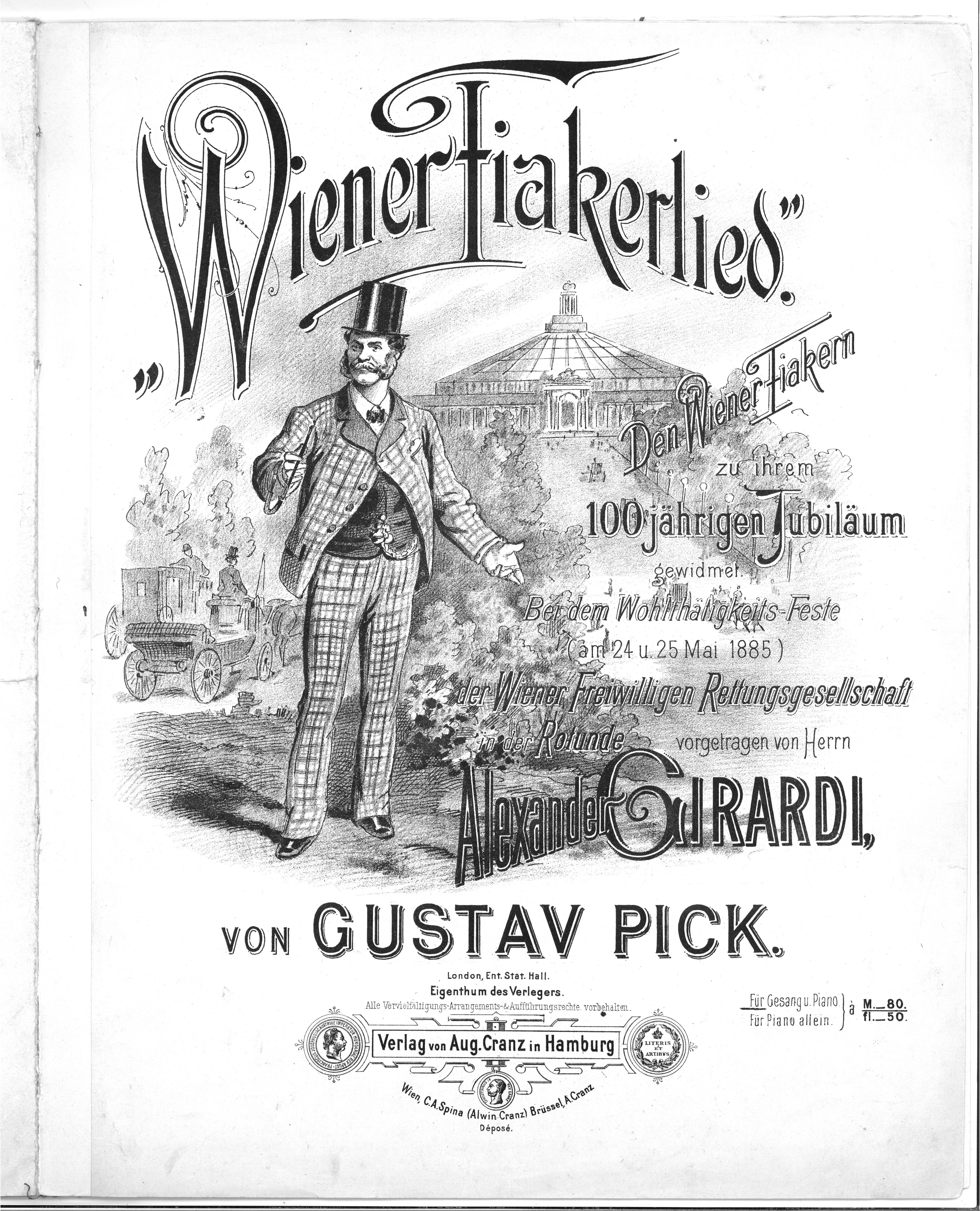
Title page of the sheet music published by August Cranz

The "Fiakerlied" ('Fiaker Song') is an 1885 Wienerlied (Viennese song) with words and music by Gustav Pick.

The song was written to celebrate the centenary of the Viennese Fiaker, a horse-drawn carriage for hire. It was performed on 24 May 1885 by Alexander Girardi at a charity festival at the Rotunde in the Prater, accompanied by Nathaniel Rothschild's band conducted by Wilhelm Rab. The music was published in that year by August Cranz.

It was Gustav Pick's most successful song, and has remained popular. The song was the basis of the 1936 German film of the same name (English title The Cabbie's Song). A notable transcription for solo piano was written and performed by the pianist Friedrich Gulda.
