= Fiacre (name) =

Fiacre is both a given name and a surname. Notable people with the surname include:

== Given name ==
- Fiacre Kelleher (born 1996), Irish professional footballer
- Fiacre Ntwali (born 1999), Rwandan footballer

== Middle name ==
- Etienne Fiacre Louis Raoul (1815–1852), French naval surgeon and naturalist
- Jean Fiacre Kouamé Botué (born 2002), Ivorian professional footballer

== Surname ==
- Jean Guilleaume Fiacre (1730–1805), German writer, collector and charlatan

== See also ==
- Fiacre (disambiguation)
