= Bayeux Manuscript =

16th century manuscript

Bayeux manuscript
- Bibliothèque nationale de France
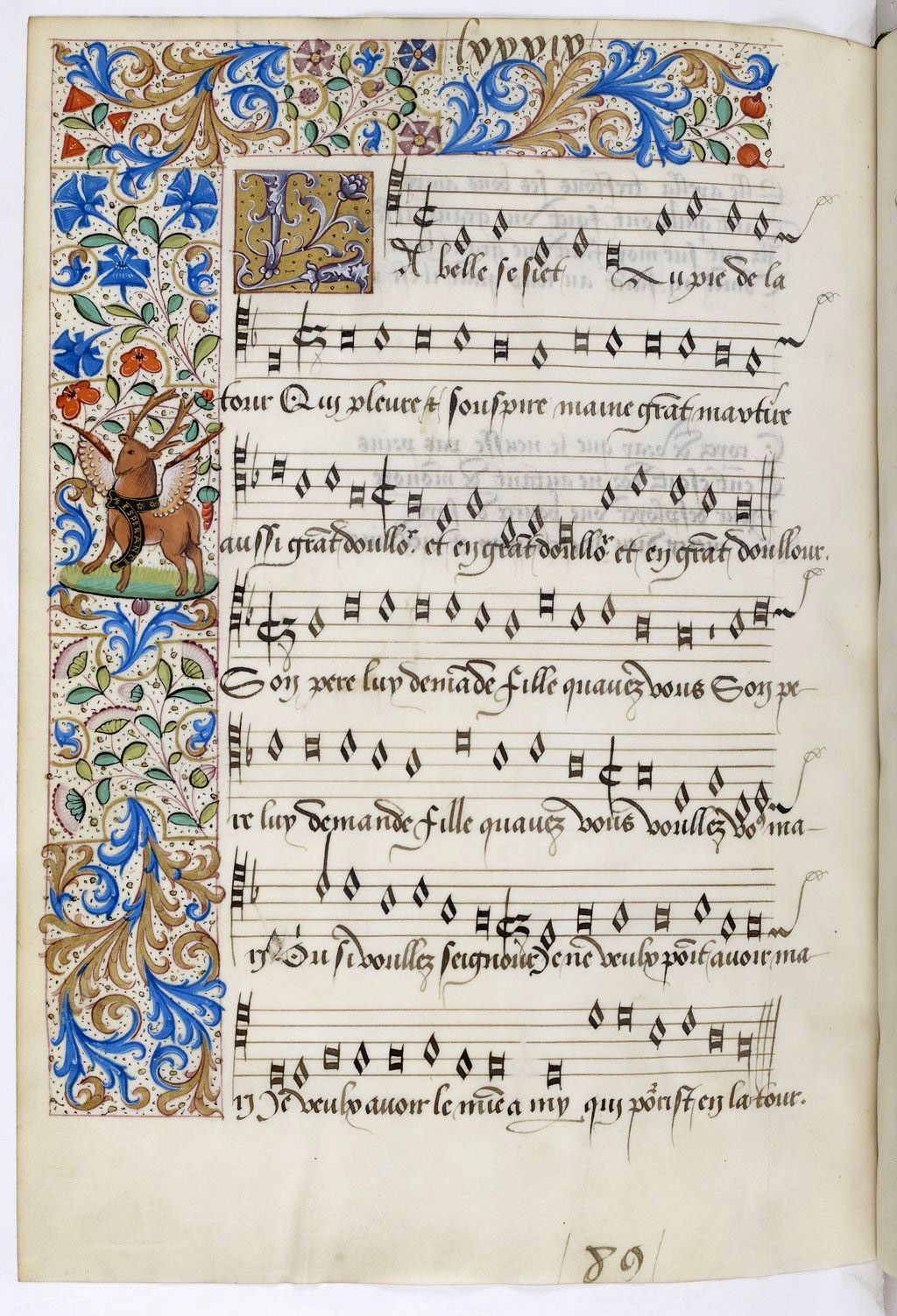
- Bayeux Manuscript, song 89, f.92v

The Bayeux Manuscript is an illustrated manuscript comprising one hundred three songs, collected by Charles III, Duke of Bourbon at the beginning of the 16th century and composed in the late 15th century, that is a few decades after the end of the Hundred Years' War. It is stored at the Bibliothèque nationale de France with designation Fr. 9346.

The Bayeux Manuscript is one of the only two secular monophonic French musical manuscripts from around 1500. The songs are largely of a popular and pastoral nature, unlike the courtly love songs of the previous century.

== Songs ==
- C'est a ce joly moys de may
- Helas, mon cueur
- A la duche de Normandie
- Royne des fleurs que je désire tant
- Le bon espoir que mon cueur a
- En amours n'a sinon bien
- Souvent je m'esbats
- Dieu mercy, j'ay bien labouré
- En despit des faulx envieux
- Belle, belle très doulce mère Dieu
- On doibt bien aymer l'oyselet
- Vostre beaulté
- Royne des flours
- Bevons, ma commere
- Or sus, or sus
- Ne l'oseray je dire
- Hé! j’ai veu le temps
- Royne des flours
- J'ay veu la beaulté, m'amye
- Reconfortez le petit cueur de moy
- J’ay mis mon cueur
- Je suis entré en nouvelIe pensée
- En regardant vo gratieux maintien
- Le grant desir d'aymer
- J'ay advisé ung rosier
- L’amour de moy si est enclose
- Il est venu le petit oyseillon
- J'aimeray mon amy de bone amour certaine
- Fleur de gaieté
- Dieu gard cele de deshonneur
- Helas, pourquoy ?
- Pour avoir fact au gré de mon amy
- Quant je voy renouveler
- HelIas, il est pic de ma vie
- Helas, Olivier Vasselin
- Bon vin, je ne te puis laisser
- Hellas, ma dame
- Ce sont varlets de Vire
- Gentils galants
- Gente de corps
- Ma fame m'ayme
- Au feu, au feu
- Je trouvay la fillette
- Tres doulx penser
- Celle qui m'a demandé
- Puisque Robin j'ay a nom
- Je le lesray
- Triste plaisir
- Mais que ce fust le plaisir d'elle
- En despit des faulx medisans
- En ce premier jour de mai
- Vecy le may
- Adieu mes amours
- Et qui la dira, dira
- Le Roy Engloys
- La belle se siet au pié de la tour
- A mon jardin croist la fleur souveraine
- Jamais amoureux
- M'erme je n'ay point
- Dessoubz la branche
- Triste et pensif suis
- Dieu la gard, la bergerotte
- Baisés moy
- L'aultre jour
