= Saint-Fiacre, Seine-et-Marne =

Saint-Fiacre
- Commune
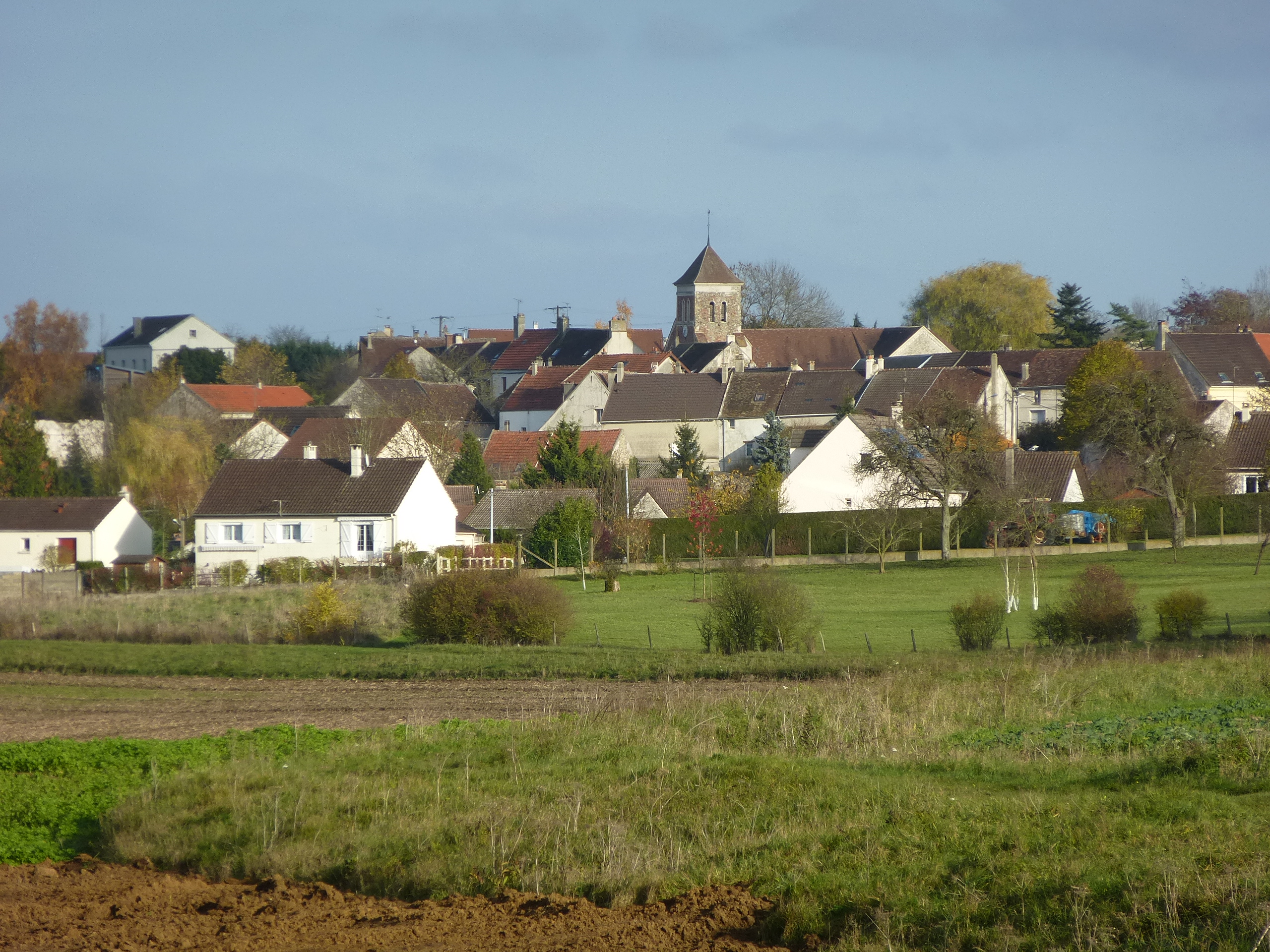
- A general view of Saint-Fiacre

- Coat of arms
- Location of Saint-Fiacre
- Location within France Location within Île-de-France (region)
- Coordinates: 48°55′22″N 2°57′17″E
- Country: France
- Region: Île-de-France
- Department: Seine-et-Marne
- Arrondissement: Meaux
- Canton: Serris
- Intercommunality: CA Pays de Meaux

Government
  - Mayor (2020–2026): David Lourdelet
- Area^{1}: 2.75 km^{2} (1.06 sq mi)
- Highest elevation: 168 m (551 ft)
- Lowest elevation: 97 m (318 ft)
- Population (2023): 523
  - Density: 190/km^{2} (493/sq mi)
- Time zone: UTC+01:00 (CET)
  - Summer (DST): UTC+02:00 (CEST)
- INSEE/Postal code: 77408 /77470
- ^{1} French Land Register data, which excludes lakes, ponds, glaciers > 1 km^{2} (0.386 sq mi or 247 acres) and river estuaries.

Saint-Fiacre (French pronunciation: [sɛ̃ fjakʁ]) is a commune in the Seine-et-Marne department in the Île-de-France region in north-central France.

It is named after Saint Fiacre who built a hospice for travelers at the end of the 6th century in what is now Saint-Fiacre, Seine-et-Marne. He is still revered as the patron saint of Saint-Fiacre.

In the late medieval song Le Roy Engloys, Saint-Fiacre en Brie, Brie being the region the town is located in, is mentioned as the place where the English king Henry V died. This is incorrect, however, as the king died at Vincennes. The error can be explained by the fact that the song was written a century later.

== See also ==
- Communes of the Seine-et-Marne department
