= Gustav Pick =

Austrian composer (1832–1921)

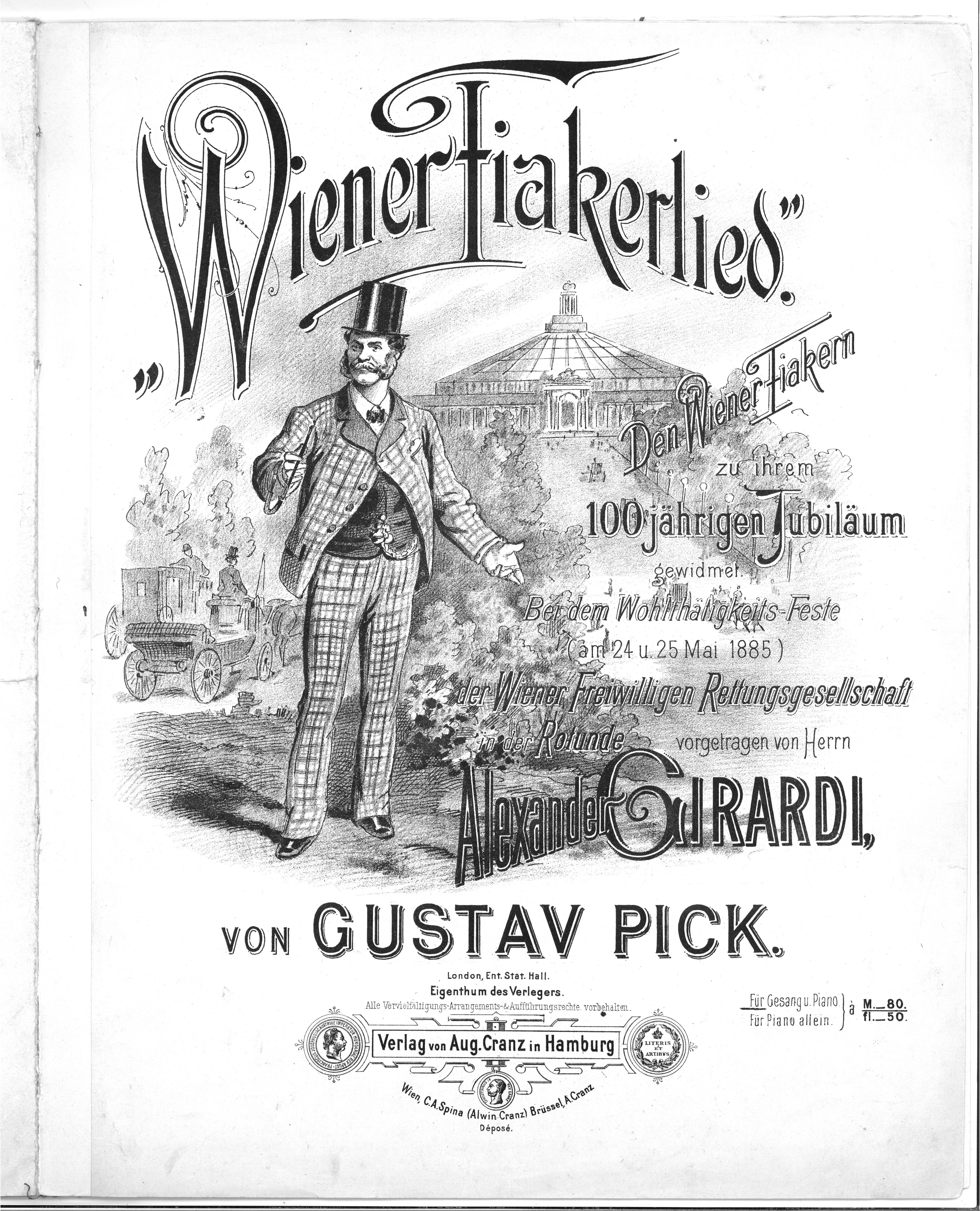
Cover to a score of the Fiakerlied

Gustav Pick (10 December 1832 – 29 April 1921) was a musician and composer of Wienerlieder (Viennese songs). He is best known as the creator of the "Fiakerlied".

== Early life and education ==
Pick was born and brought up in the Jewish village of Rechnitz, where his father was a medical doctor and owner of an estate. His mother was Baroness Schey. sister of Friedrich Schey von Koromla, and he was related to the Thorsch family of bankers.

In 1845 the family moved to Vienna. Whilst working as a bank clerk, Pick took piano lessons and began to compose.

== Career ==
Pick created one of the most popular Wienerlieder, the "Fiakerlied". It was made famous by actor Alexander Girardi, who sang it as his favorite performance piece.

Although he is said to have written other songs, none of his other compositions have survived.

== Death and legacy ==
Pick is buried in the Jewish section of the Wiener Zentralfriedhof. The Gustav-Pick-Gasse, a small street in Döbling, Vienna, was named after him.
