= Saint Fiacre =

Name of three different Irish saints

Saint Fiacre of Breuil
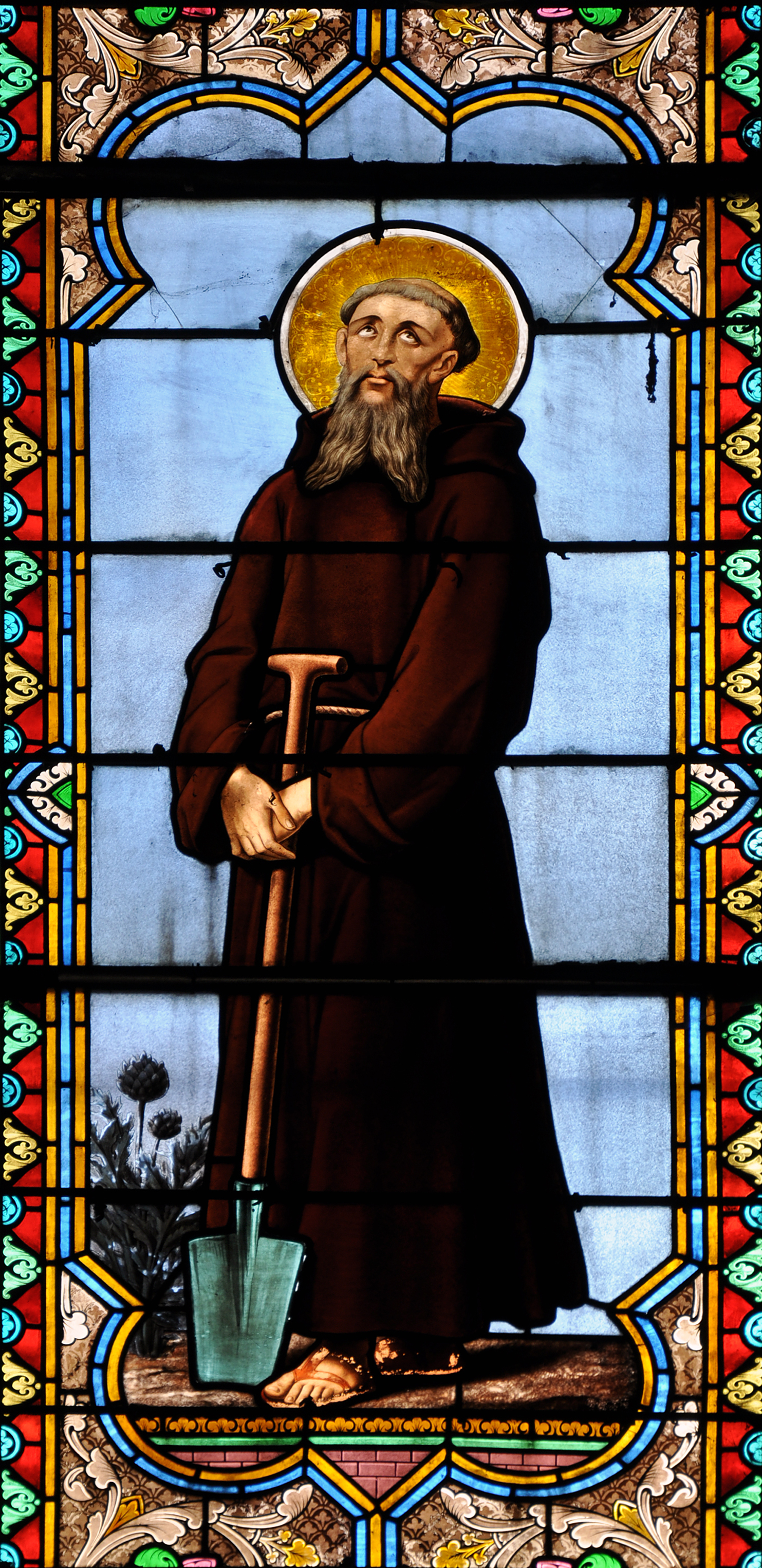
- Stained glass window, Notre-Dame, Bar-le-Duc, France, 19th century.

Abbot, Gardener, Hermit
- Born: c. 600 AD; Ireland
- Died: 18 August 670 (aged 70); Likely Saint-Fiacre, Seine-et-Marne, France
- Venerated in: Roman Catholic Church, Eastern Orthodox Church
- Canonized: Pre-Congregation
- Major shrine: Meaux Cathedral
- Feast: 30 August or 1 September
- Attributes: spade, basket of vegetables
- Patronage: gardeners; herbalists; victims of venereal diseases; Saint-Fiacre, Seine-et-Marne, France

Fiacre (Irish: Fiachra, Latin: Fiacrius) is the name of three different Irish saints, the most famous of which is Fiacre of Breuil (c. AD 600 – 18 August 670), the priest, abbot, hermit, and gardener of the seventh century who was famous for his sanctity and skill in curing infirmities. He emigrated from his native Ireland to France, where he constructed for himself a hermitage together with a vegetable and herb garden, oratory, and hospice for travellers. He is the patron saint of gardeners and hemorrhoids.

== Fiacre of Breuil ==
=== Name ===
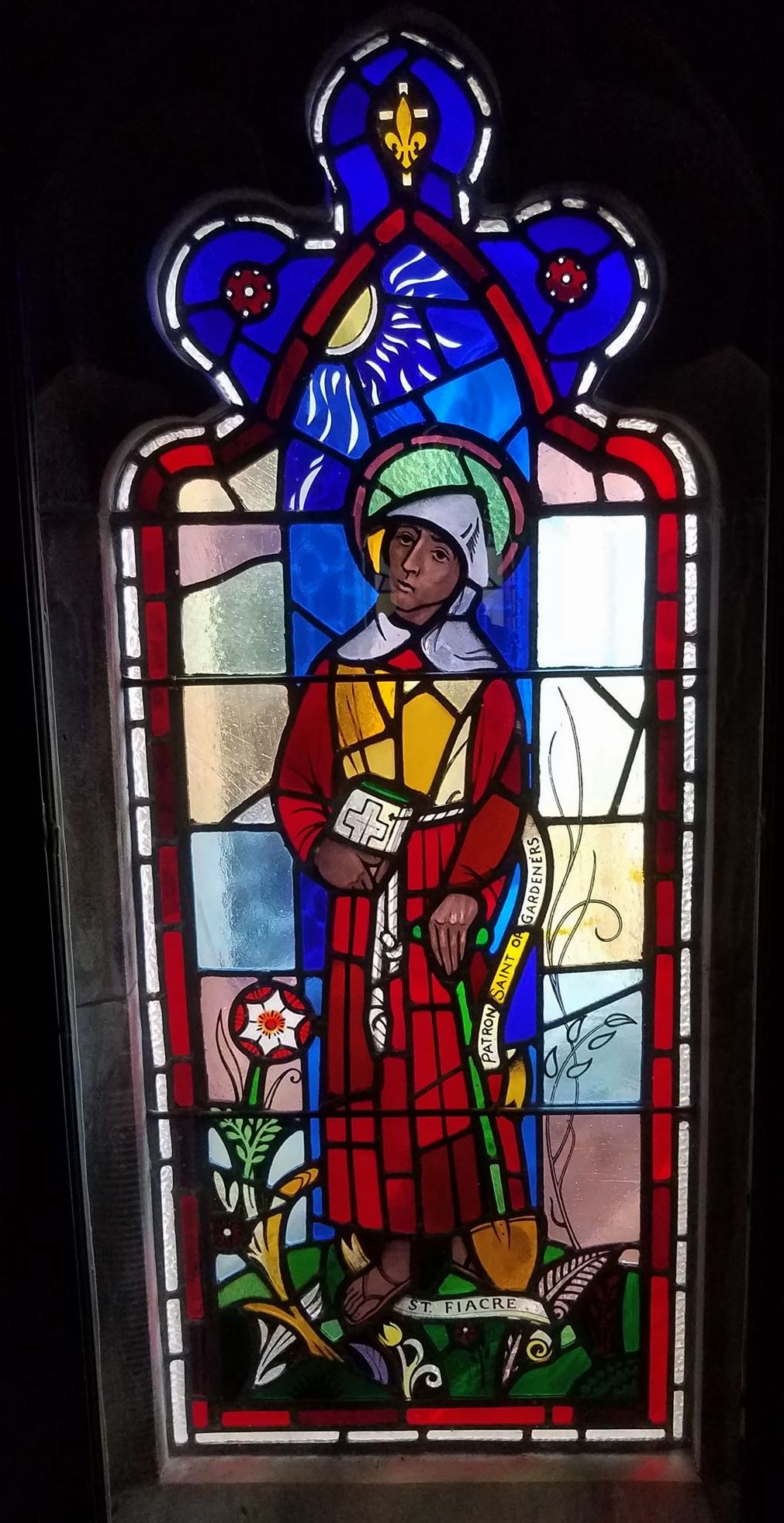
St. Fiacre window, Church of the Good Shepherd (Rosemont, Pennsylvania).

Fiachra is an ancient pre-Christian, Irish name. It has been interpreted to denote "battle king" or to derive from fiach ("raven"). The name is found in ancient Irish folklore and stories such as the Children of Lir.

The appellation "of Breuil" can in present times be misleading: the site of the hermitage, garden, oratory, and hospice of Fiacre was in an unattested *Brogilum in Medieval Latin, whose Gallo-Roman form had regularly evolved into Breuil and Breil (Monasterium quod dicitur Breilum, tribus distans millibus ab urbe Meldis, 11th century in Vita S. Faronis), forming his epithet. However, Breuil was then renamed Saint-Fiacre in his honor, which is the name of the present commune on the same site, in the Department of Seine-et-Marne, Île-de-France. The commune of Breuil-sur-Vesle (Department of Marne, Broilum 847-857), France is located quite far from and is not the same as the commune of Saint-Fiacre (formerly named Breuil), although the two communes probably were both in the ancient French Province of Brie, which adds to the confusion.

=== Life ===
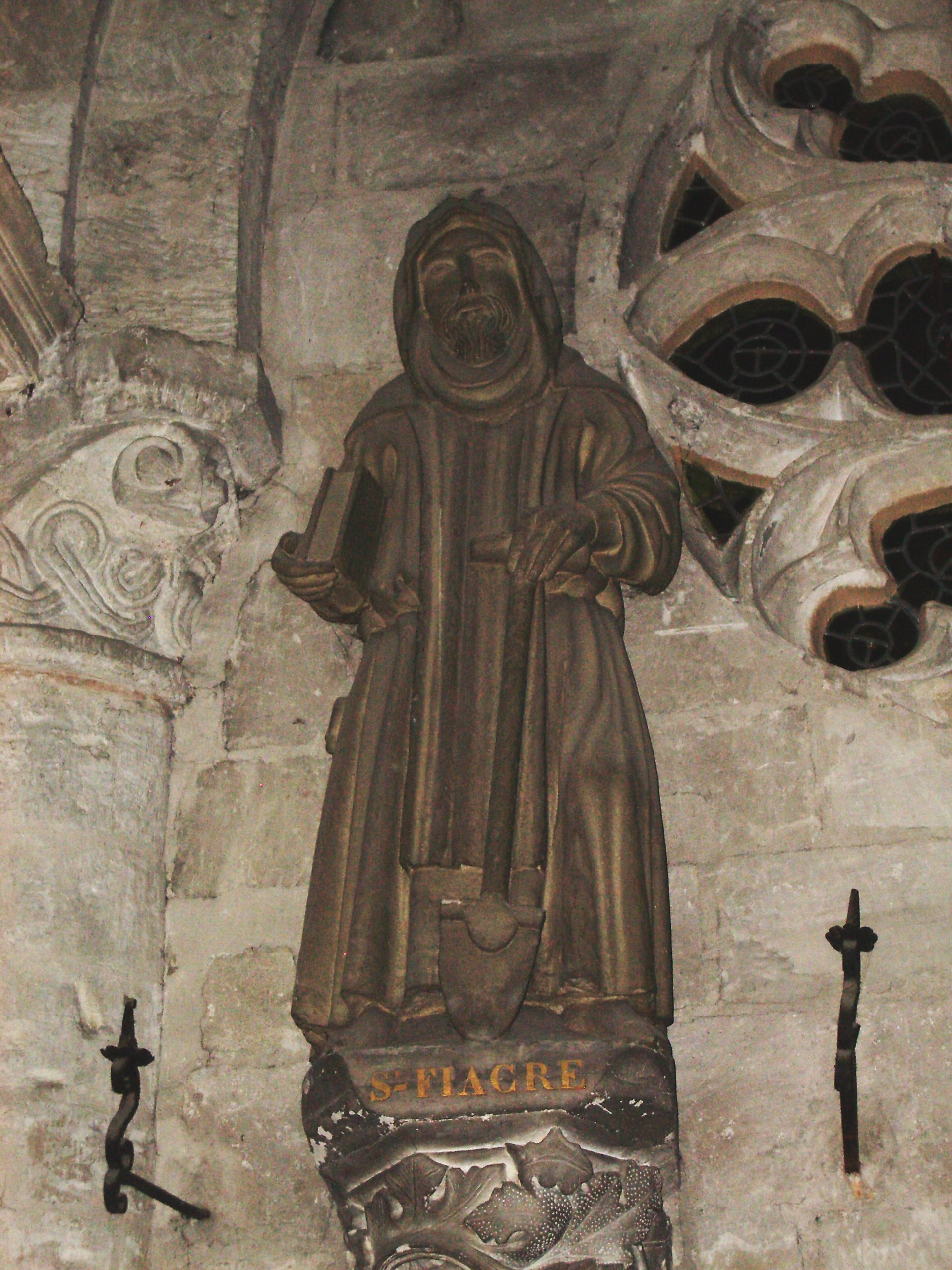
Saint Fiacre, 15th-century statue in the Church of Saint Taurin d'Évreux.

"Though not mentioned in the earlier Irish calendars, Fiacre was born in Ireland at the end of the sixth century AD. He was raised in a monastery where he became a monk and imbibed knowledge of herbal medicine." Fiacre was ordained a priest at some point, and elevated to the rank of abbot. "In time he had his own hermitage and perhaps a monastery, possibly near St. Fiachra’s Well at Cill Fiachra (Kilferagh), Sheastown, in the barony of Shillelogher near Bennetsbridge, County Kilkenny, Ireland. As crowds flocked to him because of his reputation for his holiness and cures, he sailed to France in search of greater solitude."

He arrived in Meaux, France in AD 628. Faro, the Bishop of Meaux, was "well-disposed to him due to kindnesses he and his father's house had received from the Irish missionary Columbanus," and so "granted him a site at Brogillum (Breuil), in the province of Brie" (presently Saint-Fiacre, Department of Seine-et-Marne, France) when Fiacre approached him and manifested his desire to live a life of solitude in the forest. There Fiacre built a hermitage for his dwelling, a vegetable and herb garden, an oratory in honor of the Blessed Virgin Mary, and a hospice in which he cared for travellers. He lived a life of great mortification devoted to prayer, fasting, keeping vigils, and manual cultivation of his garden. "His fame for miracles was widespread. He cured all manner of diseases by laying on his hands".

He died on 18 August AD 670, and his body was interred in the local church of the site of his hermitage complex, which church became his original shrine. The site of his hermitage complex developed into a village, which was later named Saint-Fiacre and is presently in the Department of Seine-et-Marne, France.

=== Legends ===
According to legend, Faro allowed Fiacre as much land as he might entrench in one day with a furrow; Fiacre turned up the earth with the end of his staff, toppling trees and uprooting briers and weeds. A suspicious woman hastened to tell Faro that he was being beguiled and that this was witchcraft. Faro, however, recognized that this was the work of God. It is said that thereafter Fiacre prohibited women, on pain of severe bodily infirmity, from the precincts of his hermitage.

Fiacre's sister Syra came to join him in France and became a nun. She was blind, but as John O'Hanlon relates, "Through his merits, St. Fiacre had an inspiration, that his sister should recover her sight, while to her in like manner was revealed the spot where the body of St. Savinien lay. There, prostrating herself, she poured forth her soul in prayer, and her face bedewed with tears, she would not rise from the ground until her petition was heard. She was restored miraculously to the use of vision."

=== Veneration ===
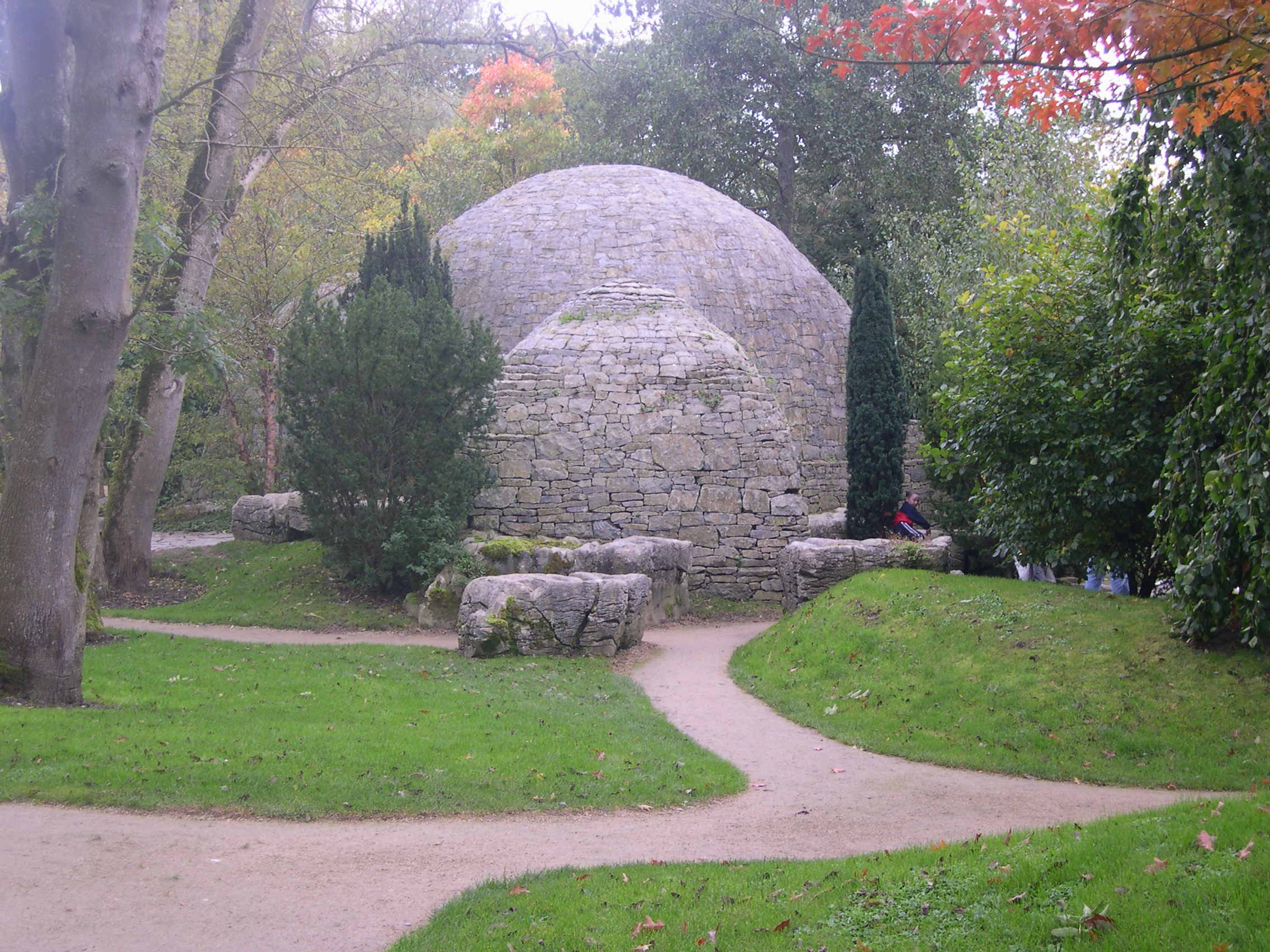
St. Fiachra's garden, Irish National Stud and Gardens

Fiacre's relics were preserved in his original shrine in the local church of the site of his hermitage, garden, oratory, and hospice, in present Saint-Fiacre, Seine-et-Marne, France, but later transferred in 1568 to their present shrine in Meaux Cathedral in Meaux, which is near Saint-Fiacre and in the same French department, because of fear that fanatical Calvinists endangered them. The Roman Martyrology commemorates him on 30 August, although some Catholic sources use an alternative date of 1 September. Meaux continued to be a great centre of devotion to him, especially in the 17th and 18th centuries. Visitors to his shrine included Anne of Austria, Bishop Jacques-Bénigne Bossuet, John of Matha, Louis XIII, and Vincent de Paul. Fiacre had a reputation for healing haemorrhoids, which were denominated "Saint Fiacre's figs" in the Middle Ages. Cardinal Richelieu venerated his relics hoping to be relieved of the infirmity. Wooden devotional figures of the saint exist from as early as the 1400s.

To celebrate the Second Millennium, "Saint Fiachra's Garden" opened in 1999 at the Irish National Stud and Gardens, Tully, County Kildare, Ireland, his nation of birth.

=== Patronage ===
Fiacre is the patron saint of the commune of Saint-Fiacre, Seine-et-Marne, France. He is the patron of growers of vegetables and medicinal plants, and gardeners in general, including ploughboys. His reputed aversion to women is believed to be the reason that he is also considered the patron of victims of venereal disease. He is further the patron of victims of hemorrhoids and fistulas, taxi cab drivers, box makers, florists, hosiers, pewterers, tilemakers, and those suffering from infertility. Finally, he is commonly invoked to heal persons suffering from various infirmities, premised on his reputed skill with medicinal plants.

=== Fiacre cabs ===
From about 1650, the Hôtel de Saint Fiacre, in the rue St-Martin in Paris, hired out carriages. These carriages came to be known as fiacres, which became a generic term for hired horse-drawn transport. Although sometimes claimed by taxi-drivers as a patron saint, Fiacre is not recognized as such by the Catholic Church.

== Other Fiacres ==
Two other abbots and saints are named Fiacre or Fiachra: Fiachra, Abbot of Urard, County Carlow, Ireland and Fiachra, Abbot of Clonard.

== See also ==
- Graiguenamanagh, a village in County Kilkenny, Ireland said to have been founded by Fiacre.

Other gardener saints

- Phocas the Gardener
- Serenus the Gardener
