= Biographical Dictionary of the Extreme Right Since 1890 =

1990 book by Philip Rees

- Cover of the first edition
- Author: Philip Rees
- Language: English
- Publisher: Simon & Schuster
- Publication date: 1990
- Publication place: United States
- Pages: 418
- ISBN: 0-13-089301-3
- OCLC: 22347303
- Dewey Decimal: 920.009
- LC Class: D412.6 .R39 1991

The Biographical Dictionary of the Extreme Right Since 1890 is a reference book by Philip Rees, on leading people in the various far right movements since 1890. It contains entries for what the author regards as "the 500 major figures on the radical right, extreme right, and revolutionary right from 1890 to the present" (publisher's blurb). It was published, as a 418-page hardcover, in New York by Simon & Schuster in 1990 (ISBN 0-13-089301-3).

In the introduction Rees discusses his criterion for inclusion in the book. He describes the extreme right as "opposed to parliamentary forms of democratic representation and hostile to pluralism."(xvii) Among those it covers are Argentinian nationalists, Mexican sinarquistas, American nativist demagogues, Brazilian Integralists, German National Socialists, Portuguese National Syndicalists, Spanish Falangists, and Belgian Rexists.

A - B - C - D - E - F - G - H - I - J - K - L - M - N - O - P - Q - R - S - T - U - V - W - Y - Z

== Entries ==
=== A ===
- (Mexico) ABASCAL, Salvador (1910–2000) Leading member of the National Synarchist Union.
- (Nazi Germany) ABETZ, Otto (1903–1958) Nazi German ambassador.
- (Kingdom of Italy) ACERBO, Giacomo (1888–1969) Fascist economist.
- (Spain) ALBIÑANA Y SANZ, José Maria (1883–1936) Nationalist politician.
- (Kingdom of Italy) ALFIERI, Dino (1886–1966) Fascist politician.
- (Palestine) AL-HUSAYNI, Muhammad Amin, Mufti of Jerusalem (aka Al-Hajj Amin) (1895–1974) Pro-Nazi Grand Mufti of Jerusalem.
- (Portugal) ALMEIDA BRAGA, Luis Carlos de Lima de (1890–1970) Founder of Integralismo Lusitano.
- (Italy) ALMIRANTE, Giorgio (1914–1988) Founder and leader of the Italian Social Movement.
- (Argentina) AMADEO, Mario (1914–1988) Nationalist cabinet minister.
- (Nazi Germany) AMANN, Max (1891–1957) SS Officer.
- (Switzerland) AMAUDRUZ, Gaston Armand (1920–2018) Founder of the New European Order.
- (Finland) ANNALA, Vilho (1888–1960) Chairman of Patriotic People's Movement and Cabinet Minister.
- (Argentina) ANQUÍN, Nimio de (1896–1979) Thomist writer and leader of Union National Fascista.
- (Spain) ANSALDO VEJERANO, Juan Antonio (1910–1958) Monarchist and Falangist activist and aviator.
- (Canada) ARCAND, Adrien (1899–1967) Founder of the Parti national social chrétien.
- (Kingdom of Italy) ARPINATI, Leandro (1892–1945) Fascist politician.
- (Spain) ARRESE Y MARGA, José Luis de (1905–1986) Falangist.
- (France) AUGIER, Marc (known as Saint-Loup) (1908–1990) Writer active with the Legion of French Volunteers Against Bolshevism.
- (Nazi Germany) AXMANN, Artur (1913–1996) Leader of the Hitler Youth.
- (Spain) AZNAR GERNER, Agustin (1911–1984) Falangist politician.

=== B ===
- (Netherlands) BAARS, Jan (1903–1989) General Dutch Fascist League founder.
- (Nazi Germany) BACKE, Herbert (1896–1947) SS Officer.
- (France) BAINVILLE, Jacques (1879–1936) Action Française politician.
- (Hungary) BAKY, László (1898–1946) Hungarian National Socialist Party politician and collaborator.
- (Kingdom of Italy) BALBO, Italo (1896–1940) Leading fascist and apparent successor to Mussolini.
- (France) BARBÉ, Henri (1902–1966) Parti Populaire Français politician.
- (Nazi Germany) BARBIE, Niklaus (Klaus) (1913–1991) SS Officer known as the 'Butcher of Lyon'.
- (France) BARDÈCHE, Maurice (1909–1998) Leading ideologue of neo-fascism.
- (France) BARRÈS, Auguste Maurice (1862–1923) Anti-Semitic politician and writer.
- (Brazil) BARROSO, Gustavo Dodt (1888–1959) Brazilian Integralism politician and writer.
- (Nazi Germany) BARTELS, Adolf (1862–1945) Journalist and author.
- (Nazi Germany) BENN, Gottfried (1886–1956) Pro-Nazi poet and novelist.
- (France) BENOIST, Alain Marie de (1943– ) Nouvelle Droite philosopher.
- (France) BENOIST-MÉCHIN, Jacques Michel Gabriel Paul (1901–1983) Collaborationist.
- (Nazi Germany) BERGER, Gottlob (1896–1975) Head of the SS-Hauptamt.
- (Nazi Germany) BEST, Karl Rudolf Werner (1903–1989) Leading figure in the occupation of Denmark.
- (Kingdom of Italy) BIANCHI, Michele (1883–1930) Fascist.
- (France) BIÉTRY, Pierre (1872–1918) Pioneer of 'Yellow socialism'.
- (Kingdom of Italy) BIGGINI, Carlo Alberto (1902–1945) Fascist Minister of Education.
- (France) BINET, René Valentin (1913–1957) Jeune Nation and New European Order politician.
- (Netherlands) BLOKZIJL, Marius Hugh Louis Wilhelm (1884–1946) Pro-Nazi radio broadcaster.
- (Nazi Germany) BLUNCK, Hans Friedrich (1888–1961) Pro-Nazi writer.
- (Kingdom of Italy) BOCCHINI, Arturo (1880–1940) Head of Polizia di Stato.
- (German Empire) BÖCKEL, Otto (1859–1923) Independent anti-Semitic politician.
- (Kingdom of Italy) BOMBACCI, Nicolò (1879–1945) Early ally of Mussolini and Italian Social Republic figure.
- (Italy) BORGHESE, Junio Valerio (1906–1974) Fascist admiral and coup leader.
- (Nazi Germany) BORMANN, Martin (1900–1945) Head of the Nazi Party Chancellery and Private Secretary to Hitler.
- (Hungary) BÖSZÖRMÉNY, Zoltán (1893-?) Scythe Cross leader.
- (Kingdom of Italy) BOTTAI, Giuseppe (1895–1959) Fascist economist.
- (Nazi Germany) BOUHLER, Phillip (1899–1944) SS officer and head of Action T4.
- (France) BRASILLACH, Robert (1909–1945) Collaborator.
- (France) BRINON, Fernand de (1885–1947) Collaborator.
- (France) BUCARD, Marcel (1895–1946) Leader of the Mouvement Franciste.
- (Nazi Germany) BUCH, Walter (1883–1949) SS Officer.
- (Nazi Germany) BÜRCKEL, Josef (1895–1944) Nazi politician and SS Officer.
- (Kingdom of Italy) BUFFARINI-GUIDI, Guido (1895–1945) Fascist politician.

=== C ===
- (Portugal) CAETANO, Marcelo José das Neves Alves (1906–1980) Prime Minister.
- (Nazi Germany) CANARIS, Wilhelm Franz (1887–1945) Head of the Abwehr and member of the German resistance.
- (Sweden) CARLBERG, Carl Ernfried (1889–1962) Pro-Nazi politician.
- (Argentina) CARULLA, Juan Emiliano (1888–1968) Nationalist politician.
- (France) CÉLINE, Louis-Ferdinand (pseud.) (Louis-Ferdinand Destouches) (1894–1961) Anti-Semitic writer.
- (Latvia) CELMIŅŠ, Gustavs (1899–1968) Founder and leader of Pērkonkrusts.
- (German Empire) CHAMBERLAIN, Houston Stewart (1855–1927) British-born racialist philosopher.
- (France) CHARBONNEAU, Henry (1913–1982) Collaborationist writer.
- (France) CHATEAUBRIANT, Alphonse de (1877–1951) Breton nationalist.
- (United Kingdom) CHESTERTON, Arthur Keith (1896–1973) British Union of Fascists politician and first leader of the British National Front.
- (Kingdom of Italy) CIANETTI, Tullio (1899–1976) President of the Confederation of Italian Unions.
- (Kingdom of Italy) CIANO, Galeazzo, Count of Cortellazo (1903–1944) Italian Minister of Foreign Affairs.
- (Weimar Republic) CLASS, Heinrich (1868–1953) President of the Alldeutscher Verband.
- CLAUSEN, Frits (1893–1947) Leader of the National Socialist Workers' Party of Denmark.
- (France) CLEMENTI, Pierre (1910–1982) Collaborationist journalist.
- (Romania) CODREANU, Corneliu Zelea (1899–1938) Leader of the Iron Guard.
- (United States) COLLINS, Seward B. (1899–1952) Fascist publisher.
- (Kingdom of Italy) COPPOLA, Francesco (1878–1957) Fascist journalist.
- (Kingdom of Italy) CORRADINI, Enrico (1865–1931) Italian Nationalist Association founder.
- (Kingdom of Italy) COSTAMAGNA, Carlo (1881–1965) Theorist of corporatism.
- (France) COSTANTINI, Pierre Dominique (1889–1986) Founder of the French League.
- (France) COSTON, Henry Georges (1910–2001) Action Française and Parti Populaire Français activist.
- (France) COTY, François (1874–1934) Solidarité Française founder.
- (United States) COUGHLIN, Charles Edward, Father (1891–1979) Anti-Semitic radio priest.
- (France) COUSTEAU. Pierre-Antoine (1906–1958) Collaborationist writer.
- (Romania) CUZA, Alexandre C. (1857–1946) National-Christian Defense League leader.

=== D ===
- (Nazi Germany) D'ALQUEN, Gunter (1910–1998) Editor of Das Schwarze Korps.
- (Nazi Germany) DALUEGE, Kurt (1897–1946) Leading Police figure.
- (Kingdom of Italy) D'ANNUNZIO, Gabriele (1863–1938) Precursor of Italian fascism.
- (France) DARNAND, Aimé Joseph Auguste (1897–1945) Commander of Milice.
- (France) DARQUIER DE PELLEPOIX, Louis (1897–1980) Anti-Semitic collaborator.
- (Nazi Germany) DARRÉ, Richard Walther (1895–1953) Agriculture Minister of Germany.
- (France) DAUDET, Léon (1867–1942) Action Française activist.
- (Spain) DAVILA Y FERNANDEZ DE CELIS, Sancho (1905–1972) Falangist politician.
- (Belgium) DAYE, Pierre (1892–1960) Rexist.
- (France) DÉAT, Marcel (1894–1955) Leader of the National Popular Rally.
- (Kingdom of Italy) DE BONO, Emilio (1866–1944) Fascist General.
- (Belgium) DE CLERCQ, Jeroom Gustaaf (known as Staff) (1884–1942) Co-founder of the Flemish National Union.
- (Belgium) DEGRELLE, Léon (1906–1994) Leader of Rexism, Waffen-SS soldier and CEDADE activist.
- (Italy) DELLE CHIAIE, Stefano (1936–2019) Activist with National Vanguard and Ordine Nuovo and figure in the 'Strategy of tension'.
- (France) DELONCLE, Eugene (1890–1944) Founder of La Cagoule.
- (Belgium) DE MAN, Hendrik (Henri) (1885–1953) Collaborator.
- (Italy) DE MARSANICH, Augusto (1893–1973) Leader of the Italian Social Movement.
- (Belgium) DENIS, Jean Marie Louis Ghislain (1902–1992) Rexist ideologue.
- (United States) DENNIS, Lawrence (1893–1977) Fascist writer and diplomat.
- (France) DÉROULÈDE, Paul Marie Joseph (1846–1914) writer, figurehead of the Ligue des Patriotes
- (Kingdom of Italy) DE STEFANI, Alberto (1873–1969) National Fascist Party politician.
- (Kingdom of Italy) DE VECCHI, Cesare Maria (1884–1959) Commander of the Blackshirts.
- (Nazi Germany) DIETRICH, Josef (known as Sepp) (1892–1966) SS Officer and bodyguard of Hitler.
- (Nazi Germany) DIETRICH, Otto (1897–1952) Press Chief.
- (United States) DILLING, Elizabeth (1894–1966) Anti-Semitic writer and defendant at the Great Sedition Trial of 1944.
- (Poland) DMOWSKI, Roman (1864–1939) Founder of National Democracy.
- (Bulgaria) DOCHEV, Ivan Dimitrov (1906–2005) Union of Bulgarian National Legions leader and Anti-communist.
- (Nazi Germany) DÖNITZ, Karl (1891–1980) Admiral and successor to Hitler.
- (Russian Empire) DONTSOV, Dmytro (1883–1973) Writer and inspiration of Organization of Ukrainian Nationalists.
- (France) DORGÈRES, Henri Auguste (pseud.) (Henri d'Halluin) (1897–1985) Pro-fascist activist.
- (France) DORIOT, Jacques (1898–1945) Leader of the Parti Populaire Français.
- (Nazi Germany) DREXLER, Anton (1884–1942) Nazi Party founder.
- (France) DRIEU LA ROCHELLE, Pierre (1893–1945) Pro-fascist writer and activist.
- DRUMONT, Edouard Adolphe (1844–1917) Founder of the Antisemitic League of France.
- (Russian Empire) DUBROVIN, Aleksandr Ivanovich (1855–1918) Leader of the Union of the Russian People.
- (Nazi Germany) DUESTERBURG, Theodor (1875–1950) Deputy Leader of Der Stahlhelm.
- (Kingdom of Italy) DUMINI, Amerigo (1894–1967) Fascist assassin.
- (France) DUPRAT, François (1941–1978) Occident and Ordre Nouveau activist and founder member of the Front National.
- (Slovakia) DURCANSKY, Ferdinand (1906–1974) Slovak People's Party politician and collaborator.

=== E ===
- (Portugal) EÇA DE QUEIRÓS, António (1891–1968) Writer and Estado Novo official.
- (Weimar Republic) ECKART, Dietrich (1868–1923) Early Nazi Party ideologue.
- (United States) EDMONDSON, Robert Edward (1872–1959) Anti-Semitic writer and defendant at the Great Sedition Trial of 1944.
- (United States) EFFINGER, Virgil (1873–1955) Leader of the Black Legion.
- (Nazi Germany) EHRHARDT, Arthur (1896–1971) SS Officer and founder of Nation Europa.
- (Weimar Republic) EHRHARDT, Hermann (1881–1971) Marinebrigade Ehrhardt commander.
- (Nazi Germany) EICHMANN, Adolf (1906–1962) SS Officer and leading figure in The Holocaust.
- (Sweden) EKSTRÖM, Martin Eugen (1887–1954) Leader of the National Socialist Bloc.
- (Belgium) ELIAS, Hendrik Joesf (1902–1973) Flemish National Union activist.
- (Hungary) ENDRE, László (1895–1946) Hungarian National Defence Association and Hungarian National Socialist Party activist and collaborator.
- (Sweden) ENGDAHL, Per Claes Sven Edward (1909–1994) New Swedish Movement leader and founder member of the European Social Movement.
- (Nazi Germany) EPP, Franz Xavier (1868–1947) Leading Nazi in Bavaria.
- ERIKSSON, Elof (1883–1965) National Socialist People's Party of Sweden politician.
- (Weimar Republic) ESCHERICH, Georg (1870–1941) Leader of the Bavarian Einwohnerwehr and the Organisation Escherich.
- (Nazi Germany) ESSER, Hermann (1900–1981) Editor of the Völkischer Beobachter.
- (Argentina) ETCHECOPAR, Máximo (1912–2002) Nationalist writer and diplomat.
- (Italy) EVOLA, Giulio Cesare Andrea (1898–1974) Esoteric Traditionalist School philosopher.

=== F ===
- (Kingdom of Italy) FARINACCI, Roberto (1892–1945) National Fascist Party politician.
- (Nazi Germany) FEDER, Gottfried (1883–1941) Early Nazi Party economist.
- (Kingdom of Italy) FEDERZONI, Luigi (1878–1967) National Fascist Party politician.
- (Spain) FERNÁNDEZ CUESTA Y MERELO, Raimundo (1897–1992) Falangist politician and diplomat.
- (Kingdom of Italy) FERRETTI DI VAL D'ERA, Lando (1895–1977) Fascist journalist.
- (Hungary) FESTETICS, Sándor, Count (1882–1956) Hungarian National Socialist Party politician.
- FEY, Emil (1886–1938) Leader of the Heimwehr and Vice-Chancellor of Austria.
- (France) FILLIOL, Jean Paul Robert (1909–?) Camelots du Roi and La Cagoule activist.
- (Kingdom of Italy) FINZI, Aldo (1891–1944) Jewish member of the National Fascist Party.
- (Nazi Germany) FLORIAN, Friedrich Karl (1894–1975) Nazi Gauleiter.
- (Sweden) FLYG, Nils Svante (1891–1943) Pro-Nazi communist.
- (Switzerland) FONJALLAZ, Arthur Robert Gaston (1875–1944) Supporter of Italian Fascism.
- (France) FONTENOY, Jean (1899–1945) National Popular Rally politician.
- (Kingdom of Italy) FORGES DAVANZATI, Roberto (1880–1936) Italian Nationalist Association and National Fascist Party politician.
- (Nazi Germany) FORSTER, Albert (1902–1952) Nazi Gauleiter in the Free City of Danzig.
- FRANCO y Bahamonde, Francisco (1892–1975) Leader of the Falange Española Tradicionalista y de las Juntas de Ofensiva Nacional-Sindicalista and its successor the Movimiento Nacional, dictator of Spain, known as El Caudillo.
- (Belgium) FRANÇOIS, Josephus Alphonsus Marie (1901–1996) Verdinaso activist.
- (Nazi Germany) FRANK, Hans (1900–1946) Leader of the General Government.
- (Nazi Germany) FRANK, Karl Hermann (1898–1946) Sudeten German Nazi.
- (Austria) FRAUENFELD, Alfred Eduard (1898–1977) Nazi Party politician and official for Nazi Germany.
- (Germany) FREY, Gerhard Michael (1933–2013) Founder and chairman of the German People's Union.
- (Nazi Germany) FRICK, Wilhelm (1877–1946) Nazi Interior Minister.
- (German Empire) FRITSCH, Theodor (1852–1933) Anti-Semitic writer.
- (United Kingdom) FULLER, John Frederick Charles (1878–1966) Tank warfare pioneer and British Union of Fascists politician.
- (Nazi Germany) FUNK, Walther Emmanuel (1890–1960) Nazi Minister of Economic Affairs.
- (Sweden) FURUGÅRD, Birger (1887–1961) Swedish National Socialist Farmers' and Workers' Party leader.

=== G ===
- (Czechoslovakia) GAJDA, Radola (formerly Rudolf Geidl) (1892–1948) Leader of the National Fascist Community.
- (Kingdom of Italy) GALBIATI, Enzo Emilio (1897–1982) Head of the Blackshirts.
- (Argentina) GÁLVEZ, Manuel (1882–1962) Nationalist writer.
- (Spain) GAMERO DEL CASTILLO, Pedro (1910–1984) Falangist and later monarchist conspirator.
- GEELKERKEN, Cornelis van (1901–1979) Co-founder of the National Socialist Movement in the Netherlands.
- (Netherlands) GENECHTEN, Robert van (1895–1945) Writer.
- (Kingdom of Italy) GENTILE, Giovanni (1875–1944) Philosopher of Actual Idealism.
- (Spain) GIMÉNEZ CABALLERO, Ernesto (1899–1988) Early fascist writer.
- (Spain) GIRÓN DE VELASCO, José Antonio (1911–1995) Falangist Minister.
- (Kingdom of Italy) GIULIETTI, Giuseppe (1879–1953) Head of the Seaman's Union.
- (Kingdom of Italy) GIUNTA, Francesco (1887–1971) National Fascist Party politician.
- (Kingdom of Italy) GIURIATI, Giovanni Battista (1876–1970) National Fascist Party politician.
- (Netherlands) GLIMMERVEEN, Joop (1928-2022) Leader of the Dutch People's Union.
- (Austria) GLOBOCNIK, Odilo (1904–1945) Nazi Party politician and SS and Police Leader.
- (Nazi Germany) GOEBBELS, Paul Joseph (1897–1945) Reich Minister of Propaganda.
- (Nazi Germany) GÖRING, Hermann Wilhelm (1893–1946) Minister of many portfolios and head of the Luftwaffe
- GOGA, Octavian (1881–1938) Pro-fascist Prime Minister of Romania.
- GÖMBÖS, Gyula (1886–1936) Founder of Hungarian National Defence Association and Prime Minister of Hungary
- GONZÁLEZ von Marées, Jorge (1900–1962) Leader of the National Socialist Movement of Chile.
- (Kingdom of Italy) GRANDI, Dino, Conte di Mordano (1895–1988) Fascist Cabinet Minister.
- (Kingdom of Italy) GRAY, Ezio Maria (1885–1969) Italian Nationalist Association and National Fascist Party politician.
- (Kingdom of Italy) GRAZIANI, Rodolfo (1882–1955) General in North African campaigns.
- (Nazi Germany) GREISER, Arthur Karl (1897–1946) Leading figure in The Holocaust.
- (Nazi Germany) GRIMM, Hans (1875–1959) Pro-Nazi writer.
- (Nazi Germany) GROHÉ, Josef (1902–1988) Nazi Gauleiter.
- (Nazi Germany) GÜNTHER, Hans Friedrich Karl (1891–1968) Eugenicist.
- GUÉRIN, Jules-Napoléon (1860–1910) Leader of the Antisemitic League of France.
- (France) GUIRAUD, Paul (1850–1907) Historian.
- (Finland) GUMMERUS, Herman Gregorius (1877–1948) Founder of the Patriotic People's Movement.

=== H ===
- (Austria) HABICHT, Theodor (1898–1944) Nazi Party politician.
- (Norway) HAGELIN, Albert Viljam (1881–1946) Nasjonal Samling politician and collaborator.
- (Netherlands) HAIGHTON, Coenrad Alfred Augustus (1896–1943) Fascist leader.
- (Norway) HAMSUN, Knut (pseud.) (Knut Pedersen) (1859–1952) Pro-German writer.
- (Weimar Republic) HARRER, Karl (1890–1926) Founder member of the German Workers' Party.
- (Nazi Germany) HAUSHOFER, Karl Ernst (1869–1946) Theorist of geopolitics.
- (Spain) HEDILLA LARREY, Manuel (1902–1970) Falangist 'Old Shirt'.
- (Weimar Republic) HEIDEGGER, Martin (1889–1976) Philosopher linked to Nazism.
- (Finland) HELANEN, Vilho Veikko Päiviö (1899–1952) Member of the Academic Karelia Society.
- (Czechoslovakia) HENLEIN, Konrad (1898–1945) Sudeten German leader.
- HENNE, Rolf (1901–1966) National Front and National Movement of Switzerland leader.
- (France) HENRIOT, Philippe (1889–1944) Collaborator.
- (Belgium) HERMANS, Cornelius Eduardus (1897–1992) Flemish National Union politician.
- (France) HÉROLD-PAQUIS, Jean (1912–1945) Parti Populaire Français member.
- HESS, Walter Richard Rudolf (1894–1987) Deputy leader of Nazi Germany, he flew to the United Kingdom on a peace mission in 1941.
- (Nazi Germany) HEYDRICH, Reinhard Tristan Eugen (1904–1942) Chief of the RSHA.
- (Nazi Germany) HILDEBRAND, Friedrich (1898–1948) Nazi Gauleiter and SS Officer.
- (Austria) HILTL, Hermann (1872–1930) Leader of the Frontkämpfervereiningung paramilitary group.
- (Nazi Germany) HIMMLER, Heinrich (1900–1945) Reichsführer-SS, Chief of the German Police and Minister of the Interior
- HITLER, Adolf (1889–1945) Leader of the Nazi Party and dictator of Nazi Germany, known as Führer.
- (Norway) HJORT, Johan Bernhard (1895–1969) Co-founder of the Nasjonal Samling.
- (Nazi Germany) HOESS, Rudolf Franz Ferdinand (1900–1947) Commandant of Auschwitz concentration camp.
- (Netherlands) HOORNAERT, Paul (1888–1944) Early fascist leader.
- (Weimar Republic) HUGENBERG, Alfred (1865–1951) German National People's Party leader and member of Hitler's first cabinet.

=== I ===
- (Argentina) IBARGUREN, Carlos (1877–1956) Writer.
- IMRÉDY, Béla (1891–1946) Prime Minister of Hungary and collaborator.
- (Kingdom of Italy) INTERLANDI, Telesio (1894–1965) Anti-Semitic journalist.
- (Argentina) IRAZUSTA, Julio Alberto Gustavo (1899–1982) and IRAZUSTA, Rodolfo (1897–1967) Politicians and writers.

=== J ===
- (Hungary) JAROSS, Andor (1896–1946) Collaborator.
- (France) JEANTET, Claude (1902–1982) Action Française activist.
- (Nazi Germany) JORDAN, Rudolf (1902–1988) Nazi Gauleiter.
- (United Kingdom) JOYCE, William Brooke (1906–1946) British Union of Fascists politician, National Socialist League leader and Nazi radio broadcaster as 'Lord Haw-Haw'.
- (Czechoslovakia) JUNG, Rudolf (1882–1945) German Workers' Party, Deutsche Nationalsozialistische Arbeiterpartei and Nazi Party politician.
- (Germany) JÜNGER, Ernst (1895–1998) Conservative Revolutionary movement writer.

=== K ===
- (Israel) KAHANE, Meir (Martin David) (1932–1990) Founder and leader of Kach and Kahane Chai.
- (Austria) KALTENBRUNNER, Ernst (1903–46) Head of the RSHA and President of Interpol.
- (Weimar Republic) KANZLER, Rudolf (1873–1956) Freikorps leader.
- (Weimar Republic) KAPP, Wolfgang (1858–1922) Founder of the Fatherland Party and notional leader of the Kapp Putsch.
- (Nazi Germany) KAUFMANN, Karl (1900–1969) Nazi Gauleiter.
- KELLER, Carlos (1898–1974) National Socialist Movement of Chile founder and ideologue.
- (Germany) KERNMAYER, Erich (1906–1991) Revisionist writer and Socialist Reich Party politician.
- (Nazi Germany) KIRDORF, Emil (1847–1938) Pro-Nazi industrialist.
- (Japan) KITA, Ikki (pseud.) (Kita Terujiro) (1883–1937) Nationalist writer.
- (Sweden) KJELLEN, Rudolf (1864–1922) Pioneer of geopolitics.
- (Nazi Germany) KLAUSNER, Hubert (1892–1939) Nazi Gauleiter.
- (Nazi Germany) KOCH, Erich (1896–1986) Nazi Gauleiter.
- (Kingdom of Italy) KOCH, Pietro (1918–1945) National Fascist Party policeman.
- (Austria) KOLBENHEYER, Erwin Guido (1878–1962) Pro-Nazi novelist.
- (Finland) KOSOLA, Vihtori Iisakki (1884–1936) Leader of the Lapua Movement.
- (Luxembourg) KRATZENBERG, Damian (1878–1946) Leader of the Volksdeutsche Bewegung.
- (Germany) KRÜGER, Gerhard (1908–1994) Socialist Reich Party politician.
- (Nazi Germany) KUBE, Wilhelm (1887–1943) Nazi Party politician.
- (United States) KUHN, Fritz (1896–1951) Leader of the German American Bund.

=== L ===
- (France) LAGARDELLE, Jean-Baptiste Joseph Hubert (1874–1958) Syndicalist writer and collaborator.
- (Nazi Germany) LAMMERS, Hans-Heinrich (1879–1962) Head of the Reich Chancellery.
- (German Empire) LANGBEHN, August Julius (1851–1907) Conservative historian.
- (German Empire) LANGE, Friedrich (1852–1917) Anti-Semitic writer and activist.
- (Austria) LANGOTH, Franz (1877–1953) Nazi Party politician and Federation of Independents member.
- (Austria) LANZ, Adolf Josef (known as Jörg Lanz von Liebenfels) (1874–1955) Anti-Semitic mystic and publisher of Ostara.
- (Kingdom of Italy) LANZILLO, Agostino (1886–1952) National Fascist Party politician.
- (France) LA ROCQUE DE SEVERAC, François, Comte de (1885–1946) Leader of Croix-de-Feu and French Social Party.
- (United States) LAROUCHE, Lyndon Hermyle (1922–2019) Economist and head of the LaRouche movement.
- (Spain) LEDESMA Ramos, Ramiro (1905–1936) National syndicalist writer.
- (Belgium) LEEMANS, Victor Louis (1901–1971) Verdinaso activist and theorist of the Conservative Revolutionary movement.
- (Nazi Germany) LEERS, Johann von (1902–1965) Anti-Semitic academic.
- (United Kingdom) LEESE, Arnold Spencer (1877–1956) Leader of the Imperial Fascist League.
- LEMBCKE, Cay (1885–1965) Leader of the National Socialist Workers' Party of Denmark.
- (Switzerland) LEONHARDT, Ernst (1885–1945) Pro-Nazi National Front politician.
- (Austria) LEOPOLD, Josef (1889–1941) Nazi Party politician.
- (France) LE PEN, Jean-Marie (1928-2025) Poujadist and National Centre of Independents and Peasants politician and founder and leader of the National Front.
- (Nazi Germany) LEY, Robert (1890–1945) Head of the German Labour Front.
- (Norway) LIE, Jonas (1899–1945) Writer.
- LINDHOLM, Sven Olov (1903–1998) National Socialist People's Party of Sweden politician.
- (Austria) LIST, Guido Karl Anton von (1848–1919) Occultist and völkisch writer.
- (Serbia) LJOTIĆ, Dimitriye V. (1891–1945) ZBOR leader and collaborator.
- (Nazi Germany) LOHSE, Heinrich (1896–1964) Nazi Party politician.
- (United States) LONG, Huey Pierce (the 'Kingfish') (1893–1935) Populist Governor of Louisiana.
- (France) LUCHÁIRE, Jean (1901–1946) Collaborationist journalist.
- (Weimar Republic) LUDENDORFF, Erich Friedrich Wilhelm (1865–1937) General, Nazi Party and National Socialist Freedom Movement politician and leader of the Tannenbergbund.
- (Austria-Hungary) LUEGER, Karl (1844–1910) Anti-Semitic Mayor of Vienna.
- (Argentina) LUGONES, Leopoldo (1874–1938) Conservative writer.
- (Bulgaria) LUKOV, Hristo Nikolov (1887–1943) Leader of the Union of Bulgarian National Legions.
- (Norway) LUNDE, Gulbrand Oscar Johan (1901–1942) Collaborator.
- (Netherlands) LUTKIE, Wouter Leonardus (1887–1968) Pro-fascist priest.
- (Nazi Germany) LUTZE, Viktor (1890–1943) Commander of the Sturmabteilung.

=== M ===
- (Slovakia) MACH, Alexander (1902–1980) Slovak People's Party politician.
- (United States) McWILLIAMS, Joseph E. (1904–1996) Fascist politician.
- (Spain) MAEZTU Y WHITNEY, Ramiro (1875–1936) Nationalist writer.
- (Weimar Republic) MAHRAUN, Arthur (1890–1950) Young German Order leader.
- (Kingdom of Italy) MALAPARTE, Curzio (pseud.) (Karl Erich Suckert) (1898–1957) Fascist journalist.
- (France) MALLIARAKAS, Jean Gilles (1944-) Founder of Third Way.
- (Romania) MANOILESCU, Minail (1891–1950) Foreign Minister and theorist of Corporatism.
- (Kingdom of Italy) MARAVIGLIA, Maurizio (1878–1955) Early Fascist politician.
- (Romania) MARIN, Vasile (1904–1937) National Peasants' Party and Iron Guard politician.
- (Kingdom of Italy) MARINELLI, Giovanni (1879–1944) Fascist.
- (Kingdom of Italy) MARINETTI, Filippo Tommaso (1876–1944) Early Fascist philosopher.
- (France) MARION, Paul Jules André (1899–1954) Parti Populaire Français politician and collaborator.
- (Russian Empire) MARKOV, Nikolai Evgenevich (1866–1945) Leading Union of the Russian People activist and later supporter of Nazism.
- (France) MARQUET, Adrien Théodore Ernest (1885–1955) Neosocialist.
- (Belgium) MATTHYS, Victor Hubert (1914–1947) Deputy leader of Rexism.
- (France) MAULNIER, Thierry (1908–1988) Action Française activist.
- (France) MAURRAS, Charles Marie Photius (1862–1952) Leader of Action Française.
- (France) MAXENCE, Jean-Pierre (1906–1956) Writer.
- (Netherlands) MEIJER, Arnold Joseph (1905–1965) Zwart Front politician.
- (Argentina) MEINVIELLE, Julio (1905–1979) Anti-Semitic writer and Tacuara Nationalist Movement ideologue.
- (Greece) MERCOURIS, George S. (1886–1943) Founder of the Greek National Socialist Party.
- (Hungary) MESKÖ, Zoltán (1883–1959) Hungarian National Socialist Party leader.
- (Greece) METAXAS, Ioannis (1871–1941) Dictator of the 4th of August Regime.
- (Kingdom of Italy) MEZZASOMA, Fernando (1907–1945) Fascist journalist.
- (Italy) MICHELINI, Arturo (1909–1969) Leader of the Italian Social Movement.
- (Japan) MISHIMA, Yukio (pseud.) (Kimitake Hiraoka) (1925–1970) Author and leader of the Tatenokai.
- (Weimar Republic) MOELLER VAN DEN BRUCK, Arthur (1876–1925) Author of Das Dritte Reich.
- (Sweden) MOLIN, Adrian Leopold (1880–1942) Anti-emigration campaigner.
- (Portugal) MONSARAZ, Alberto de (1889–1959) Chairman of the National Syndicalists.
- MORÉS, Antoine Amadée Marie Vincent Manca, Marquis de Vallambrosa (1858–1896) Founder of the Antisemitic League of France.
- (United States) MOSELEY, George Van Horn (1874–1960) Army General and anti-Semite.
- (United Kingdom) MOSLEY, Sir Oswald Ernald (1896–1980) Founder and leader of the New Party, the British Union of Fascists and the Union Movement.
- (Romania) MOŢA, Ion (1902–1936) Deputy leader of the Iron Guard.
- (Nazi Germany) MÜLLER, Heinrich (1900–45) Head of the Gestapo.
- (Spain) MUÑOZ GRANDES, Agustin (1896–1970) Falangist cabinet minister and commander of the Blue Division.
- MUSSERT, Anton Adriaan (1894–1946) National Socialist Movement in the Netherlands leader and collaborator.
- (Kingdom of Italy) MUSSOLINI, Benito Amilcare Andrea (1883–1945) Dictator of Fascist Italy and the Italian Social Republic, known as Il Duce.
- (Kingdom of Italy) MUTI, Ettore (1902–43) Secretary of the National Fascist Party.

=== N ===
- (Nazi Germany) NEBE, Arthur (1894–1945) SS Officer and President of Interpol.
- (Austria) NEUBACHER, Hermann (1893–1960) Nazi Party activist and official in the Nazi German occupation of the Balkans.
- (Weimar Republic) NIEKISCH, Ernst (1889–1967) Pioneer of National Bolshevism.
- (Belgium) NOTHOMB, Pierre (1887–1966) Hard-line Catholic politician and writer.

=== O ===
- (Republic of Ireland) O'DUFFY, Eoin (1892–1944) Leader of the Blueshirts, Fine Gael and the Irish Brigade of the Spanish Civil War.
- (Switzerland) OEHLER, Hans (1888–1967) Pro-Nazi member of the New Front, Volkspartei der Schweiz and other groups.
- (Nazi Germany) OHLENDORF, Otto (1908–1951) Waffen-SS and Sicherheitsdienst Officer.
- (Kingdom of Italy) OLIVETTI, Angelo Oliveiri (1874–1931) Fascist journalist.
- (Switzerland) OLTRAMARE, Georges (1896–1960) National Union founder and collaborator in France.
- (Kingdom of Italy) ORANO, Paolo (1875–1945) Anti-Semitic writer.

=== P ===
- (Weimar Republic) PABST, Waldemar (1880–1970) Anti-communist soldier and Austrian Heimwehr organiser.
- (Argentina) PALACIO, Ernesto (1900–1979) Writer.
- (Hungary) PÁLFFY, Fidél, Count (1895–1946) Hungarian National Socialist Party leader and collaborationist Minister.
- (Kingdom of Italy) PANUNZIO, Sergio (1886–1944) Theorist of syndicalism and fascism.
- (Nazi Germany) PAPEN, Franz von (1879–1969) Centre Party politician, Chancellor of Germany and Nazi diplomat.
- (Kingdom of Italy) PAPINI, Giovanni (1881–1956) Pro-Fascist writer.
- PAVELIĆ, Ante (1889–1959) Head of the Independent State of Croatia.
- (Kingdom of Italy) PAVOLINI, Alessandro (1903–1945) National Fascist Party politician.
- (United States) PELLEY, William Dudley (1890–1965) Founder of the Silver Legion of America.
- (Portugal) PEQUITO REBELO, José Adriano (1892–1983) Integralismo Lusitano politician.
- (Kingdom of Italy) PERRONE COMPAGNI, Dino (1879–1950) Early Fascist leader.
- (Austria) PFRIMER, Walter (1881–1968) Heimwehr leader.
- (Poland) PIASECKI, Boleslaw (1915–1979) Leader of the National Radical Camp Falanga.
- (Spain) PIÑAR LOPEZ, Blas (1918–2014) Movimiento Nacional official and leader of the Fuerza Nueva and the Frente Nacional.
- (Kingdom of Italy) PINI, Giorgio (1899–1987) Fascist historian.
- (South Africa) PIROW, Oswald (1890–1959) Pro-Nazi Cabinet Minister.
- (France) POUJADE, Pierre Marie Raymond (1920–2003) Leader of anti-tax group the Union de Defense Commercants et Artisans.
- (Belgium) POULET, Robert (1893–1989) Pro-Nazi journalist.
- (United States) POUND, Ezra (1885–1972) Modernist poet and fascist sympathiser.
- (Chile) PRAT ECHAURREN, Jorge (1918–1971) Rightist politician.
- (Portugal) ROLÃO PRETO, Francisco de Barcelos (1893–1977) Leader of the National Syndicalists
- (Kingdom of Italy) PREZIOSI, Giovanni (1881–1945) Fascist and racialist writer.
- (Kingdom of Italy) PREZZOLINI, Giuseppe (1882–1982) Fascist journalist.
- (Spain) PRIMO DE RIVERA y Sáenz de Heredia, José Antonio (1903–1936) Leader of the Falange Española.
- (Austria) PROKSCH, Alfred (1891–1981) Nazi Party leader.
- (Norway) PRYTZ, Anton Frederick Winter Jakhelln (1878–1945) Collaborationist Minister.
- (France) PUCHEU, Pierre Firmin (1899–1944) Croix-de-Feu and Parti Populaire Français politician, later collaborationist Minister of the Interior.
- (France) PUJO, Maurice (1872–1955) Action Française founder.
- (Russian Empire) PURISHKEVICH, Vladimir Mitrofanovich (1870–1920) Founder of the Union of the Russian People.

=== Q ===
- (Norway) QUISLING, Vidkun (1887–1945) Nasjonal Samling leader and Nazi collaborator.

=== R ===
- (Finland) RÄIKKÖNEN, Erkki Aleksanteri (1900–1961) Founder of the Patriotic People's Movement.
- (Austria) RAINER, Friedrich (1903–1947) Nazi Gauleiter.
- (Hungary) RAJNISS, Ferenc (earlier called Rheinisch) (1893–1946) Collaborator.
- (Portugal) RAPOSO, José Hipólito (1885–1953) Writer and founder of Integralismo Lusitano.
- (Italy) RAUTI, Giuseppe Umberto (known as Pino) (1926–2012) Leader of the Italian Social Movement, the Ordine Nuovo and the Social Idea Movement.
- (France) REBATET, Lucien (1903–1972) Pro-Nazi Action Française activist.
- (Spain) REDONDO ORTEGA, Onésimo (1905–1936) Falangist politician.
- REINTHALLER, Anton (1895–1959) Inaugural leader of the Freedom Party of Austria.
- (Nazi Germany) REMER, Otto-Ernst (1912–1997) Soldier and founder of the Socialist Reich Party.
- (Weimar Republic) REVENTLOW, Ernst Christian Einar Ludwig Detlef (1869–1943) German National People's Party and Nazi Party politician.
- (Nazi Germany) RIBBENTROP, Joachim von (1893–1946) Nazi Foreign Minister of Germany.
- (Kingdom of Italy) RICCI, Renato (1896–1956) National Fascist Party politician.
- (Spain) RIDRUEJO JIMÉNEZ, Dionisio (1912–1975) Falangist writer.
- (Austria) RIEHL, Walter (1881–1955) Deutsche Nationalsozialistische Arbeiterpartei and Nazi Party politician.
- (Austria) RINTELEN, Anton (1876–1946) Christian Social Party politician.
- (Peru) RIVA-AGÜERO Y OSMA, José de la (1885–1944) Politician and writer.
- (Kingdom of Italy) ROCCO, Alfredo (1875–1935) Italian Nationalist Association and National Fascist Party politician.
- (United States) ROCKWELL, George Lincoln (1918–1967) Founder of the American Nazi Party.
- (Mexico) RODRIGUES, Nicolás (1897–1940) Leader of the Gold shirts.
- (Weimar Republic) RÖHM, Ernst (1887–1934) Sturmabteilung leader and victim of the Night of the Long Knives.
- (Germany) RÖSSLER, Fritz (known as Franz Richter) (1912–1987) Socialist Reich Party founder and member of the European Social Movement.
- (Italy) ROMUALDI, Pino Nettuno (1913–1988) Italian Social Movement politician.
- (Nazi Germany) ROSENBERG, Alfred (1893–1946) Philosopher of Nazism.
- (Kingdom of Italy) ROSSI, Cesare (1887–1967) Fascist politician.
- (Kingdom of Italy) ROSSONI, Edmomdo (1884–1965) Fascist Minister of Agriculture and Forestry.
- ROST VAN TONNINGEN, Meinout Marinus (1894–1945) National Socialist Movement in the Netherlands politician.
- (Weimar Republic) ROTH, Alfred (1879–1940) Leader of the Deutschvölkischer Schutz und Trutzbund.
- (Nazi Germany) RUDEL, Hans-Ulrich (1916–1982) Luftwaffe ace then Deutsche Reichspartei politician.
- (Spain) RUIZ DE ALDA Y MIQUÉLEZ, Julio (1897–1936) Aviator and Falangist.
- (Nazi Germany) RUST, Bernhard (1883–1945) Chief of Reichserziehungsministerium.
- (Czechoslovakia) RYS-ROZSÉVAĊ, Jan (1901–1946) Leader of Vlajka.

=== S ===
- (France) SABIANI, Simon Pierre (1888–1956) Parti Populaire Français politician.
- (Spain) SÁINZ NOTHNAGEL, José (1907–1984) Falangist.
- (Spain) SÁINZ RODRÍGUEZ, Pedro (1897–1986) Falangist.
- (Portugal) SALAZAR, António de Oliveira (1889–1970) Leader of the Estado Novo.
- (Brazil) SALGADO, Plinio (1895–1975) Founder and leader of Brazilian Integralism.
- (Finland) SALMIALA, Bruno Aleksandr (1890–1981) Patriotic People's Movement member.
- (Weimar Republic) SALOMON, Ernst Friedrich Karl von (1902–72) Freikorps leader.
- (Spain) SÁNCHEZ MAZAS, Rafael (1894–1966) Falangist.
- (Portugal) SANTOS COSTA, Fernando (1899–1982) Estado Novo Minister of War.
- (Portugal) SARDINHA, Antonio (1888–1925) Integralismo Lusitano figure.
- (Nazi Germany) SAUCKEL, Fritz Ernst Christoph (1894–1946) General Plenipotentiary for Labour Deployment .
- (Nazi Germany) SCHACHT, Hjalmar Horace Greeley (1877–1970) President of the Reichsbank.
- (Switzerland) SCHAFFNER, Jakob (1875–1944) Pro-Nazi novelist.
- (Nazi Germany) SCHELLENBERG, Walter (1910–1952) SS Head of Foreign Intelligence.
- (Nazi Germany) SCHIRACH, Baldur von (1907–1974) Leader of the Hitler Youth.
- (Nazi Germany) SCHMITT, Carl (1888–1985) Professor of law.
- (Austria) SCHÖNERER, Georg, Ritter von (1842–1921) Pan-German politician.
- (Kingdom of Italy) SCORZA, Carlo (1897–1988) Secretary of the National Fascist Party.
- (Weimar Republic) SEBOTTENDORF, Rudolf von (pseud.) (Adam Alfred Rudolf Glauer) (1875–1945) Leading member of the Thule Society.
- (Weimar Republic) SELDTE, Franz (1882–1947) Founder and Leader of Der Stahlhelm and Nazi official.
- (Spain) SERRANO SUÑER, Ramón (1901–2003) Spanish Foreign Minister.
- (Austria) SEYSS-INQUART, Arthur (1892–1946) Austrian Chancellor and Nazi German official.
- (France) SICARD, Maurice-Yvan (1910–2000) Parti Populaire Français writer known as 'Saint-Paulien'.
- (Slovakia) SIDOR, Karol (1901–1953) Slovak People's Party politician.
- (France) SIDOS, Pierre (1927–2020) Founder of Jeune Nation and Occident.
- (Romania) SIMA, Horia (1907–1993) Second leader of the Iron Guard.
- (Finland) SIMOJOKI, Lauri Elias (before 1926, Simelius) (1899–1940) Chairman of the Academic Karelia Society and leader of the Patriotic People's Movement youth.
- (Nazi Germany) SIMON, Gustav (1900–1945) Nazi Gauleiter.
- (Netherlands) SINCLAIR DE ROCHEMONT, Hugue Alexandre (1901–1942) National Front and National Socialist Dutch Workers Party politician.
- (Estonia) SIRK, Artur (1900–1937) Founder of the Vaps Movement.
- (Norway) SKANCKE, Ragnard Sigvald (1890–1948) Collaborationist minister.
- (Nazi Germany) SKORZENY, Otto (1908–1975) Nazi adventurer and subsequent paramilitary director.
- (United States) SMITH, Gerald Lyman Kenneth (1898–1976) Leading figure in Share Our Wealth and the America First Party.
- (Kingdom of Italy) SOFFICI, Ardengo (1879–1964) Fascist intellectual.
- (Finland) SOMERSALO, Arne Sakari (1891–1941) Finnish Air Force pioneer and anti-communist.
- (Switzerland) SONDEREGGER, Emil (1898–1934) General and National Front politician.
- (France) SOREL, Georges (1847–1922) Syndicalist philosopher.
- (France) SOULÉS, Georges Raymond (1907–1986) Mouvement Social Révolutionnaire politician and esoteric writer (nom de plume:Raymond Abellio).
- (Austria) SPANN, Othmar (1878–1950) Philosopher, sociologist and economist.
- (Nazi Germany) SPEER, Albert (1905–1981) Architect and Reich Minister of Armaments and War Production.
- (Weimar Republic) SPENGLER, Oswald (1880–1936) Philosopher and historian.
- (Kingdom of Italy) SPIRITO, Ugo (1896–1979) Fascist academic of corporatism.
- (Bulgaria) STALIYSKI, Aleksandar (1893–1945) Collaborator.
- (Norway) STANG, Axel (1904–1974) Collaborationist minister in Nasjonal Samling government.
- (Kingdom of Italy) STARACE, Achille (1889–1945) National Fascist Party party secretary.
- (Austria) STARHEMBERG, Ernst Rüdiger Camillo Maria, 7th Prince of (1899–1956) Freikorps Oberland, Nazi Party and Fatherland's Front activist.
- (Austria) STEIDLE, Richard (1881–1940) Heimwehr leader.
- (German Empire) STÖCKER, Adolf (1835–1909) Theologian, chaplain to Kaiser Wilhelm II and founder of the Christian Social Party.
- (Nazi Germany) STRASSER, Gregor (1892–1934) Leader of the left wing of the Nazi Party and victim of the Night of the Long Knives.
- (Nazi Germany) STRASSER, Otto (1897–1974) Dissident Nazi and later head of the German Social Union.
- (Belgium) STREEL, Lucien Alphonse Joseph (known as José) (1911–1946) Rexist journalist.
- (Nazi Germany) STREICHER, Julius (1885–1946) Nazi propagandist and publisher of Der Stürmer.
- (Czechoslovakia) STŘIBRNÝ, Jiří (Ferdinand) (1880–1955) Former socialist imprisoned for collaboration.
- (Nazi Germany) STUCKART, Wilhelm (1902–1953) Nazi lawyer and State Secretary.
- (Hungary) SZÁLASI, Ferenc (1897–1946) Collaborator and leader of the Arrow Cross Party.

=== T ===
- TAITTINGER, Pierre Charles (1887–1965) Chairman of the Paris council during the German occupation of France.
- (Kingdom of Italy) TAMBURINI, Tullio (1892–1957) Police chief.
- (Nazi Germany) TERBOVEN, Josef Antonius Heinrich (1898–1945) Reichskommissar of Norway.
- (South Africa) TERRE'BLANCHE, Eugene Ney (1941–2010) Founder and leader of the Afrikaner Weerstandsbeweging.
- THADDEN, Adolf von (1921–1996) Chairman of the National Democratic Party of Germany.
- (Nazi Germany) THIERACK, Otto Georg (1889–1946) Reich Minister of Justice.
- (Belgium) THIRIART, Jean François (1922–1992) Leader of Jeune Europe and later a National Bolshevik.
- (Slovakia) TISO, Jozef Gašpar (1887–1947) Slovak People's Party politician and priest.
- (France) TIXIER-VIGNANCOUR, Jean-Louis Gilbert (1907–1989) Vichy government official and independent politician.
- (Switzerland) TOBLER, Robert (1901–1962) Chairman of the National Front.
- (Nazi Germany) TODT, Fritz (1881–1942) Founder of the Nazi Organisation Todt.
- (Belgium) TOLLENAERE, Reimond (1909–1942) Flemish National Union politician and SS Officer.
- (Bulgaria) TSANKOV, Aleksandar (1897–1959) Prime Minister and founder of the National Social Movement.
- (Slovakia) TUKA, Vojtech 'Bela' (1880–1946) Prime Minister of the Slovak Republic.
- (Italy) TURATI, Augusto (1888–1955) Fascist journalist and politician.

=== U ===
- (Bolivia) ÚNZAGA de la Vega, Óscar (1916–1959) Leader of the Bolivian Socialist Falange.

=== V ===
- (France) VACHER DE LAPOUGE, Georges (1854–1936) Eugenicist.
- (France) VALLAT, Xavier (1891–1972) Anti-Semitic collaborationist.
- (France) VALOIS, Georges (pseud.) (Alfred Georges Gressent) (1894–1945) Politician and writer.
- (South Africa) VAN RENSBURG, Johannes Frederik Janse (1898–1966) Leader of the Ossewabrandwag.
- (Belgium) VAN SEVEREN, Georges Edmond Edouard (known as Joris) (1894–1940) Leader of Verdinaso.
- (France) VAUGEOIS, Henri (1864–1916) Founder member of Action Française.
- (Nazi Germany) VEESENMAYER, Edmund (1904–1977) SS Officer and figure in The Holocaust.
- (Spain) VEGAS LATAPIÉ, Eugenio (1907–1985) Leading member of Acción Española.
- (France) VENNER, Dominique (1935–2013) Organisation armée secrète and Groupement de recherche et d'études pour la civilisation européenne activist.
- (Kingdom of Italy) VIDUSSONI, Aldo (1914–1982) National Fascist Party politician.
- (Lithuania) VOLDEMARAS, Augustinas (1883–1942) Twice Prime Minister.
- (Kingdom of Italy) VOLPI DI MISURATA, Giuseppe (1877–1947) President of Confindustria.

=== W ===
- (Nazi Germany) WAGNER, Adolf (1890–1944) Nazi soldier and politician.
- (Nazi Germany) WAGNER, Josef (1899–1945) Nazi Gauleiter.
- (Nazi Germany) WAGNER, Robert (1895–1946) Nazi Gauleiter and Head of Civil Government in occupied Alsace.
- (Finland) WALLENIUS, Kurt Martti (1893–1984) Commander of the White Guard.
- (South Africa) WEICHARDT, Louis Theodor (1894–1985) Leader of the Greyshirts.
- (United States) WELCH, Robert Henry Winborne (1899–1985) Co-founder of the John Birch Society.
- (Weimar Republic) WESSEL, Horst (1907–1930) Early Nazi martyr.
- (Belgium) WIELE, Jef van de (1903–1979) Nazi activist in Flanders. Co-founder of Devlag.
- (United States) WINROD, Gerald Burton (1900–1957) Anti-Semitic evangelist.
- (Nazi Germany) WOLFF, Karl Friedrich Otto (1900–1984) Waffen-SS General.
- (Weimar Republic) WULLE, Reinhold (1882–1950) Founder of the German Völkisch Freedom Party.

=== Y ===
- (Spain) YAGÜE Blanco, Juan Lorenzo Teodoro (1891–1952) Falangist officer.

=== Z ===
- (Nazi Germany) ZEHRER, Hans (1899–1966) Editor of Die Tat.

== Publication ==
It was first published by Harvester Wheatsheaf in 1990, in a 418 page edition. By 2000, it was out of print. Jeffrey Kaplan cited this as a reason for the existence of his 2000 book the Encyclopedia of White Power, to fill a gap in the literature caused by its absence.

== Reception ==
The book received a positive review from Andreas Sobisch in German Studies Review, who praised it as practical and informative. Sobisch did criticize the lack of clarity in the inclusion criteria, though said the task of defining the far right was perhaps "an inherently impossible task". Jeffrey Kaplan noted it as tilted to more the European side of fascism, rather than the American side, and also fewer contemporary entries; he said that given when it had been published this was, however, understandable, though he noted in a shift towards American prominence in the far-right movement.
