= Far-right politics in Switzerland =

The far right in Switzerland was established in the course of the rise of fascism in Europe in the interwar period. It was a mostly marginal phenomenon in the Cold War period, excepting a surge of radical right-wing populism during the early 1970s, and it has again experienced growth alongside the right-wing Swiss People's Party since the 1990s.

== World Wars (1914–1945) ==
Switzerland was one of the least likely countries in Europe to succumb to fascism as its democracy had deep roots, it lacked a frustrated nationalism, had a high standard of living, wide distribution of property ownership and a secure economy. Despite this, before World War II a number of far right and fascist groups existed in Switzerland.

The earliest of these was Eugen Bircher's Schweizerischer Vaterländischer Verband, established in 1918. Gaining some influential members, it lasted until 1947. It was linked to the Heimatwehr, an antisemitic group established in 1925. Das Aufgebot, formed in 1933 by Jacob Lorenz, enjoyed some lower middle class support by advocating collaboration with Nazi Germany. Franz Burri advocated a similar closeness and led a variety of movements including Bund der Schweizer in Grossdeutschland (1941), Nationalsozialistischer Schweizerbund and the Nationalsozialistische Bewegung in der Schweiz (both 1942).

By 1937 there were effectively three main language-specific groups i.e. the National Front (formed 1933) for German speakers, the Union Nationale for French speakers and the Lega Nazionale Ticinese for Italian speakers, with the latter two active in Romansh areas. Of these, only the National Front managed to gain any real support. Other minor, pro-Nazi, fascist or far right groups that were active included:

- The Swiss branch of the NSDAP under Wilhelm Gustloff.
- Bund für Volk und Heimat – a Christian ultra-right group under Rudolf Grob, Samuel Haas and Walter Wili.
- Bund treuer Eidgenossen nationalsozialistischer Weltanschauung – a more avowedly pro-Nazi breakaway from the National Front under former leader Rolf Henne. This group was superseded by the Nationale Bewegung der Schweiz in 1940.
- Eidgenössische Front – an antisemitic group run by Heinrich Eugen Wechlin between 1933 and 1938.
- Eidgenössische Soziale Arbeiterpartei – a Zurich-based group active from 1936 to 1940 under Ernst Hofmann (1912-1986).
- Schweizerische Faschistische Bewegung – the movement of Benito Mussolini follower Arthur Fonjallaz. It grew from his previous groups Helvetische Aktion and the Federation Fasciste Suisse.
- Katholische Front / Front der militanten Katholiken – two pro-Nazi Roman Catholic movements led by brothers Karl and Fridolin Weder.
- Nationalsozialistische Schweizerische Arbeitspartei – a mimetic Nazi group, also known as the Volksbund, led by Major Ernst Leonhardt.

A number of pro-Nazi parties and organizations persisted well into World War II. In the course of the war, however, these pro-Nazi became very unpopular and were effectively driven underground, the National Front and its successor group the Eidgenössische Sammlung were banned in 1943.

== Cold War period (1946–1989) ==
After World War II, far-right politics re-emerged in the guise of radical right-wing populism against Überfremdung in the early 1970s, notably orchestrated by James Schwarzenbach. The first surge of right-wing populism subsided in the late 1970s, but it survived in the form of a few far-right fringe parties, the Nationale Aktion (1961–1990), a right-wing group that attracted a few neo-fascists to its ranks and the Republican Movement (1971–1990), in 1990 merged into the Schweizer Demokraten and the Freedom Party (founded 1984 as Autopartei "automobile party" in a backlash against the emerging Green movement).

A Liberal Ecologist Party also existed for a time, espousing a far right take on environmentalism that recalled ecofascism.

The end of the war saw the emergence of neo-Nazism in Switzerland, with the Volkspartei der Schweiz of Gaston-Armand Amaudruz the most important group. A Swiss Nazi Party, also existed at a minor level and during a 1970 trial evidence was heard that it maintained links to Al Fatah. François Genoud was also a member and he helped to maintain links between the group and both Hjalmar Schacht and the Popular Front for the Liberation of Palestine.

From a more neo-fascist bent, Switzerland also played host to a revived Cercle Proudhon, with the group working closely with France's Groupement de recherche et d'études pour la civilisation européenne.

== New Right (1990–present) ==
From the mid-1990s, these remaining fringe parties were mostly absorbed by the expanding Swiss People's Party (SVP), which had initiated a revival of right-wing populism from the late 1980s. The party is mainly considered to be national conservative, but it has also been variously identified as "extreme right" and "radical right-wing populist", reflecting a spectrum of ideologies present among its members. In its far right wing, it includes members such as Ulrich Schlüer, Pascal Junod, who heads a 'New Right' study group and has been linked to Holocaust denial and neo-Nazism.

The neo-Nazi and white power skinhead scene in Switzerland has seen significant growth in the 1990s and 2000s, growing from an estimated number of 200 active individuals in 1990 to 1,200 in 2005 (or from 0.003% to 0.016% of the total population). This development occurred in parallel with the increasing presence of right-wing populism due to SVP campaigns, and is reflected in the foundation of the Partei National Orientierter Schweizer in 2000, which resulted in an improved organisational structure of the neo-Nazi and white supremacist scene. The PNOS has succeeded in having a member elected to municipal governments in Langenthal in 2004 and Günsberg the following year.

The Swiss Federal Police in 2005 counted 111 right extremist incidents in 2005, estimating that the number of individuals involved in the "right extremist scene" grew by 20% to from ca. 1,000 to 1,200. At the same time, the number of loosely involved sympathisers fell from 700 to 600, so that the overall number of people involved with right extremist activism grew by some 6% from 1,700 to 1,800 people (or 0.024% of the total population). In 2019, 29 incidents related to right-wing extremism were reported in Switzerland compared to 207 of left-wing extremism (nearly 8 times more). Only one incident involved violence (compared to 115 of left-wing extremism).

Far-right activists briefly won the attention of mainstream media for disrupting the 2005 celebration of the Swiss national holiday on the Rütli Meadow. The 2006 report reports 109 right extremist incidents, of which 60 involved physical violence (55%). The size of the right extremist scene remains stable at 1,200 active individuals. As opposed to the preceding year, the police reports a significant increase in left extremist incidents, their number rising by 87 to 227, incidents involving physical violence accounting for 65%.

Bund Oberland, a group associated with the white power skinhead Blood and Honour network has also been active in the country, especially in the distribution of CDs.

A minor Swiss National Party was briefly active under the leadership of David Mulas, dissolved in 2003. This group was closely linked to the National Democratic Party of Germany.

The far-right groups further declined in the 2011 federal elections, the Swiss Democrats remaining the largest with 4,838 votes or 0.20% of the total vote, less than half than in 2007. Smaller groups participating in the elections were the Swiss Nationalist Party in Bern and Vaud (1,198 votes, 0.05%) and Eric Weber's Volksaktion in Basel-Stadt (810 votes, 0.03%).

Junge Tat is an active group since the 2020s.

== International activism ==
Switzerland's status as the world centre of neutrality has meant that it has sometimes been important in international links for fascists and neo-Nazis.

Before the Second World War, Switzerland was pivotal in the concept of fascism as an international phenomenon as it hosted the International Centre for Fascist Studies (CINEF) and the 1934 congress of the Action Committee for the Universality of Rome (CAUR). Amaudruz's New European Order represented a similar post-war phenomenon from a Swiss base, albeit on a neo-Nazism rather than Italian fascism basis.

== See also ==
- Politics of Switzerland
- Radical right
- Stiftung gegen Rassismus und Antisemitismus

== Bibliography ==
- Geden, Oliver (2006). Diskursstrategien im Rechtspopulismus: Freiheitliche Partei Österreichs und Schweizerische Volkspartei zwischen Opposition und Regierungsbeteiligung. VS Verlag. ISBN 978-3-531-15127-4.
- Skenderovic, Damir (2009). The radical right in Switzerland: continuity and change, 1945-2000. Berghahn Books. ISBN 978-1-84545-580-4.
