= Frontism =

Frontism may stand for:

- Common front, the political practice (both left and right wing) of uniting with anyone against a common enemy
- Frontist Party, a left-wing French political party in the 1930s
- Frontpartij, a Flemish nationalist movement in Belgium in the 1920s
- Frontist movement, a right wing Swiss movement in the 1930s und 1940s
- National Front (Switzerland), a fascist Swiss party in the 1930s
