= People's Party of Switzerland =

The People's Party of Switzerland may refer to:

- Swiss People's Party, a current national conservative political party
- Volkspartei der Schweiz, a defunct neo-Nazi political party
