= Das Aufgebot =

1930s Swiss political movement

Das Aufgebot ("The Call") was a political movement formed by the readers of the weekly newspaper of the same name, founded in May 1933 by Jacob Lorenz, professor of political economy at the University of Fribourg.

Like the Fronts, Das Aufgebot campaigned for a political renewal of Switzerland, though in respect of democracy and national particularities. Despite its anti-liberal, anti-capitalist, and antisemitic tendencies, it kept its distance from fascism and National Socialism. Faithful to the social doctrine of the Catholic Church, it advocated corporatism in economic matters. Lorenz was the first to publicly demand a total revision of the Federal Constitution and allied himself with the Fronts to that end; the initiative was, however, rejected by the electorate in 1935.

In 1936, the movement absorbed Neue Schweiz, another organization of corporatist orientation.

Originally conceived as a mass movement, then from 1934 as an elite one, the organization rapidly lost importance, while the newspaper continued until the end of 1957.

== Bibliography ==
=== Sources ===
- J. Lorenz, Korporativer Aufbau, 1933.
- Das Aufgebot, 1933–1957.

=== Literature ===
- P. Stadler, "Die Diskussion um eine Totalrevision der Schweizerischen Bundesverfassung 1933–1935", in Schweizerische Zeitschrift für Geschichte, 19, 1969, pp. 75–169.
- A. Mattioli, ed., Intellektuelle von rechts, 1995, pp. 219–238.
