= Neue Schweiz =

1930s Swiss national-conservative movement

Neue Schweiz ("New Switzerland"; in French Suisse nouvelle) was a national-conservative renewal movement founded by several cantonal secretaries of the trades and crafts during the "spring of the Fronts" of 1933.

Like the journal of the same name, the movement called for the abandonment of liberalism in favor of a corporatist economic order and a state-sanctioned associational protectionism for the benefit of the artisan and commercial middle class, then in economic difficulty. Its only political success was the enactment in 1933 of a ban on the opening or expansion of department stores and large wholesalers, intended to protect retail trade; the ban was progressively relaxed and finally abolished in 1945. Led by Fritz Joss, a member of the National Council and of the Bernese cantonal executive, the movement reached its peak in 1934 with around 20,000 members, mostly in German-speaking Switzerland. Its decline began when the trades-and-crafts officials withdrew from its governing bodies, and in 1936 it was absorbed into Das Aufgebot, another organization of corporatist orientation.

== Bibliography ==
- M. Trossmann, Der Schweizerische Gewerbeverband in der Wirtschaftskrise der dreissiger Jahre, licentiate thesis, Zurich, 1980, pp. 105–134.
- K. Angst, Von der "alten" zur "neuen" Gewerbepolitik, 1992, pp. 37–88, 134–152.
