= Max Keller =

Max Keller may refer to:

- Max Leo Keller (1897–1956), Swiss engineer and politician
- Max A. Keller (born 1943), American film and television producer
- Max E. Keller (born 1947), Swiss composer, jazz pianist and improvising musician
