= Jakob Schaffner =

Swiss novelist (1875–1944)

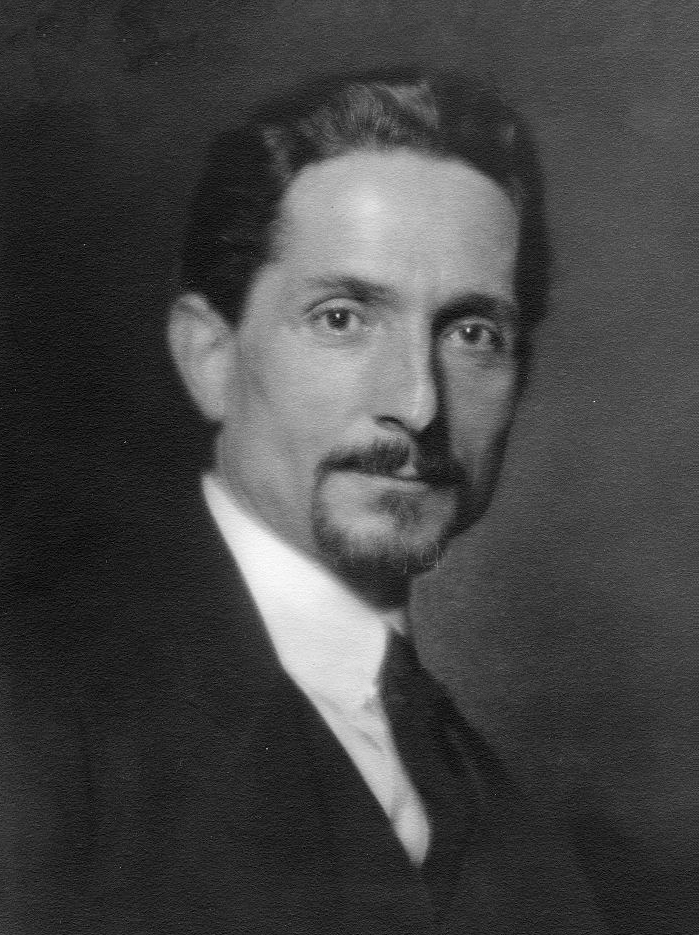
Jakob Schaffner c. 1920.

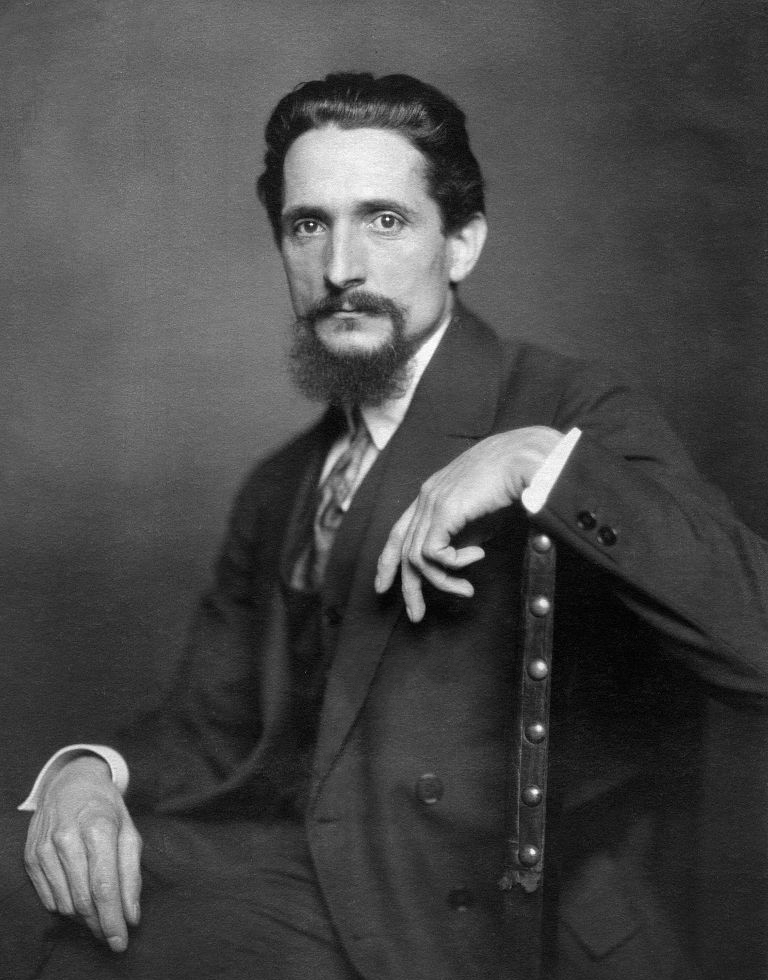
Jakob Schaffner c. 1920.

Jakob Schaffner (14 November 1875 – 23 September 1944) was a leading Swiss novelist who became a supporter of Nazism.

== Emergence as a writer ==
Born on 14 November 1875 in Basel, both his father and his mother, a native of the State of Baden, died when he was young, leaving him to be reared in an orphanage. His early experiences inspired his most celebrated novel Johannes (sometimes known as Roman einer Jugend), which was published in 1922 and was a semi-autobiographical story of life in an orphanage. He initially worked as a shoemaker before turning to writing and held a number of other jobs throughout his life whilst an author. As a young shoemaker Schaffner travelled extensively as a journeyman in the Netherlands, Belgium and France, which heavily influenced his later writing, much of which was concerned with travel.

He studied at the University of Basel, and wrote his early works in Basel. In his very early days Schaffner was sympathetic to communism but he would switch at an early age to nationalism.

In 1912, Schaffner moved to Charlottenburg, near Berlin, Germany, after marrying a German woman and was driven by his German ethnic identity. His native spoken tongue was the Alemannic German dialect but seeking to rid himself of regional peculiarities and become what he described as an "all-German" he consciously adopted north German forms and expressions in his writing. He was strongly critical not only of Judaism but also of Christianity, dismissing the Bible as "a foreign collection of texts".

== Far right activity ==
He later returned to Switzerland and from 1936 to 1938 was active on behalf of the National Front, leaving the movement along with Rolf Henne and Hans Oehler. For a time Schaffner was a member of the Bund Treuer Eidgenossen Nationalsozialistischer Weltanschauung, a pro-Nazism group established by Henne, Oehler and others on the extreme wing of the National Front. Schaffner had initially been a sceptic about Nazism but soon became a strong supporter of Adolf Hitler, feeling that he could spearhead a renovation of Europe.

During the Second World War, Schaffner returned to live in Germany. He joined the Nazi Party and worked as a propagandist for Joseph Goebbels. He rarely returned to Switzerland, except for a meeting with cabinet minister Marcel Pilet-Golaz in 1940 alongside Ernst Hofmann and Max Leo Keller, two leading members of the recently established Swiss Nazi movement, the National Movement of Switzerland.

Schaffner was killed in 1944 during an air raid on Strasbourg and was buried in his hometown Buus in September 1944. Having formerly been widely regarded as a writer, his reputation in German-speaking literary circles was damaged significantly after the war due to his support for Nazism.

== Literary works ==
- Irrfahrten (Wanderings) 1905
- Die Laterne und andere Novellen (The Lantern and other novellas) 1907
- Konrad Pilater 1910, a story of a rather whimsical journeyman shoemaker, embodying scenes of Schaffner's boyhood as a shoemaker
- Der Bote Gottes (The Messenger of God) 1911
- Die goldene Fratze (The Golden Fratze – a German term for a distorted or ugly face or grimace) 1912
- Die Irrfahrten des Jonathan Bregger (The Wanderings of Jonathan Bregger) 1912, a new edition of Irrfahrten of 1905
- "The Iron Idol,” an English translation of one of his stories, appears in Kuno Francke, ed., German Classics, v. 19, New York, 1914
- Die Weisheit der Liebe (The Wisdom of Love) 1919
- Konrad Pilater (new version) 1922
- Johannes 1922
- Brüder (Brothers) 1925
- Das grosse Erlebnis (The Grand Experience) 1926
- Die Jünglingszeit des Johannes Schattenhold (The Young Manhood of Johannes Schattenhold) 1930 (sequel to Johannes)
- Eine deutsche Wanderschaft (A German Journey) 1933 (third Johannes book)
- Offenbarung in deutscher Landschaft. Eine Sommerfahrt (Revealing in German Landscape – A Summer Journey) 1934
- Berge, Ströme und Städte. Eine schweizerische Heimatschau (Mountains, Rivers and Cities – A Swiss Homeland Show) 1938
- Kampf und Reise (Struggle and Journey) 1939 (final part of Johannes tetralogy)
