= Corporatism in Switzerland =

Political and economic doctrine

Corporatism in Switzerland was a political and economic doctrine advocating for corporatism as a "third way" between unfettered capitalism and a socialism that exalted class conflict. It sought a solution to the social question, which had become pressing from the 1870s, in the organization of professions and in the modernization of the guilds of the Ancien Régime, seen as symbols of an ancestral harmony broken by the French Revolution. Oriented toward the past and the nation, the doctrine took on many strands and found echoes in the papal encyclicals Rerum novarum (1891) of Leo XIII and Quadragesimo anno (1931) of Pius XI (Christian-social movement).

Whereas the totalitarian states—Fascist Italy, Salazarist Portugal, and Francoist Spain—applied it in the form of a state corporatism that authoritatively created and controlled corporative bodies, the associational corporatism proposed in Switzerland sought to leave occupational groups free to organize themselves.

== Origins and ideology ==
In Switzerland, corporatism first appeared in the 1880s, but its real development came in the interwar period. Opposed to parliamentary democracy, it called into question the foundations of the rational state created in 1848, the work of the Radicals. It advocated a society removed from universal suffrage—regarded as an illusion—and a state in which all social strata would feel integrated rather than patronized. The doctrine entered Switzerland through lay associations strongly supervised by the clergy. Its main spokesman, the Fribourg priest André Savoy, focused above all on organizing workers, and recorded notable progress between 1920 and 1925 following the failure of the general strike of 1918.

Nostalgic for the Switzerland of before 1798, corporatism, partitioned into impermeable orders and guaranteeing a highly idealized social cohesion, called for the limitation of free competition through planning coordinated not by the state but by the corporations, and for the rejection of parliamentary institutions, which it judged a source of chaos. It also took a stand against the centralizing interventionism of the Confederation and the advance of the welfare state, which it saw as a factor of division. Anti-capitalist and anti-socialist, corporatism wanted reconciliation rather than class struggle, collaboration between capital and labor, and the defense of the middle classes. Federalist, and faithful to the traditional image of an authentically democratic primitive Switzerland, it dreamed of an arbitrating state supported by the constituted bodies of society—commune, family, profession, Church, nation—as the sole pillars of national unity: in short, an organic form of direct democracy.

== Employers and the organization of capitalism ==
Employers in turn came to consider corporatism as a remedy for democracy. Concerned to restore the economy's efficiency in increasingly vigorous competition, small and large bosses alike initially expected corporatism to deliver a reform of the state that would shield them from the interventions of a parliament colonized by political parties. A sense of order and respect for hierarchies brought them together under the corporatist label. With the help of trade unions, an organization of capitalism took shape, marked by the creation in 1919 of the Bureau industriel suisse (from 1927 known as Schweizerischen Zentrale für Handelsförderung (French: Office suisse d'expansion commerciale, OSEC)), charged with promoting Swiss production, and by the institutionalization of relations between the peak economic associations and the state. This alliance between industry and the crafts, sealed by the wish to bypass parliament in resolving economic questions, did not survive the crisis of the 1930s.

== Diffusion in the 1920s and 1930s ==
In the 1920s, corporatism won over broad circles. In 1924 the Amis de la corporation were founded and spread to many cantons, notably in French-speaking Switzerland. Vaud and Geneva produced corporative federations; Fribourg adopted a law on corporations, which, however, never came into force. In 1933 the Union corporative suisse was set up to rally German-speaking Switzerland, which had its own centers of activity, particularly in St. Gallen. As evidence of the deep disarray of the democratic system, many Radical and Liberal politicians saw in an avowedly political corporatism a structure capable of saving the country. At the federal level, the Swiss Union of Arts and Crafts (German: Schweizerische Gewerbeverband; French: Union suisse des arts et métiers, USAM) drew closer to corporatist theses, as did groupings seeking a renewal of Switzerland in such a framework, such as Neue Schweiz. However, only the Catholic Conservative Party adopted corporatism as its program; its doctrine, conceptualized by Jacob Lorenz, matched the party's wish to transcend the confrontation between liberalism and socialism.

== The 1935 constitutional initiative ==
Corporatist fervor culminated in 1934 with the launch of a popular initiative demanding the revision of the Federal Constitution in a corporatist direction: the National Council, as the representative of public-law corporations, would be designated by the communal executives in each canton rather than by the people. The initiative was submitted in September 1934 with 78,050 signatures, supported by the Fronts that had appeared from 1933, some of them clearly fascist-leaning.

Although corporatists opposed both a corporatism understood as a revival of medieval guilds and a Ständestaat of the kind demanded by the fascists, they could not dispel the major ambiguity that weighed on their ideal: the proximity of several of their circles to nationalist or fascist groups. The avowed attraction that the Italian system devised by Mussolini exerted on some of their theorists, even democratic ones, and the calls for a strong, anti-democratic state frequently heard from corporatists such as those of the Ligue vaudoise, underlined the very diverse readings to which political corporatism lent itself, always poised between democratic renewal and authoritarianism.

The initiative envisaged a parliament composed of the principal bodies of society—communes, churches, and workers' and employers' unions—respecting popular rights and organizing the economy so that it could develop harmoniously. It failed in the popular vote of September 1935: with 60% turnout, 196,135 voted yes and 511,578 no.

In the cantons, two draft laws on corporations were drawn up in Fribourg in 1933 and 1934, but never entered into force.

== Decline and legacy ==
The shift of trade unionists toward corporatism, especially after the conclusion of the labor peace agreement in July 1937, and the consolidation of corporatism as an integral part of the climate of Spiritual National Defense that took hold in Switzerland on the eve of the war, reinforced its national vocation as a bulwark against foreign influences. Yet the doctrine exhausted itself: the rejection of the 1935 initiative marked the beginning of its decline. The discredit inflicted on it by fascism, the failure of employer–worker unity within the corporations from 1940, and the failure of a further constitutional revision in 1942 (Stalder Initiative) ruined its hopes.

In Geneva the Fédération des syndicats patronaux (1928; Fédération romande des syndicats patronaux from 1983), and in the canton of Vaud the Groupements patronaux of the Fédération vaudoise des corporations (1940; Groupements patronaux vaudois from 1947; Fédération patronale vaudoise from 1995), are the heirs of the "third way".

In 1942, the USAM moved into the liberal camp, preferring economic freedom to increasingly uncertain state support. Postwar prosperity highlighted the success of an organized capitalism that resulted in the limitation of competition, the introduction of collective labor agreements, the extension of the welfare state, and the triumph of labor peace. This reorganization of the liberal economy amounted to an attempt at synthesis transcending the antagonisms that had erupted in society in the second half of the 19th century. In this respect corporatism certainly exerted an influence and brought new ideas, but it did not itself set in motion the development observed from 1945.

== Bibliography ==
- R. Ruffieux, Le mouvement chrétien-social en Suisse romande, 1969.
- Q. Weber, Korporatismus statt Sozialismus, 1989.
- K. Angst, Von der "alten" zur "neuen" Gewerbepolitik, 1992.
- Ph. Maspoli, Le corporatisme et la droite en Suisse romande, 1993.
- Ch. Werner, Für Wirtschaft und Vaterland, 2000.
- J.-F. Cavin, ed., Liberté économique et responsabilité sociale: des corporations au mondialisme, 2004.
