= Robert van Genechten =

Dutch politician

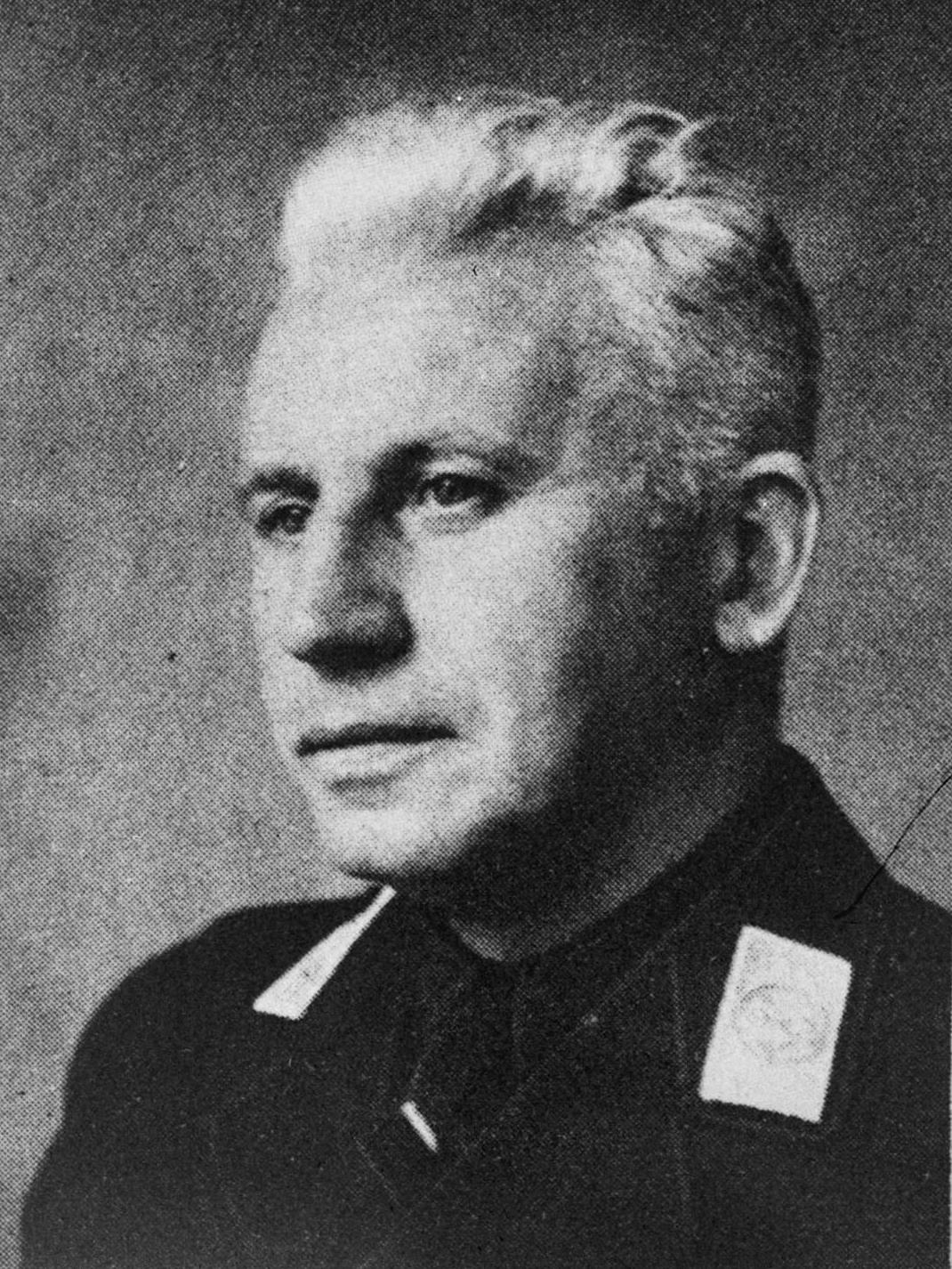
- Robert van Genechten (1940)

Solicitor-General to the Court of Justice in The Hague

Minister for Education, Arts and Science

Commissioner for South Holland

Personal details
- Born: 25 October 1895 Antwerp, Belgium
- Died: 13 December 1945 (aged 50) Scheveningen, Netherlands
- Party: National Socialist Movement in the Netherlands
- Education: University of Ghent

Robert van Genechten (25 October 1895 – 13 December 1945) was a Belgian-born Dutch politician, writer, Nazi sympathizer, and a leading collaborator during the German occupation of the Netherlands.

== Early years ==
Van Genechten was born in Antwerp and studied jurisprudence at the University of Ghent.

After the Imperial German forces invaded Belgium in the Great War, Van Genechten wasted no time in collaborating with the occupying German forces. After the armistice and end of the war, he fled to the Netherlands, receiving an eight-year prison sentence in absentia. In the Netherlands, he made a living as a lawyer and a teacher at Utrecht University, taking Dutch citizenship on 14 June 1930.

== Return ==
When the statute of limitations ran out on van Genechten's conviction in Belgium he returned to his native country, but later returned to the Netherlands to enter politics. Joining the National Socialist Movement in the Netherlands in 1934, he quickly rose through the party ranks, at one time acting as spokesman on education, and from 1938, editor-in-chief of Nieuw Nederland. As a regular writer on the rightwing paper, he expounded at length on his hatred of rationalism and humanism.

In 1937, he wrote a series of Nazi propaganda articles, Van den vos Reynaerde, which was a re-interpretation of the Reynard cycle attacking Jews. The articles went on to become a book in 1941, and an animated cartoon in 1943. Given his pro-Nazi stance, he was interned by the Dutch government in Hoorn prison during the 1940 invasion.

== Under the Nazis ==
His fortunes changed once the Nazis took control, and he was released from jail to take a role as the appointed Solicitor-General to the Court of Justice in The Hague, where he presided over "peace courts" introduced by Arthur Seyss-Inquart. For a time he was also Minister for Education, Arts, and Science in Anton Mussert's proposed cabinet, but he never took power as the Germans refused to devolve power to the NSB and thus the cabinet never took office.

As the occupation of the Netherlands wore on, he fell out of favor with the Germans, and in February 1943 was given the new role of Commissioner for South Holland, a demotion. Reacting badly to his reduced role, he attempted suicide, an act that saw him removed from all positions because of his perceived unstable nature.

== Arrest and suicide ==
After the liberation of the Netherlands by Canadian forces, he was arrested and sentenced to death by the Special Court. He committed suicide by hanging himself in his prison cell before the sentence could be carried out.

== See also ==
- List of people who died by suicide by hanging

== Bibliography ==
Notes

References

- David Littlejohn (1972). The Patriotic Traitors (April 10, 1972 ed.). William Heinemann Ltd. ISBN 0-434-42725-X. - Total pages: 400
- Philip Rees (1990). Biographical Dictionary of the Extreme Right Since 1890 (February 1991 ed.). Simon & Schuster. ISBN 0-13-089301-3. - Total pages: 422
