= René Binet (neo-fascist) =

French Trotskyist and neo-fascist activist

- Born: 16 October 1913; Darnétal, France
- Died: 16 October 1957 (aged 44); Pontoise, France
- Occupation: Journalist
- Known for: Antisemitic and neo-fascist writer and activist
- Political party: Internationalist Communist Party; Republican Party for Popular Unity; New European Order

René Binet (16 October 1913 – 16 October 1957) was a French fascist political activist. Initially a Trotskyist in the 1930s, he espoused fascism during World War II and joined the SS Charlemagne Division. Soon after the end of the war, Binet became involved in numerous neo-fascist and white supremacist publications and parties. He wrote the 1950 book Théorie du racisme (Theory of Racism), deemed influential on the European far-right at large. Binet died in a car accident in 1957, aged 44.

According to scholar Nicolas Lebourg, "Binet’s openly advertised racialism has paved the way to an anti-colonialist and anti-immigrant ethnopluralism celebrated by the New Right and then the Identitarians. Abandoning classic nationalism and Aryanism for the notion of a 'white world', Binet clearly outlined the forthcoming themes of 'white genocide' and the ZOG (Zionist Occupation Government)."

== Biography ==
=== Early life and communist activism ===
René Valentin Binet was born on 16 October 1913 in Darnétal, Seine-Maritime. He became a communist sympathizer in high school after a trip to the Soviet Union. Aged 16 in 1930, Binet joined the French Communist Youth and became the secretary of its local Le Havre section, before getting expelled from that group in 1934 after he supported Jacques Doriot's ideas of "common front" (front unique).

Binet then moved towards the Fourth International, joining Pierre Frank and Raymond Molinier around the journal La Commune. In March 1936, he became a founding member of the Internationalist Communist Party (PCI) along with Frank and Molinier, and was elected to the party's Central Committee. Binet was also a member of the Le Havre employees trade union's council, but got expelled in February 1937 after he refused to follow the internal refereeing procedure.

When the PCI was dissolved in December 1938 in order to merge into the Workers and Peasants' Socialist Party (POSP), Binet withdrew from the group and continued his own journal, Le Prolétaire du Havre. His group sent an observer to the 3rd congress of the Internationalist Workers Party (POI) in January 1939, a rival organization of the PCI led by Pierre Naville and Jean Rous. In August 1939, Binet was arrested for distributing pacifist propaganda. He wrote in his memoirs that he felt hatred for the Soviet Union and the Jews during the period 1934–1939.

=== World War II ===
Enlisted in the French army in May 1940, Binet was soon taken as a prisoner-of-war by the Germans. During the war, he moved away from his communist stance to become an open supporter of Nazism. In 1943, he enrolled in Nazi Germany's Compulsory Work Service. In April of the same year, the Internationalist Communist Committee published a "warning" about Binet, dismissing him as a traitor to the Trotskyist cause. In February 1944, he joined the Legion of French Volunteers Against Bolshevism (LVF), then served as a staff sergeant within the SS Charlemagne Division.

=== Post-war activism ===
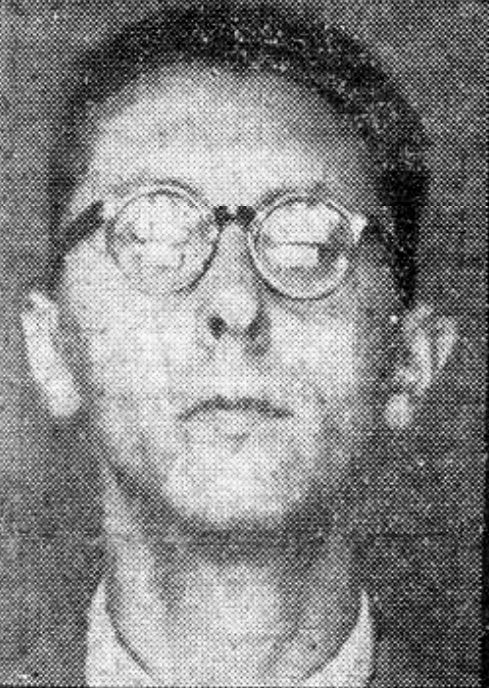
Binet in October 1946

On 3 May 1945, claiming to be an escapee from German camps, Binet surrendered to the Americans and was repatriated to France. He spent 6 months in a French prison for serving in the German military, then returned to political activism. His wife Marie-Angèle Lamisse created a support group for former prisoners which served as the basis of the first organization Binet founded in 1945, the Republican Party for Popular Unity (PRUP). The group denounced "Slavic and American imperialism" and the cultural influence of the Vatican, adopted the slogan "France for the Real French!", and tried to recruit leftists on radical nationalist slogans. According to scholar James G. Shields, the PRUP followed "an ideological hotchpotch mixing nationalism with Europeanism and socialist themes with collaborationist sympathies." The party, which militated "against the massive arrival of North African workers", had around 150 members when it joined forces with the Rassemblement Travailliste Français to contest the 1947 municipal elections. Following an electoral defeat, Binet converted the PRUP into the Mouvement socialiste d'unité française (MSUF) in 1948.

The MSUF advocated the emergence of a Franco-German union which, according to them, was "alone capable of saving the white race from the invasion of the Negroes." Its periodical L'Unité led a campaign against the Épuration of Nazi collaborators and demanded the departure of Arabs from France to stop an alleged "African invasion". The party, which had 250 members at most, obtained financial aid from the Argentinian embassy and maintained relations with the Egyptian embassy, the Arab League and the Bruderschaft. The MSUF was banned by the French authorities in March 1949.

Binet founded the bulletin Le Drapeau Noir to defend "the demands of the soldiers of the East", that is former Waffen-SS and LVF members. His sympathizers belonged to the Front Noir, a clandestine organization that contemplated armed struggle in order to build a "new Europe" relying on fascism. The organization had linked with other neo-fascist groups abroad via a Front Noir International and a Secours Noir International, two organizations that acted as an "embryonic" and "ephemeral" transnational union of fascist activists according to political scientist Jean-Paul Gautier. Binet also co-founded with fascist writer Saint-Loup the newspaper Combattant européen in March 1946, which claimed to fight the "colonization of Europe" by "negroes" and "Mongols" and advocated the union of former communist resistance fighters and the Waffen-SS in order to build "the European nation".

From 1949 to 1952, Binet published two bulletins: L'Étincelle, which saw an irregular publication, and Sentinelle, where one could read the contributions of Jean-André Faucher, Karl-Heinz Priester or Gaston-Armand Amaudruz. In Sentinelle, Binet advocated his views on "national socialism" and "scientific racism" while promoting the establishment of a "fascist international".

=== New European Order ===
In July 1950, Binet launched the magazine Le Nouveau Prométhée, which presented itself as "national-progressist" and tried to appear more mainstream, and where he developed his theories on "biological realism". The text published in the first issue was adapted the same year as a brochure entitled Théorie du racisme in order to serve as a doctrinal pamphlet advocating racial segregation. The magazine disappeared after one year of existence in 1951. The same year, Binet founded the group Nation and Progress, which later inspired the Nationalist Movement of Progress and Nouvelle Droite leaders. Binet also became close to Maurice Bardèche and the Comité National Français ('French National Committee'), a section of the European Social Movement (ESB). In 1951, he went to Malmö with Bardèche and attended the meeting that saw the formation of the ESB, a neo-fascist alliance set up to bring together nationalists from all over Europe.

However, Binet soon broke from the new group which he felt did not go far enough in terms of racialism and anti-communism, and joined instead Amaudruz in establishing the Zurich-based New European Order (NEO) as a more radical alternative in 1951. The group called at its founding for a "European racial policy" in order to improve the European gene pool via eugenicist interventions and control of ethnic inter-marriages. Binet aimed at federating the nationalists of Europe – from former Waffen-SS members to former resistance fighter – against what he called the Russo-American occupation of the continent by "niggers", "Mongols" and "Jews".

=== Later life and death ===
In the later years of his life, Binet worked as a librarian, running the small publishing house Comptoir National du Livre, then led a property development company called Baticoop. He died in a car accident on 16 October 1957 in Pontoise, the day of his 44th birthday. Binet was buried in a mass grave until one of his followers bought him a burial place in 1971.

Noted for his domineering personality, Binet was not always popular among his far right colleagues, leading to allegations that some of them may have arranged his death. Fellow fascist writer Maurice Bardèche described him as a "fascist of the puritan type who spends his life founding parties and publishing roneotyped newspapers".

== Views and influence ==
Binet advocated the "inequality of the human races" and "social racism", calling for the "purification of the French race of the elements which pollute it". His 1950 book Théorie du racisme ('Theory on racism') promotes the concept of "biological realism", that is the establishment of individual and racial inequalities based upon pseudo-scientific observations. Binet argued that "interbreeding capitalism" (capitalisme métisseur) aimed at creating a "uniform inhumanity" (barbarie uniforme), and that only "a true socialism" could "achieve race liberation" through the "absolute segregation at both global and national level." In Contribution à une éthique raciste ('Contribution to a racist ethics'), published posthumously in 1975, Binet defended the "superiority of the European man and the white race" and advocated a "racist revolution" to implement a "dictatorship of races".

Binet's ideas, characterized by a worldwide "biological-cultural deal" where each group would remain sovereign in its own region, foreshadowed both the racialism of Europe-Action (1963–1966) and the ethno-pluralism of GRECE (1968–present). Scholars have also linked Binet's concept of "interbreeding capitalism" with Renaud Camus' idea of "global replacism" – a "replaceable human, without any national, ethnic or cultural specificity" –, which forms the foundation of his Great Replacement conspiracy theory.

== Works ==
- Théorie du racisme, 1950.
- L'Évolution, l'homme, la race, 1952.
- Socialisme national contre marxisme, 1953; published again in 1978 with a preface by Gaston-Armand Amaudruz.
- Contribution à une éthique raciste, 1975; with a preface by Amaudruz.
