= Emil Sonderegger =

Swiss military officer (1868–1934)

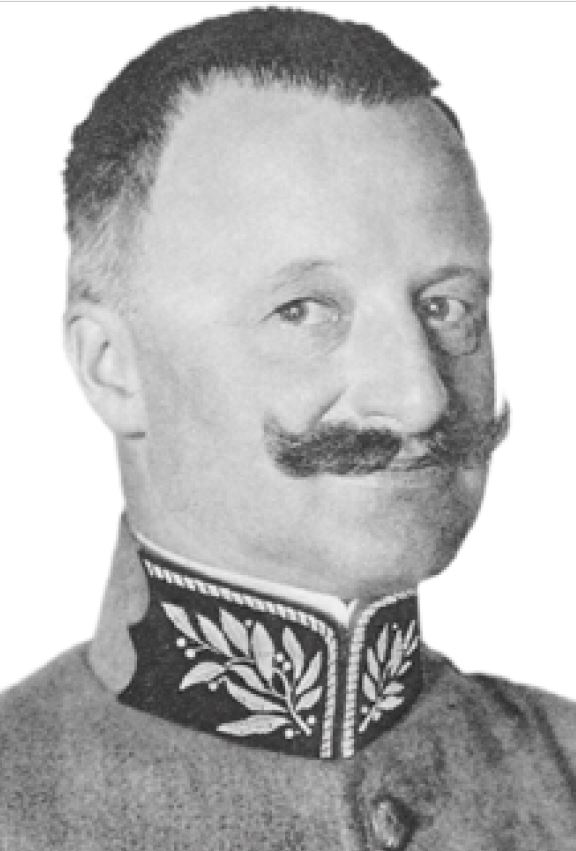
Emil Sonderegger

Emil Sonderegger (born 28 November 1868 in Herisau – died 15 July 1934) was a Swiss military officer who later became involved in the country's far right political scene.

The son of leading embroidery businessman, Sonderegger initially worked for the export branch of his father's company, travelling extensively and developing strong language skills as a result. Eventually, however, Sonderegger left the family business to follow a career in the Swiss Army, rising to artillery lieutenant by 1888. His military career blossomed and he was commanding a brigade by 1916 and the 4th Division by 1918. Leading his division to suppress the general strike in Zurich in November of that year, he gained strong approval from conservatives who dubbed him the "saviour of the Fatherland". Under the direction of Ulrich Wille, Sonderegger had positioned his troops throughout Zurich in anticipation of demonstrations by communists on November 10 1918 in commemoration of the October Revolution. He banned any communist demonstrations and although some defied the ban the small group was quickly routed by Sonderegger's troops after a minor skirmish. Promoted to the Swiss General Staff in 1920 he left the army in 1923 in protest over plans to restructure the country's military.

He went on to work for Schweizerische Industriegesellschaft Neuhausen and an arms manufacturer, as well as conducting a lecture tour of China. As an arms trader he co-operated closely with Max Bauer, who secured a number of lucrative contracts for Sonderegger's companies in return for Sonderegger becoming involved in the covert rearmament of Germany. Turning his business and military mind to politics, he became a strong opponent of parliamentary democracy, likening it to the chaos of a stock exchange when a better system would be the corporation model of an amalgamated executive and legislature kept in check by plebiscite. He also supported enterprise in economics, rather than state intervention.

He became a keen reader of the Schweizerische Monatshefte and its editor Hans Oehler gained something of a coup in 1933 when he convinced the national hero to join the National Front. Using his military skills, he played a leading role in transforming the front from a discussion group into a force in street politics, although he became disillusioned with the inertia of the Front and in 1933 left the group with Ernst Leonhardt to form the Volksbund. By February of the following year Sonderegger and Leonhardt had split, with Sonderegger forming his own Volksfront. He died later that same year, with his group absorbed by the Eidgenössische Front.
