= Eidgenössische Sammlung =

Swiss Nazi political party

Eidgenössische Sammlung (German; literally "Confederate Collection") was one of several local names of a Swiss political party, founded in 1940 by Robert Tobler as a successor to the recently dissolved National Front.

The party demanded an adjustment in Swiss policy to favour the Axis powers. This was particularly important as, after June 1940, the country was surrounded by fascist and Nazi states. It was open in its loyalty towards Nazi Germany.

The Eidgenössiche Sammlung was closely supervised by the state because of its origins and so could not develop freely. In 1943, the police finally cracked down on the group and it was outlawed along with all of its sub-organisations as part of a wider government initiative against the National Front and its offshoots.
