= Franz Burri =

- Burri (right) during his trial (April 1948)
- Born: 26 October 1901; Lucerne, Switzerland
- Died: 24 July 1987 (aged 85); Entlebuch, Switzerland
- Citizenship: Swiss, German
- Known for: Nazi propagandist
- Political party: Bund der Schweizer in Grossdeutschland, National Movement of Switzerland, Nationalsozialistischer Schweizerbund

Franz Burri (26 October 1901 – 24 July 1987) was a Swiss political figure who, from his base in Germany, became the leading disseminator of Nazi propaganda in the country. The media labeled him the "Helvetic Goebbels".

== Background and career ==
Born in Lucerne to a half-German working-class family, Burri was an early supporter of National Socialism and frequently visited Nazi Germany during the 1930s. He came to full-time activism in 1941 by forming his own Bund der Schweizer in Grossdeutschland (League of the Swiss in Greater Germany), calling for a very close relationship between his country and Nazi Germany. Known for his crude language and his fondness for wearing the brown uniform of the Sturmabteilung, his hopes for a career in the SS were dashed when Reinhard Heydrich deemed him unsuitable. Also involved in the larger National Movement of Switzerland, Burri quit this organisation after the rejection of his SS application in 1941 to set up his own Nationalsozialistischer Schweizerbund (NSSB), although he moved to Germany full-time soon after this and ran a sister group, the Nationalsozialistische Bewegung in der Schweiz, from there. Both of the groups were funded directly by Germany.

Burri operated in Austria until 1934, when he was deported for pro-Nazi activities. He returned to Switzerland, where he remained until 1938. He came back to Austria after the Anschluss.

== World War II and treason trial ==
After moving to Germany, Burri took up his role as the leading producer of Nazi propaganda for the Swiss market. From his base in Frankfurt, he produced the International Presseagentur, a newspaper funded by the Nazis. Within its pages Burri and his fellow writers, notably his closest ally and NSSB chief Ernst Leonhardt, called for a Union of the German Peoples in which Switzerland would be absorbed into the Third Reich in the same way that Austria had been. Having taken up German citizenship, he was symbolically stripped of his Swiss status in 1943.

Starting in 1942, Burri started a leaflet agitation campaign against Switzerland. Helpers smuggled the leaflets into the country and distributed them. In 1943, he was sentenced to six months in prison in absentia for "attacks on the independence of Switzerland". In 1944, leaflets by Burri described General Henri Guisan, who'd mobilized Swiss forces for a potential invasion by Germany, as a "traitor", "mercenary of Jews and liar", and "miserable idiot". He called for the establishment for a "Swiss Legion" within the Waffen-SS, as well as a German invasion of Switzerland. In response, a Swiss court sentenced Burri to 7 years in prison in absentia.

On 11 December 1945, Burri was arrested by American occupation authorities in Allied-occupied Austria. In 1946, he was extradited to Switzerland, where he was put on trial for treason. Witnesses testified that he aspired to serve as Gauleiter of Switzerland following its incorporation into Nazi Germany. The prosecution presented German files which showed that in 1941, Burri had sent a letter to Heinrich Himmler discussing the importance of a Nazi coup in Switzerland. Burri said he and his colleagues were "ready for action at any time" and had a paramilitary of 1,800 men prepared for deployment in all German-speaking Swiss cantons. The documents were found by a Swiss expatriate working as an archivist for the Americans in the Nuremberg trials, who'd read about the trial in the newspapers. Burri himself used the proceedings as an opportunity to justify his actions to the court. He claimed his arrest and extradition by the Americans constituted a kidnapping in violation of international law and that he was being punished for his political beliefs. In his closing speech, Burri insisted that he'd merely lost his way in his "fight for a nationally strengthened and socialist Europe."

"I was only concerned with personal goals, with ambitions. My fight was not an end in itself. It served an idea that I still feel is right today - I fought for it like everyone else fights for their ideas. I had neither material reasons nor advantages in doing so. Our crusade flag against Bolshevism is now carried by the USA ..., democratic Switzerland is becoming a national social democracy."

In 1949, he was found guilty and sentenced to 20 years in prison. Following the verdict, Burri made a statement affirming his beliefs.

"My fight was not an end in itself. It served an idea that I still think is correct today. You cannot divide the sons of a people into villains and saints. They only divide based on opinions. Part is truth and part is error."

== Post-war ==
Burri was released from prison in 1959, after which he moved to Germany. He continued to support Nazism for the rest of his life and wrote for far-right publications. In one letter, he wrote that, "One day, I, too, will be rehabilitated by history." In his memoirs, Burri said he viewed other right-wing extremists who'd moderated their views after World War II to increase their public appeal as cowards.

"I refused to convert in 1945 in a cowardly and characterless manner in order to have possible advantages... I only knew and know two cards: attitude and the courage to make sacrifices."

Burri returned to Switzerland before his death in 1987.
