= Aleksandar Tsankov Staliyski =

Bulgarian politician

- Александър Цанков Сталийски
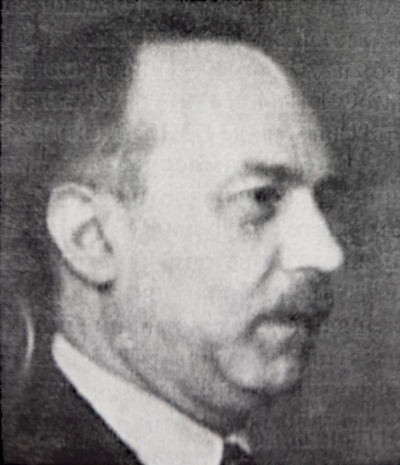
- Born: 28 August 1893; Vidin, Kingdom of Bulgaria
- Died: 2 February 1945 (aged 51); Sofia, Bulgaria
- Cause of death: Executed
- Education: Doctorate in constitutional law
- Alma mater: Sofia University; University of Würzburg
- Occupation: Lawyer
- Known for: Politician
- Notable work: Vasrajdane
- Title: Minister of Justice
- Term: 12 June 1944 - 2 September 1944
- Predecessor: Russi Rustev
- Political party: Democratic Party; Democratic Alliance; National Fascist Union
- Criminal charge: Collaborationism
- Criminal penalty: Execution
- Children: Aleksandar Aleksandrov (son)

Aleksandar Tsankov Staliyski (Bulgarian: Александър Цанков Сталийски) (28 August 1893 – 2 February 1945) was a Bulgarian far right politician active before and during the Second World War. He briefly served as a minister in the final pro-Axis powers cabinet.

== Early years ==
Staliyski was born in Vidin, the son of the founder of a leading academic who was the founder of the Bulgarian Union of Academics. Following in the family tradition, he studied law at Sofia University.

Staliyski interrupted his academic pursuits to volunteer for service during both the Balkan Wars and the First World War. However, in 1923 he successfully completed his doctorate in constitutional law at the University of Würzburg in Germany. Having completed his studies he worked as a lawyer in Sofia between 1928 and 1944.

== Politics ==
Staliyski first entered politics as a member of Aleksandar Malinov's Democratic Party before switching to the Democratic Alliance of Aleksandar Tsankov after the 1923 coup. It was for this group that he served as a deputy in the National Assembly of Bulgaria from 1923 to 1928.

Staliyski became attracted to the growing fascist movements elsewhere in Europe and in 1931 he abandoned his support of Tsankov, who would later convert to fascism himself, and instead set up his own National Fascist Union. The new group soon attracted subsidies from Fascist Italy, allowing Staliyski to produce his own journal Vasrajdane. Indeed, he gained a strong reputation as a writer of fascist propaganda with his book on the fascist corporate state a notable success that was even translated into German. Much of his fascism was however mimetic of the Italian model rather than the German. Preaching a form of fascism that was particularly critical of democracy, communism and freemasonry, he had attracted 20,000 followers by May 1934, all dressed in the movement's green jacket uniforms.

A number of other fascist movements had grown up since the arrival of Staliyski's and represented a threat to the position of King Boris. As such the king outlawed a number of these groups, including the National Fascist Union and so Staliyski disappeared from political life.

== Return to politics ==
On 1 June 1944, with Bulgaria on the verge of defeat Ivan Ivanov Bagryanov formed a right-wing administration that included a number of politicians active in the old fascist movements. Staliyski became one of that number on 12 June 1944 when he replaced Russi Rustev as Minister of Justice. However given that Bulgaria was already under attack by the Soviet Union his membership of the cabinet proved short-lived as he remained in his ministry until 2 September 1944. He was not included in the last-ditch cabinet of Konstantin Muraviev and then was arrested following the coup of 9 September 1944. Brought before the People's Court, Staliyski was condemned to death for collaborationism. He was one of 92 collaborators executed in Sofia on the same day.

Staliyski's son Aleksandar Aleksandrov (1925–2004) entered politics in post-communist Bulgaria and has served as Minister of Defence.
