= Max Leo Keller =

Swiss engineer (1897–1956)

Max Leo Keller (born 22 August 1897 in Zürich, died 13 August 1956 in Birmensdorf, Zürich) was a Swiss engineer and politician of the Fronts Movement.

== Life ==
The son of Franz Alexander Keller and Frieda Keller b. Ripe studied engineering and political sciences in Zürich, Bern and Darmstadt. From 1918 he worked as an electrical engineer in Switzerland and the USA. In 1931 he received his Ph.D. From 1932 to 1939 he was the director of the Bernese Office for the Promotion of New Industries, working as an advisory engineer. From 1933 onwards, he was a political economist for the Fascist National Front and from 1938 to 1939 Chairman of the Board of the newspaper, Neue Basler Zeitung.

In July 1940, after the defeat of France against Germany, Kellermann and his fellow-citizens came to the hope of an upsurge of right-wing forces, the so-called second ‘’Frontenfrühling’’, a term used by Swiss fascists to describe the predicted surge in fascism, referring back to the first Frontenfrühling in 1933. The Swiss President, Marcel Pilet-Golaz, welcomed Keller and the leader of the Eidgenössische Soziale Arbeiterpartei (ESAP), Ernst Hofmann, to an official meeting. On 10 October 1940, under the leadership of Klaus Hügel in Munich, a conference was held with the leaders of the front, Hans Oehler and Benno Schaeppi of the Bund treuer Eidgenossen nationalsozialistischer Weltanschauung (BTE) (Confederation of Loyal Confederates of the Socialist Weltanschauung), Ernst Burri and Arthur Leonhardt of the Schweizerische Gesellschaft der Freunde einer autoritären Demokratie (SGAD) (Swiss Society of Friends of an Authoritarian Democracy). Keller represented the NSB in the conference. Keller was supported by Rudolf Hess, as the new head of the National Movement of Switzerland (NBS). The group demanded closer ties with Nazi Germany, and other radical steps such as calling for the elimination of the bourgeois newspapers of Switzerland and the expulsion of the League of Nations from Switzerland. On 19 November 1940 the Federal Council banned the NBS, citing fear of German annexation.

On 10 June 1941 the Swiss Federal Prosecutor led a blow against the illegal activities of the NBS. Keller was arrested. For lack of evidence, he was released on bail, whereupon he left Switzerland in November 1941 for Germany, where he became director of the Reichswerke Hermann Göring in Berlin and in Weimar. He brought experience from the Swiss electricity industry. In 1944 he tried to unite the opposing national socialist societies abroad as a federation of Swiss national socialists. After the war, Keller returned to Switzerland and was condemned to a total of 14 years for breaching military secrets and attacking the independence of the Swiss Confederation.

Keller was the great-grandson of the politician and co-founder of the Christian Catholic Church of Switzerland, Augustin Keller.
