= National Movement of Switzerland =

Swiss Nazi umbrella group

The National Movement of Switzerland (German: Nationale Bewegung der Schweiz or NBS) was a Nazi umbrella-group formed in Switzerland in 1940.

== Foundation ==
The NBS had its roots in the 1938 foundation of the Bund treuer Eidgenossen nationalsozialistischer Weltanschauung by Rolf Henne after the more moderate Robert Tobler had removed Henne from the leadership of the National Front. In 1940, the Bund absorbed a number of tiny Nazi-supporting organisations to become the NBS under Henne and Dr. Max Leo Keller. Other groups absorbed included the Eidgenössische Soziale Arbeiterpartei and elements of the National Front. The new group also officially bore the French-language name Mouvement Nationale Suisse as an appeal to Francophone Swiss. Keller had worked with Heinrich Himmler and brought with him Andreas von Sprecher, whom the SS had trained, to run the new group's propaganda department.

Keller, Jakob Schaffner and Ernst Hofmann, as representatives of the NBS, received an audience with the Swiss President Marcel Pilet-Golaz (in office throughout 1940) in which they demanded much closer relations with Nazi Germany, leading to eventual incorporation. This was followed by a Munich conference in October 1940 to which the Director of the Reich Security Main Office, Reinhard Heydrich and the Swiss doctor and SS-member Franz Riedweg invited the leaders of the NBS and of other Swiss groups in order to increase cohesion. Ultimately the meeting strengthened the hand of the NBS, as the remnants of the Bund Treuer Eidgenossen Nationalsozialistischer Weltanschauung as well as the Eidgenössische Soziale Arbeiter-Partei and Ernst Leonhardt's Nationalsozialistische Schweizerische Arbeitspartei agreed to be absorbed into the movement.

Despite this strengthening the National Movement did not last long, as the Swiss Federal Council feared that annexation by Germany was just around the corner. In a series of moves against the most extreme groups, the NBS was closed down on 19 November 1940, by which time it had 160 cells and around 4,000 members. The group continued to work underground for a time before a police crackdown which led to most of the leadership fleeing to Germany. Whilst in Germany Keller set up the Bund der Schweizer Nationalsozialisten as an émigré movement, although its influence remained limited; eventually he returned to Switzerland in 1941. Meanwhile, various NBS units continued underground activity secretly, mostly with help from the SS, until World War II ended in 1945.

== See also ==
- Franz Burri
