= Robert Tobler =

Swiss politician (1901–1962)

- Born: Robert Tobler; 23 December 1901; Zürich, Switzerland
- Died: 17 June 1962 (aged 60); Zürich, Switzerland
- Education: University of Zurich
- Occupation: Lawyer
- Known for: Politician
- Political party: National Front

Robert Tobler (23 December 1901 – 17 June 1962) was a Swiss far-right politician.

Born in Zürich, he followed his father by studying law at University of Zurich and working as a lawyer. Initially attracted to liberalism, he came into contact with Hans Oehler and soon helped to found the New Front in 1930. As chairman of the new group he was heavily influenced by Othmar Spann, although fascism quickly became more important for the Front.

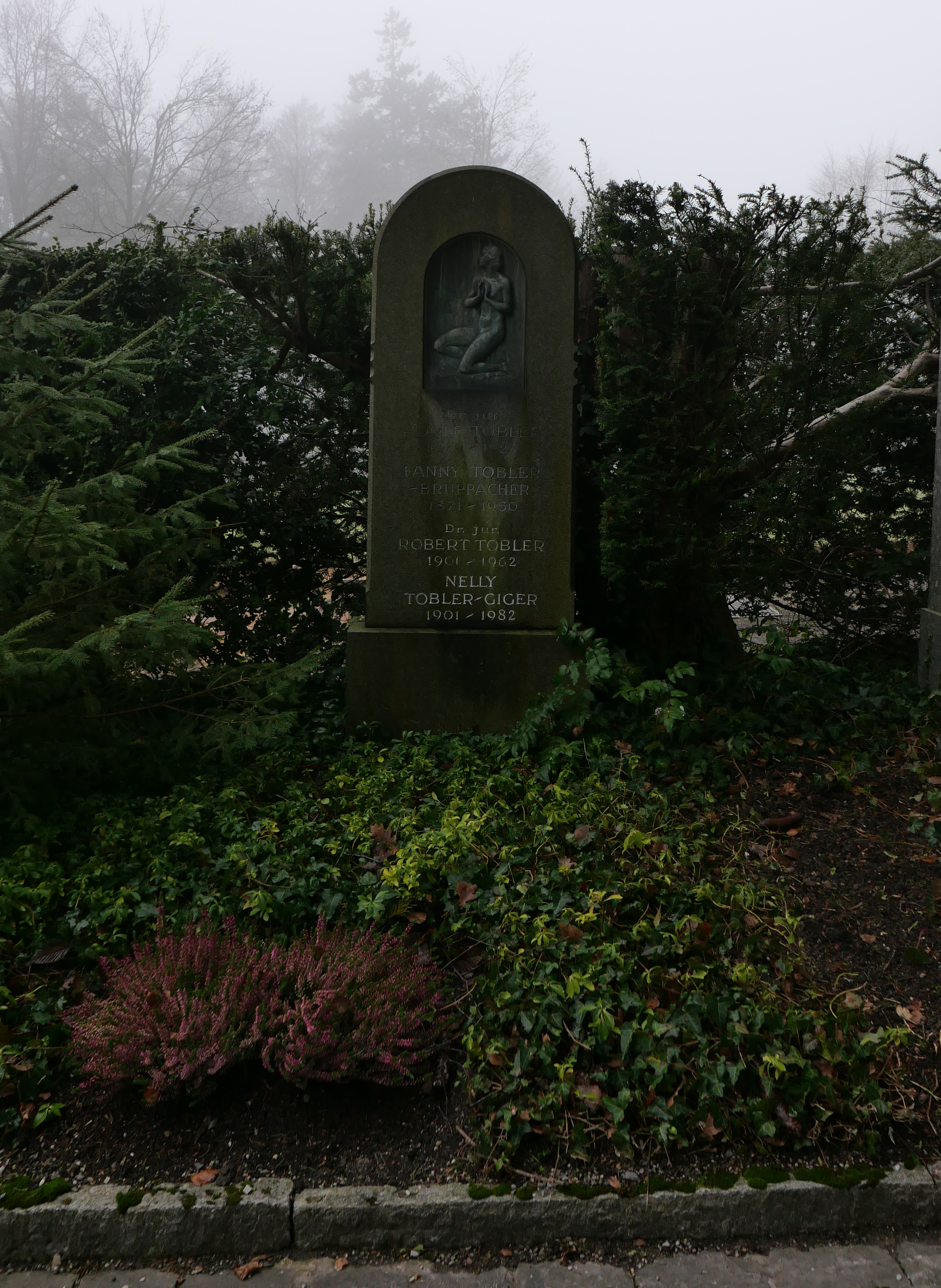
The tomb of Tobler, his wife Nelly, née Giger (1901-1982), and of his parents Adolf (1870-1923) and Fanny Anna, née Bruppacher (1871-1950), at the cemetery of Fluntern in Zurich.

He served as Gaufuehrer for Zürich in the National Front and ran the party paper Die Front, which was funded by Nazi Germany. Tobler was elected to the Swiss parliament in 1935, becoming the only member of the National Front (or indeed any pro-Nazi group) to hold a parliamentary seat in the country. He took over as Front leader in 1938, leading to his predecessor Rolf Henne splitting the movement. Tobler attempted to find a common ground with the government, although by this time it was too late as the movement already had a reputation as firmly pro-Nazi. He was imprisoned in 1940 as a fifth columnist and the Front fell into decay. After his release he led the Eidgenössische Sammlung and Schaffhausen Nationale Gemeinschaft, although both these groups were outlawed in 1943 as part of a wider ban on the National Front and its offshoots. Tobler took no further role in politics and died in his home town.
