= New European Order =

European neo-fascist movement

- Abbreviation: NEO
- Leader: René Binet; Gaston-Armand Amaudruz
- Split from: European Social Movement
- Preceded by: European Liaison Bureau
- Headquarters: Zürich
- Ideology: White supremacism Anti-communism; Neo-fascism; Pan-European nationalism Corporatism; Antisemitism
- Political position: Far-right

The New European Order (NEO) was a neo-fascist, Europe-wide alliance set up in 1951 to promote pan-European nationalism. The NEO, led by René Binet and Gaston-Armand Amaudruz, was a more radical splinter group that broke away from the European Social Movement after denouncing their restrained program.

In the words of scholar Nicolas Lebourg, "the NEO virulently defended the idea of a new world order based on racial hierarchy, in which 'white humanity', by federating its nations, will see the birth of 'the new man within the new race' through a totalitarian party-state."

== History ==
The NEO had its origins in the 1951 Malmö conference, when a group of rebels led by René Binet refused to join the European Social Movement as they felt that it did not go far enough in terms of racialism and anti-communism. As a result Binet joined with Gaston-Armand Amaudruz in a second meeting that same year in Zürich to set up a second group pledged to wage war on communists and non-white people. Initially called the European Liaison Bureau, the group took the name New European Order (NEO) in 1954.

Once established, the NEO worked to set in place more permanent institutions, setting up a European Liaison Centre of the National Forces (Europäische Verbindungsstelle or EVS) in 1953, along with a permanent secretariat in Lausanne led by Amaudruz and his assistant Michael Schenk-Dengg, head of the Deutscher Blok. The EVS became very active in the following years, organising meetings for international representatives, attended by members of the Falange, Italian Social Movement (MSI), Socialist Reich Party and others.

The NEO endured difficulties in 1955 over the issue of South Tyrol, with German speaking delegates attacking the MSI over their support for Italian control of the region. As a result, during the course of the year the Deutscher Block, the Volkspartei der Schweiz, Wiking-Jugend and representatives from Austria all left the NEO.

In October 1960 only four months after the suicide of Francis Parker Yockey, the organisation put out a tribute to him entitled, "Le Suicide d´Ulik Varange".

During a 1997 hearing before the Commission on terrorism headed by senator Giovanni Pellegrino, Stefano Delle Chiaie went on speaking about a "black fascist International" and his hopes of creating the conditions of an "international revolution." In this context he talked about the World Anti-Communist League and admitted having taken part in the New European Order.

The NEO would continue, coming to life from time to time, with Amaudruz continuing as a figurehead of the movement, publishing a monthly magazine Courrier du Continent. Whilst its European dimension became less important it remained as a network for international contacts, becoming influential for a time in the far right of South Africa.

== Ideology ==
The NEO promoted a "European racial policy" to control ethnic inter-marriages and improve the gene pool of white Europeans via medical and scientific intervention. The group also expressed a fervent anti-Semitism and dismissed the Holocaust as "a few thousand Jews and degenerates who died of typhus in the labor camps".

Chilean Nazi esotericist Miguel Serrano had been reportedly connected to the organisation.

== See also ==
- European Social Movement
- French National Committee
- Jeune Europe
- European Liberation Front

== Bibliography ==
- Shields, James G. (2007). The Extreme Right in France: From Pétain to Le Pen. Routledge. ISBN 978-0415372008.
- Tauber, Kurt P. (1959). "German Nationalists and European Union". Political Science Quarterly. 74 (4): 564–589. doi:10.2307/2146424. ISSN 0032-3195. JSTOR 2146424.
