= Rolf Henne =

Swiss politician (1901–1966)

- Born: Rolf Henne; 7 October 1901; Schaffhausen
- Died: 25 July 1966 (aged 64); Küsnacht
- Citizenship: Swiss
- Education: University of Zurich, Ruprecht Karl University of Heidelberg
- Occupation: Lawyer
- Known for: Nazi politician
- Title: Leader of the National Front
- Term: 1934–1938
- Predecessor: Hans Vonwyl
- Successor: Robert Tobler
- Political party: National Front, Bund Treuer Eidgenossen Nationalsozialistischer Weltanschauung, National Movement of Switzerland

Rolf Henne (7 October 1901 – 25 July 1966) was a Swiss politician who supported a form of Nazism.

Born in Schaffhausen, Henne was a distant relative of Carl Jung on his father's side. Henne's own father was himself a prominent physician. Educated at Zurich and Heidelberg, Henne worked as a lawyer. He joined the New Front in 1932, serving as Gaufuehrer for his hometown. On 4 February 1934, he took over as leader of the by then renamed National Front at a time when the movement was in trouble over the extent of its support for the Third Reich. Henne, a strong pro-German, struggled to retain control and in 1938 he was replaced by the more moderate Robert Tobler, his close links to the Nazis and his advocacy of the Protocols of the Elders of Zion making him too extreme for many National Front members. Unable to serve under Tobler, Henne left to form the fiercely pro-Nazi Bund Treuer Eidgenossen Nationalsozialistischer Weltanschauung with Hans Oehler and Jakob Schaffner. Henne was overlooked for leadership of this group, although he was confirmed as Gauführer for Schaffhausen. In 1940 he became a co-founder of the Nationale Bewegung der Schweiz.

He took no further role in politics after the war, instead heading up the Argus der Presse press-cuttings agency (today Argus Data Insights). He died in Küsnacht in 1966.
