= Gaston-Armand Amaudruz =

Swiss neo-fascist political philosopher and Holocaust denier

Guy Amaudruz
- Born: Gaston-Armand Amaudruz; 21 December 1920; Lausanne, Switzerland
- Died: 7 September 2018 (aged 97); Switzerland
- Citizenship: Swiss
- Known for: Neo-fascist activist
- Notable work: Ubu Justicier au Premier Procès de Nuremberg (1949)
- Political party: Swiss Fascist Federation, European Social Movement, New European Order, Volkspartei der Schweiz, Nationale Koordination

Gaston-Armand "Guy" Amaudruz (21 December 1920 – 7 September 2018) was a Swiss neo-fascist political philosopher and Holocaust denier.

== Biography ==
Initially a supporter of the Swiss fascist movement of Arthur Fonjallaz, he came to wider attention in 1949 when he published Ubu Justicier au Premier Procès de Nuremberg, one of the first works to question the veracity of the Holocaust. Increasingly active in neo-fascism, he organized conferences in Malmö in 1951 which led to the formation of a pan-European nationalist group known as the European Social Movement and then led the more radical splinter group known as the New European Order later that year. This group sought the creation of a new Rome–Berlin axis to unite Europe against capitalism and communism and in January 1953 set up a European Liaison Office under Amaudruz in Lausanne to co-ordinate the work of affiliated groups. He also became an early member of the Volkspartei der Schweiz but left the party over the issue of South Tyrol (where he was opposed to irredentism). Of all the groups involved Amaudruz was closest to Ordine Nuovo. Conferences were held irregularly, although membership was fluid and Amaudruz devoted much of his time to writing for journals such as Nation Europa.

In 1983 he set up Nationale Koordination as an umbrella group for figures on the Swiss far right. Bringing together various shades of extremist opinion, the group began to fall out of favour in the mid 1990s as younger activists saw it as an "old men's club".

In 2000 Amaudruz was sentenced to a year in a Swiss jail for Holocaust denial, and returned to prison on similar charges in 2003. However, as of 2005 he was continuing to publish a far right journal, Courrier du continent.

He died on 7 September 2018, at the age of 97.
