= Volkspartei der Schweiz =

Swiss neo-Nazi political party

Volkspartei der Schweiz (VPS, "People's Party of Switzerland") was a Swiss neo-Nazi political party founded in 1951 by Gaston-Armand Amaudruz and Erwin Vollenweider.

The party was one of the driving forces behind the foundation of the New European Order and boasted Hans Oehler amongst its leading members. It published its own paper Courrier du Continent, although this later became the personal journal of Amaudruz. Although an important group on the international neo-Nazi scene VPS did not gain any real influence at home and eventually fizzled out.

The group has no connection to the similarly named Swiss People's Party.
