= Arthur Fonjallaz =

Swiss general, publisher, and fascist (1875–1944)

- Born: Arthur Fonjallaz; 2 January 1875; Prilly, Switzerland
- Died: 24 January 1944 (aged 69); St. Moritz, Switzerland
- Education: Military Academy of Modena
- Occupations: Politician, Army officer
- Employer: Swiss Army
- Notable work: Enérgie et Volonté (1937)
- Title: Brigadier General
- Political party: National Front, Swiss Fascist Federation

Arthur Fonjallaz (2 January 1875 – 24 January 1944) was a Swiss military figure, publisher, and fascist.

The son of a vineyard owner from Lausanne (he was born in nearby Prilly) he attended the Military Academy of Modena and pursued a successful career in the Swiss Army, achieving the highest peacetime rank of brigadier whilst commanding the 4th Infantry Brigade.

Fonjallaz took an early interest in politics, although his ideas were ill-defined as he was both a radical and an admirer of Enrico Corradini, whilst also becoming involved in the Party of Farmers, Traders and Independents. Leaving the party in 1932, he took up a post as principal of military sciences and war history at ETH Zürich. Fonjallaz was relieved of his duties in 1933 after it came to light that he had been a member of the governing board of the fascistic Heimatwehr as well as the National Front, both of which were noted for their virulent anti-Semitism.

The wealthy Fonjallaz then set up Helvetic Action Against Secret Societies, which was particularly geared towards opposing Freemasonry. Taking advantage of the popular initiative process, Fonjallaz attempted to pass an amendment to the Swiss Federal Constitution banning the practice, but this was defeated in 1937.

In 1932, he led a group of his supporters to Italy for a meeting with Benito Mussolini and became a strong supporter of Italian fascism as a result. He soon founded the Swiss Fascist Federation, which received 2 million lira a year from Mussolini. A devoted follower of Mussolini, he spoke of the power of the rhetoric of Il Duce in glowing terms:

As Mussolini began to speak, presenting the goals of fascism, we Swiss understood immediately the significance of this man and responded to the radiant power of his personality. We were all directly convinced that such a leader could do more for world peace than hundreds of politicians.

A supporter of a possible Italian annexation of the country, Fonjallaz was expelled from the Heimatwehr for this position, but continued to be a devotee of Mussolini, publishing a biography of his hero, Enérgie et Volonté (Drive and Will), in 1937. Despite this, Italian funding ended in 1936 and Fonjallaz disappeared from public life.

Fonjallaz returned to the public eye in January 1940, when border guards arrested him in Schaffhausen while he was attempting to enter Nazi Germany. In a subsequent trial, Fonjallaz was found guilty of being a spy for Adolf Hitler, and he spent over two years in prison as a result. He was released in 1943 and died the following year at the age of 69.

== Bibliography ==
- Claude Cantini, Le Colonel Fasciste Suisse: Arthur Fonjallaz, 1973
