= National Front (Switzerland) =

Far-right political party (f. 1930s)

National Front Nationale Front (German) Front National (French) Fronte Nazionale (Italian)
- Leader: Hans Vonwyl and Ernst Biedermann (1933–1934); Rolf Henne (1934–1938); Robert Tobler (1938–1940)
- Founded: 1933
- Dissolved: 1940
- Succeeded by: Eidgenössische Sammlung
- Headquarters: Zürich
- Newspaper: "Der Eiserne Besen"
- Paramilitary wing: Harste
- Membership (1935): 9,000
- Ideology: Fascism
- Political position: Far-right

Party flag

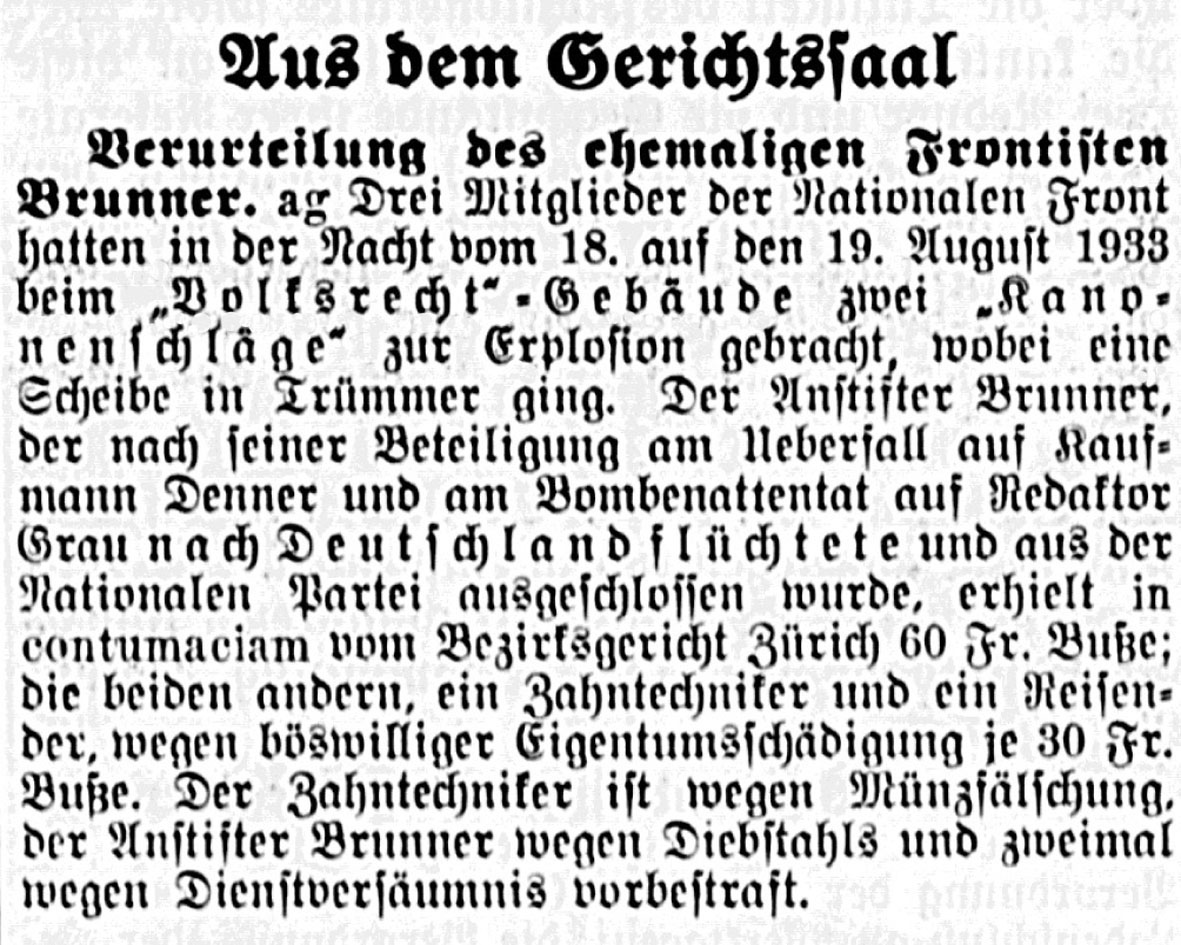
Newspaper article about court proceedings against frontists in Zürich (1934)

The National Front was a far-right party in Switzerland that flourished during the 1930s. At its peak the group had as many as 9,000 members, according to the Historical Dictionary of Switzerland, and "may have had a membership of 25,000 or so", according to the Simon Wiesenthal Center. The party was financed by the Reich Ministry of Propaganda. It became defunct in 1940 and was banned by the Swiss Federal Council in 1943.

== Formation ==
The party began life amongst a number of debating clubs at ETH Zurich, where antisemitism, Swiss nationalism and support for ideas similar to those later adopted in the racial policy of Nazi Germany had become popular among some of the young academics. A number of these groups (all of which co-operated in a loose federation) were formally brought together by Robert Tobler in 1930 to form the Neue Front although this group was not fully committed to fascism. A more radical group, under the leadership of Hans Vonwyl, broke away in the autumn of 1930 to establish the National Front, which aimed to expand its operations outside the university.

== Growth ==
Initially the National Front did not grow far outside the confines of the university but soon the party newspaper, Der Eiserne Besen (The Iron Broom), became widely read and its antisemitic message found an audience. Chaired by Ernst Biedermann, the group experienced growth and in April 1933 formed an alliance with the Neue Front which, under the leadership of Tobler, Paul Lang and Hans Oehler, had itself radicalised and become more open to fascism. The National Front absorbed its counterpart the following month although the Neue Front leadership quickly took charge of the combined movement, with Rolf Henne emerging as chairman. Emil Sonderegger, a former member of the Swiss General Staff, was a prominent speaker and propagandist of the National Front at this time. The party continued to grow and soon won seats on Zürich council, as well as the support of well-known Swiss writers of the time, such as Jakob Schaffner. In all they held 10 seats on Zürich municipal council following the September 1933 election. Ernst Leonhardt, the party's organiser in the North-West, left soon after this after an internal dispute but the move had no impact on the growth of the Front, with a party newspaper, Die Front, established soon afterwards. By 1935, the party claimed 10,000 members.

They did not come out completely in favour of any regime and instead sought to unite German, French and Italian speakers in a common Swiss identity (they maintained links with a minor Romansh far right group, although the National Front did not campaign amongst the Romansh). Nonetheless, their support was more or less wholly confined to German-speakers, with other groups picking up the support of fascist-inclined voters in the other linguistic groups (Union Nationale for the French and Lega Nazionale Ticinese for Italians). Eventually they reached accommodations with the other groups and abandoned campaigning in non-German areas altogether. The party's main support base was in Schaffhausen where it gained seats in the local council, as well as electing a single member of the National Assembly in 1935. The seat was held by Robert Tobler.

The party came under the leadership of Rolf Henne in 1934 and began to pursue a more openly Nazi ideology, in keeping with Henne's personal beliefs. Taking advantage of the direct democracy model used in Swiss politics the National Front forced a referendum on a constitutional amendment in 1935 that sought to redesign the system of government on more nationalist, racial and authoritarian lines. The proposal was heavily defeated.

== Decline ==
The Front experienced decline as fascism came to be characterised in the media as decidedly "un-Swiss" and there was a popular backlash against the movement. In the Berne Trial, the party faced charges that The Protocols of the Elders of Zion violated Swiss law against obscene publications. Despite these setbacks, the National Front reacted by hardening their approach further, establishing a militia group and taking more directly from Nazism as an ideology. Their 26-point programme, published in 1935, underlined the party's fascist credential, calling for the corporate state and containing strong attacks on Bolshevism, socialism, Jewry, Freemasonry and the media. They were able to gain a seat in the National Council for Zürich in the 1935 federal election (Robert Tobler), although results elsewhere were poor.

Internal wrangling followed that led to further decline, with the revelation that the party had received over 10,000 Swiss francs from Nazi Germany's Ministry of Propaganda for its press activity, leading to many members leaving over what they saw as a compromise of Swiss independence. Counter-claims were also made that leaders of the moderate tendency were secretly Freemasons, resulting in further internal strife. Henne was dismissed as leader in 1938 and he, along with Oehler, Schaffner and their supporters, left to form the Bund Treuer Eidgenossen Nationalsozialistischer Weltanschauung, which openly espoused Nazism. This group would ultimately emerge as the National Movement of Switzerland. Meanwhile, those more predisposed towards the Italian model of fascism tended to support the groups of former NF member Colonel Arthur Fonjallaz.

With Henne gone, Tobler assumed leadership duties in 1938, although in that year's local elections and the federal election the following year they lost all of their seats. However, Tobler's moderation did not avert the suspicions of the Swiss government, and police investigations into their activities followed. In 1940, the party was formally dissolved, after Tobler was briefly imprisoned for espionage. Tobler would reform the group as Eidgenössische Sammlung soon afterwards, although this too was gone by 1943, after the Federal Council decided to crack down on groups linked to the Axis powers.

== Federal elections ==
Federal Assembly of Switzerland
Election	# of total votes	% of popular vote	# of seats won
1935	13,740	1.5% ▲	1 ▲
