= Ernst Leonhardt =

Swiss politician

- Born: September 25, 1885; Tracy City, Tennessee, U.S.
- Died: March 26, 1945 (aged 59); Oberndorf am Neckar, Baden-Württemberg, Nazi Germany
- Cause of death: Air raid
- Citizenship: American (by birth), Swiss (until 1943), German
- Occupation: Army officer
- Known for: Nazi politician and propagandist
- Political party: National Front, Volksbund, Schweizerische Gesellschaft der Freunde einer Autoritären Demokratie, Nationalsozialistischer Schweizerbund, Nationalsozialistische Bewegung in der Schweiz

Ernst Leonhardt (September 25, 1885 – March 26, 1945) was an American-born Swiss military figure and pro-Nazi politician.

== Biography ==
Ernst Leonhardt was born to a German-born Swiss father on September 25, 1885, in Tracy City, Grundy County, Tennessee, United States. Leonhardt moved to Switzerland at an early age to attend school at Basel, before joining the Swiss Army, where he rose to the rank of major.

Leonhardt became involved in politics in 1932 when he joined the National Front, and before long he had risen to the rank of Gauführer (equivalent to Gauleiter) in both Basel-City and the Canton of Solothurn. However he clashed with his superiors and in 1933 he left the Front and set up his own Volksbund with fellow dissident Emil Sonderegger. The group was dominated by the forceful personality of Leonhardt, a strong factor in its failure to attract much of a following. He also founded the Schweizerische Gesellschaft der Freunde einer autoritären Demokratie (SGAD) (Swiss Society of Friends of an Authoritarian Democracy) in 1938 (a group officially banned in 1940, although in existence until 1941), whilst he was also a member of Franz Burri's Nationalsozialistischer Schweizerbund and Nationalsozialistische Bewegung in der Schweiz.

Although Leonhardt continued to be involved in Swiss pro-Nazi movements, he had in fact relocated to Germany in 1939 and continued his activism from there. He worked closely with Burri to distribute Nazi propaganda into Switzerland, whilst also recruiting volunteers for the SS and arguing for an Anschluss-style takeover of Switzerland by Hitler. Leonhardt's Swiss citizenship was revoked in 1943 due to this idea. In his absence, the Swiss courts found Leonhardt guilty of attacking the Swiss Confederation's independence and illegally recruiting for a foreign military (i. e. the SS), sentencing him to fifteen and a half years in prison. However, he remained free in Germany for the rest of his life, continuing to produce propaganda. He was killed in an air raid on March 26, 1945, in Oberndorf am Neckar, Rottweil (district), Baden-Württemberg, Germany.

== See also ==
- Berne Trial
