= Frontist movement =

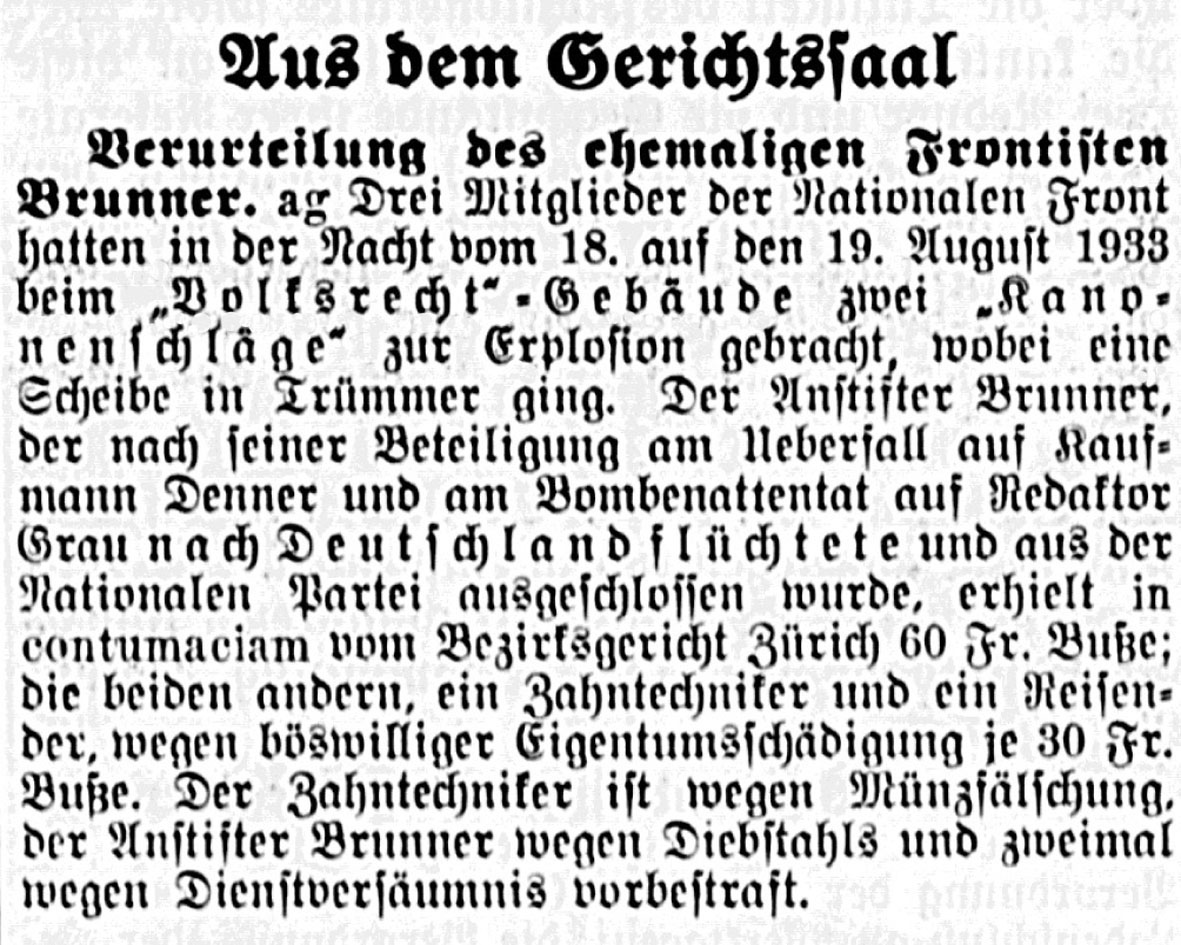
Newspaper article about court proceedings against frontists in Zürich (1934)

The Frontist movement (German: Frontenbewegung), also known as Frontisms, Frontists or Fröntlers, was Switzerland's parallel movement to National Socialism in the German Reich and to fascism in Italy. Since 1930, calls had been growing in the Swiss Confederation for a renewal of the country on a nationalistic basis, under which liberalism and individual rights were to be restricted in favor of a stronger emphasis on the community. However, the Frontenbewegung – in contrast to German National Socialism or Italian fascism – always remained marginal. The most influential group within the fragmented and very diverse Frontenbewegung was the National Front, which was inspired by Italian fascism. The name "Frontenbewegung" comes from the fact that most of these groups had the word front in their name. The Front Movement also had its own leader's salute, called Harus!

== History ==
In May 1935, Walther Bringolf, the mayor of Schaffhausen, was severely disrupted while speaking at an event by a group of Frontists. After the event, there was a mass brawl with socialists. In 1937, the Frontists made a vain attempt to ban the Masonic lodges. In July 1940, after France's defeat, hopes were raised for a second frontist spring, and Federal President Marcel Pilet-Golaz received the frontists Ernst Hofmann and Max Leo Keller for an official talk.

In addition, there were offshoots of German National Socialism in Switzerland; for example, there were 36 local groups of the NSDAP next to a “Hitler Youth Zurich” and the “League of German Girls”. The Zurich local group of the NSDAP was active from 1931, and from 1932 the local groups were grouped into a national group. From 1933 to 1935, the newspaper Der Reichsdeutsche in der Schweiz (Germans in Switzerland) was printed in Horgen, from 1936 to 1938 the Nachrichtenblatt der deutschen Kolonie in der Schweiz (Newsletter of the German Colony in Switzerland) was printed in Bern, and from 1938 to 1945 the Deutsche Zeitung in der Schweiz (The German Newspaper in Switzerland) was printed in Essen. After the Gustloff Affair, the central leadership organs of the NSDAP in Switzerland were dissolved by the Federal Council on February 18, 1936. However, from that point on, Sigismund von Bibra took over the national leadership and acted under the protection of diplomatic immunity.

== Resistance ==
The Swiss Federal Council and the cantonal governments banned some of the organizations (or sections of them). This was made easier by the fact that the bans in Nazi Germany only met with muted disapproval. The reason for this was that the neighbors did not have much time for the extremely fragmented Swiss Fröntler, who were not considered to have much of a chance of seizing power in the long term due to their weakness in party politics.

== See also ==
- Far-right leagues – a similar grouping of far-right parties in France

== Literature ==
- Beat Glaus: Die Nationale Front. Eine Schweizer faschistische Bewegung 1930–1940. Benziger, Zürich/Einsiedeln/Köln 1969 DNB-IDN 456760989 (Dissertation an der Universität Basel).
- Walter Wolf: Faschismus in der Schweiz. Die Geschichte der Frontenbewegungen in der deutschen Schweiz 1930–1945. Flamberg, Zürich 1969, DNB-IDN 458694274 (Dissertation an der Universität Zürich 1969).
- Klaus-Dieter Zöberlein: Die Anfänge des deutschschweizerischen Frontismus : die Entwicklung der politischen Vereinigung «Neue Front» und «Nationale Front» bis zu ihrem Zusammenschluss im Frühjahr 1933. Hain, Meisenheim a. G. 1970.
- Fritz Roth: Die Schweizer Heimatwehr (1925–1937): Ein Beitrag zur Geschichte der schweizerischen Frontenbewegung. 2 Bände. Dissertation. Universität Bern 1973.
- Jürg Fink: Die Schweiz aus der Sicht des Dritten Reiches 1933–1945: Einschätzung und Beurteilung der Schweiz durch die oberste deutsche Führung seit der Machtergreifung Hitlers – Stellenwert der Kleinstaates Schweiz im Kalkül der nationalsozialistischen Exponenten in Staat, Diplomatie, Wehrmacht, SS, Nachrichtendiensten und Presse. Schulthess, Zürich 1985, ISBN 3-7255-2430-0 (Dissertation. Universität Zürich 1985).
- Konrad Zollinger: Frischer Wind oder faschistische Reaktion? Die Haltung der Schweizer Presse zum Frontismus 1933. Chronos, Zürich 1991, ISBN 3-905278-75-8 (Dissertation. Universität Zürich 1990).
- Hans Stutz: Frontisten und Nationalsozialisten in Luzern 1933–1945 (= Luzern im Wandel der Zeit. Heft 9). Luzern 1997, ISBN 3-7239-0094-1.
- Matthias Wipf: Frontismus in einer Grenzstadt – Schaffhausen im Zweiten Weltkrieg 1933–1945. Bern 1998, OCLC 612144305 (Seminararbeit an der Universität Bern, Historisches Institut, 1998, Standort: Stadtarchiv Schaffhausen).
- Daniel Gut: Neidkopf: zur Naturgeschichte des Schweizer Frontisten Hans Kläui – eine literarische Recherche. Elfundzehn, Eglisau 2015, ISBN 978-3-905769-38-8.
- Christian Koller: Weder Zensur noch Propaganda: Der Umgang des Schweizerischen Sozialarchivs mit rechtsextremem Material. In: LIBREAS. Library Ideas, 35, 2019.
- Yves Schumacher: Nazis! Fascistes! Fascisti!: Faschismus in der Schweiz 1918–1945. Orell Füssli, Zürich 2019, ISBN 978-3-280-05689-9.
