= Hans Oehler =

Swiss journalist (1888–1967)

- Born: Hans Oehler; 18 December 1888; Aargau, Switzerland
- Died: 7 January 1967 (aged 78); Dielsdorf, Switzerland
- Occupation: Journalist
- Known for: Political activist
- Political party: Popular League for the Independence of Switzerland, National Front, Bund Treuer Eidgenossen Nationalsozialistischer Weltanschauung, National Movement of Switzerland, Volkspartei der Schweiz

Hans Oehler (18 December 1888 – 7 January 1967) was a Swiss journalist and a sympathizer of Nazism.

Initially a journalist, Oehler turned his attention towards producing pro-German material. Later, he was one of the founders of the Schweizerische Monatshefte für Politik und Kultur (SM) in 1921. This very quickly became the mouthpiece for the Volksbund für die Unabhängigkeit der Schweiz (Popular League for the Independence of Switzerland), a group he had participated around the same time which opposed the League of Nations. He briefly met Adolf Hitler when Hitler visited Switzerland in 1923 and became a sympathizer of both Fascist Italy and Othmar Spann.

Although the Popular League proved to be short-lived, Oehler continued to publish SM as an outlet for his political ideas until, in 1932, he joined the New Front. 1934 he had to resign as an editor of SM because of his pro-nazism mindset. With the launch of the National Front in 1934 Oehler took charge of editing the new party's paper Nationale Front, as well as being appointed foreign affairs spokesman. Ousted from SM by the Front he founded a new paper, Nationale Hefte and by 1938 had split from the Front altogether. After the split he joined with Rolf Henne in forming the hardline Nazi Bund Treuer Eidgenossen Nationalsozialistischer Weltanschauung, another minor group which was absorbed by the National Movement of Switzerland in 1940.

Oehler's profile fell as World War II neared its conclusion and he became very much a marginal figure in post-war Switzerland. Having attended a meeting in Munich in 1940 organised to bring together pro-Nazi Swiss leaders, Oehler was tried for treason by a federal court in 1947 and sentenced to two years in prison. Upon his release Oehler became a leading member of the Volkspartei der Schweiz and headed up the Swiss branch of Nation Europa, an international neo-Nazi journal. He also adopted the pseudonym Hans Rudolf to translate works into German, notably Nuremberg ou la Terre Promise of Maurice Bardèche, as well as writing for the far right journal Turmwart. Oehler continued his political activity until his death at Dielsdorf.
