= Nazism in Sweden =

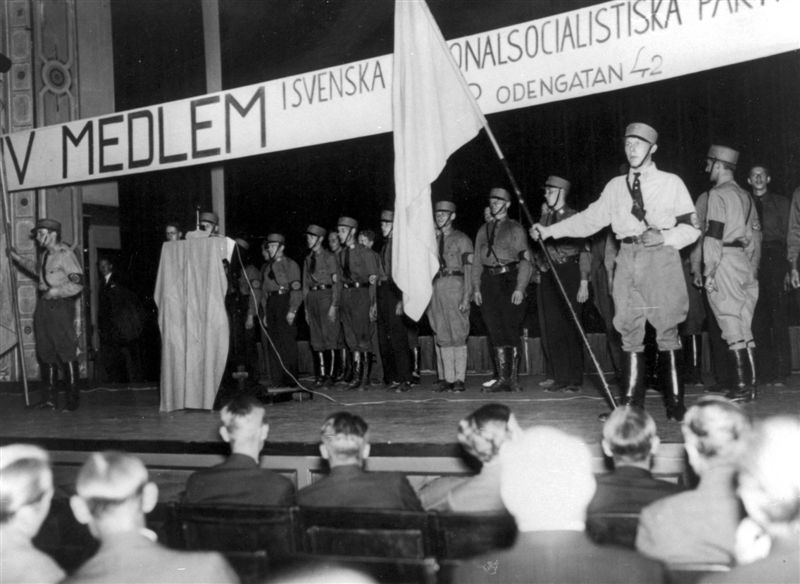
A Swedish National Socialist Party meeting being held in 1933

Nazism in Sweden has been more or less fragmented and unable to form a mass movement since its beginning in the early 1920s. Several hundred parties, groups, and associations existed from the movement's founding through the present. At most, purely Nazi parties in Sweden have collected around 27,000 votes in democratic parliamentary elections. The high point came in the municipal elections of 1934 when the Nazi parties were victorious in over one hundred electoral contests. As early as January 22, 1932, the Swedish Nazis had their first public meeting with Birger Furugård addressing an audience of 6000 at the Haymarket in Stockholm.

Like their German counterparts, the Swedish Nazis were strongly antisemitic and as early as May, 1945 became early adopters of Holocaust denial. The Swedish Nazi groups persisted after the war until they were officially dissolved in 1950. During this post-war period, they were more or less completely inactive politically. In 1956, a new Swedish Nazi party, the Nordic Reich Party (NRP), was formed by Göran Assar Oredsson and Vera Oredsson (previously married to Nazi leader Sven-Olov Lindholm). This party brought together the heritage of the older Nazi generations in the 1980s when Swedish neo-Nazism began growing stronger, and they managed to gather some small groups of the new generation of Nazi skinheads. A Swedish white supremacist movement arose during this period, especially among some former criminal motorcycle gang members and younger white power skinhead youths.

Particularly in the 1990s, there was a plethora of neo-Nazi organizations, most infamous being the militant network Vitt Ariskt Motstånd ("VAM") which translates to White Aryan Resistance but was not associated with the US organization bearing the same name. VAM promoted the idea about a race war and gathered young skinheads and neo-Nazi activists in several cities, and their members committed several serious crimes, including arsons, armed bank robberies, weapons and arms thefts against desolate Swedish army and police headquarters, and series of brutal assaults and beatings. Other groups such as the Riksfronten and the party National Socialist Front (NSF) was also founded.

Similar to the movement during WWII, there was tendencies toward fragmentation, disagreements and infighting, which accelerated after the Malexander murders, a 1999 bank robbery and murder of two policemen by a group of militant neo-nazi criminals whose aim was to form a revolutionary underground Nazi organization. It also evolved as a variety of explicitly racist organizations which drew from other sources. The Swedish Resistance Movement was also formed by former VAM leaders. Short-term attempts to create an umbrella organization were discontinued after some time. In the 2000s, the National Socialist Front remained the largest Swedish Nazi organization, gaining around 1400 votes in the parliamentary elections of 2006. It was officially shut down in November 2008, and replaced by (or renamed to) the Party of the Swedes. The largest demonstrations was the annual "Salem march" (Salemmarschen) every December from 2001 to 2011. The first demonstrations attracted 2000 participants, but this number dwindled for each year. The magazine Expo, co-founded by Stieg Larsson, campaigns against "modern" Swedish Nazism and right-wing extremism.

== Forerunners ==
The early Nazi movement in Sweden had its roots in various antisemitic organizations formed in the late 1800s.

In the 1920s, Barthold Lundén published the antisemitic populist newspaper Vidi, which was inspired by Mauritz Rydgren's earlier attempts to establish an antisemitic broadsheet in the early 1900s. Vidi ran several campaigns against both Jews and homosexuals. In 1923 Lundén also founded the Swedish Antisemitic Union (Svenska Antisemitiska Föreningen) which remained active until 1931. Many of the drivers of Swedish Nazism emerged from this environment.

== First period ==
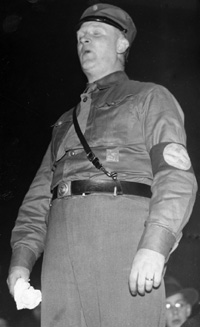
Furugård in 1932. The swastika is in the Swedish national colors of blue and gold.

The earliest Nazi associations include the National Socialist Freedom League (SNFf) from 1924 to 1926, which preceded the Swedish National Socialist Farmers' and Workers' Party (SNBA). Leaders included the brothers Sigurd, Gunnar, and Birger Furugård.

In 1926, Konrad Hallgren founded the Swedish Fascist People's Party (SFFP) and its paramilitary wing the Sveriges Fascistiska Kamporganisation (SKFO), or the Swedish Fascist Combat Organization. In 1930, Stig Bille lead a splinter group called the New Swedish People's League (NSFF) to split from the primary nazi organizations. On April 1, 1930, the SNBA and SNFP merged as the New Swedish National Socialist League (NNF, later NSFF). The NNF adopted the new name Swedish National Socialist Party (SNSP) one year later led by Sigurd Furugård. This political organization first participated in a general election in 1931, when it garnered 279 votes in the Stockholm City Council Elections.

Furugård's disputes with Sven Olov Lindholm, editor of the party's newspaper, led to the expulsion of Lindholm and his followers on January 13, 1933. These individuals formed the National Socialist Workers' Party (SNAP, later NSAP). The two parties were commonly referred to by their leaders as "Furugårdists" or "Lindholmists". On October 5, 1933, ten followers of Furugård stormed Lindholm's headquarters and stole cash and membership lists and were only stopped by police intervention. The fight between the two parties continued with periodic violence through the parliamentary elections of 1936 where the split caused the parties to fail miserably. Furugård was so discouraged he closed down operations of his SNSP. The NSAP saw further disappointments and a split of the left wing of the party.

As time went on, Per Engdahl (1909–1994) became a prominent figure in the Swedish Nazi movement. After his studies at Uppsala University, Engdahl joined the SKFO in 1928 but left for Bille's new NSFF. In 1930 he founded his own group, the National Association for the New Sweden (RDNS), which merged with Elmo Lindholm's National League of Sweden (SNF) in 1937.

The many divisions in the Nazi movement caused a power struggle. One attempt to bring unity was the National Socialist Bloc (NSB) formed in 1933 under the leadership of colonel Martin Ekström, but that short-lived effort brought little success. The NSB did, however, manage to unify a number of small cult-like groups such as the Swedish National Socialist Coalition and the National Socialist League, but it failed when it was unable to attract the SNSP or NSAP. The members were mostly from the upper class, and many were officers in the military. Two founders included Colonel Archibald Douglas and general major Rickman von der Lancken.

The Rightist Party's (now the Moderate Party) youth league had been impressed by Hitler's successes in Germany, and it decided to adopt paramilitary practices on Hitler's model. The youth league broke with the Rightist Party and formed the SNU (Swedish national youth league), later renamed the National League of Sweden (SNF). Three right-wing politicians who joined the SNF were elected to parliament in 1932. One of these was major Alf Meyerhöffer. All the seats were lost in the 1936 election.

Vasakärven

In 1938, parts of the Swedish Nazi movement broke with Hitler. Lindholm's NSAP changed its name to the Swedish Socialist Coalition (SSS) and replaced its swastika with a bundle of wheat (Vasakärven). Other Swedish Nazis, however, maintained their loyalty to Hitler and the Germans and viewed Lindholm as a traitor.

== Wartime ==
Sweden maintained a position of ostensible neutrality during the Second World War; in spite of that, however, it acted as a major supplier of raw materials for Hitler's military, provided routes for the transportation of soldiers and materials including through Luleå, Gävle, Sundsvall and Härnösand, laundered the gold confiscated from Holocaust victims, and often failed to provide adequate asylum for refugees including the near-completely exterminated Norwegian Jews. Some Swedes even volunteered with the Waffen SS. As in other wartime neutral European countries such as Ireland and Switzerland, the neutrality policy draws continued debate.

In 1941, Engdahl once again broke with his organization to find his own party, the Swedish Opposition (SO). Its main concern was anti-communism. Engdahl opposed all communism in the building of Swedish society, and printed 60,000 copies of an anti-communist brochure. Although Engdahl's new party expressed its admiration for Hitler and Nazi Germany on many occasions, the SO was not a Nazi or fascist party in a formal sense. Engdahl highlighted the differences between his party and National Socialism, particularly on Swedes united as a blood group rather than led by a dictatorship. As the war continued, the SO's sympathy with Hitler continued. On April 20, 1944, Engdahl wrote on the occasion of Hitler's 55th birthday, "words are too poor to express what we owe this man, who is a symbol of the best of what the world has produced. We can only celebrate him as the god-sent rescuer of Europe."

When the war broke out, the former Youth League received a boost. The SNF's activities increased and membership soared. Its vogue proved short-lived, and opposition increased. Demonstrators showed up to its meetings and fighting was common. After a meeting in Uppsala on May 4, 1945, the police were unable to hold the crowds apart and rioting broke out.

Lindholm's SSS had already distanced itself from Nazi Germany when the war broke out. Lindholm visited Germany during his honeymoon in July/August 1939 meeting Heinrich Himmler among others. He maintained some contact with Himmler throughout the war. From the German perspective, the SSS was the most organized National Socialist party in Sweden, even though there were those in the party who disapproved of Lindholm's personal attitude toward Germany. After the German occupation of Norway and Denmark as "Jew depending western powers" Germany fell in the party's esteem.

The SO and public sympathy influenced Sweden's response to the refugee crisis. Between 1933 and 1939, Sweden accepted only 3000 Jewish refugees and permitted 1000 more to use Sweden as a transit stop. As the war broke out, Sweden only absorbed political refugees and turned away Jews from occupied Norway at the border. Sweden eventually accepted 900 Jews from Norway, but border controls and immigration contributed to the murder of over 700 Norwegian Jews at Auschwitz. In 1943, the policy changed, and Sweden provided asylum to 8000 Danish Jews.

== Postwar ==
In January 1946, under pressure by the Soviet Union, Sweden forcibly transferred to the Soviet Union over 146 Baltic Waffen-SS and 2,364 German soldiers who had been interned in Swedish prison camps. At least seven of the internees committed suicide at their camp in the village of Rinkaby, rather than allow themselves to be handed over to the Soviet Union.

After the war, the SO renamed itself the New Swedish Movement (NSR, Nysvenska Rörelsen) and in public attempted to distance itself from Nazi Germany and its own history. In private, it helped smuggle and conceal Nazi collaborators, soldiers, and Waffen-SS volunteers from the refugee camps and allied powers. The regular party activities continued unabated after the war, but the conditions deteriorated. The NSR was refused permission to rent premises in Göteborg including the Hvitfeldtska gymnasiet and the Folkets Hus. Per Engdahl remained a central figure in European National Socialist and fascist circles. The NSR cultivated ties to similar organizations, primarily in Denmark and Norway, and it established an employment office in Malmö for the Danes and Norwegians who collaborated with the wartime occupation forces and fled to Sweden. On May 21, 1951, it hosted 60 delegates for the first "pan-European congress" of Nazis.

The NSR experienced a resurgence during the 1950s. Endahl lectured throughout Europe and made ties with fascists in other countries. The national membership of the party rose successfully. In 1950 a member of the Riksdag, James Dickson of the Rightist Party (now the Moderate Party), took part in a NSR meeting. This success came to a halt in 1960 with the so-called "Swastika epidemic," where the painting of swastikas spread in many countries. Rabbi Nussbaum in America argued that the painting of swastikas was led by Per Engdahl from Malmö. Engdahl denied this and claimed the NSR was the victim of a conspiracy by the World Jewish Congress and that it was Jews themselves who were behind the swastikas. From the middle of the 1960s, the NSR membership and contributions dropped, and the party languished (with the exception of a few high-profile events) until the end of the 1980s when it managed to recruit new members. As early as 1991/92 it ceased operation, and the last issue of its magazine Vägen Framåt (The Way Forward) was published in 1992.

In addition to the NSR, the Nordic Reich Party (NRP, Nordiska Rikspartiet) was formed in 1956 and became particularly active in the postwar years. It had a paramilitary faction called the National Action Group (RAG, Riksaktiongruppen), and several of its members were convicted of assaults and threats. In the late 1980s one of the RAG activists was selected as chair of the newly formed Sweden Democrats.

Because of Sweden's wartime neutrality, the nation never experienced the outright bans on Nazism and propaganda of the former Axis powers. National Socialist parties are still allowed to campaign for office. A law in 1950 prohibiting incitement against ethnic groups was passed in response to the antisemitic activities of Einar Åberg (the Lagen om hets mot folkgrupp). The next major legislation did not occur until 1994 when an amendment was passed making racist motivations for crimes aggravating circumstances. In 1996 the Swedish supreme court ruled the display of a swastika could be considered incitement. Also, the government won a case against Tomas Lindvist, a major producer of neo-Nazi music. The government set up a commission in 1997 to investigate the transfer of Nazi gold and diamonds to Sweden and the involvement of Swedish companies in the Holocaust.

== Neo-Nazism ==
At the end of the 1980s a new National Socialist movement developed in Sweden. This cannot be classified as classical Nazi, but it has its roots in the interwar National Socialist Parties. The link between these parties and the new Nazism is mediated largely by the Nordic National Party (NRP). In its outlet, Storm magazine, which began publication in 1990, the party hoped to collect all the "race-conscious whites" in Sweden and collect the scattered movement:

We are the network we need to create for our freedom struggle. We do not care a damn if you want to describe yourself as a patriot, revisionist, nationalist, fascist, corporate elite, creator, or, of course, National Socialist ... as long as you are racially conscious. We urge not to avoid infighting with our brother organizations.

In line with its effort to unify the movement, Storm sought to collaborate with the National League of Sweden (SNF), the Creative Church, the Nordic Reich Party, and the Norwegian group, Zorn 88. At a meeting in Stockholm on April 20, 1998, it formed a new network named VAM (The White Aryan Resistance). It became well known for a series of spectacular burglaries and robberies including one where they broke into a Lidingö police station and stole 36 guns. At the same time John Ausonius, the "Laser Man" engaged in a shooting spree targeting immigrants. He was not involved in the neo-Nazi movement, but the concurrence of the events garnered press exposure. In late 1992 the movement expanded considerably, with Storm offering mail order merchandise and promoting a white-supremacist rock band. In 1993 the penultimate issue of Storm claimed the movement was divided into two camps: the parliamentary and the revolutionary. VAM no longer exists as a movement, but there are numerous organizations rooted in it, including the Swedish Resistance Movement (SMR) led by Klas Lund and the Party of the Swedes (SVP). In 2010, the SVP party won one seat in the council of Grästorp Municipality, the first overtly Nazi party to gain public office since the second world war.

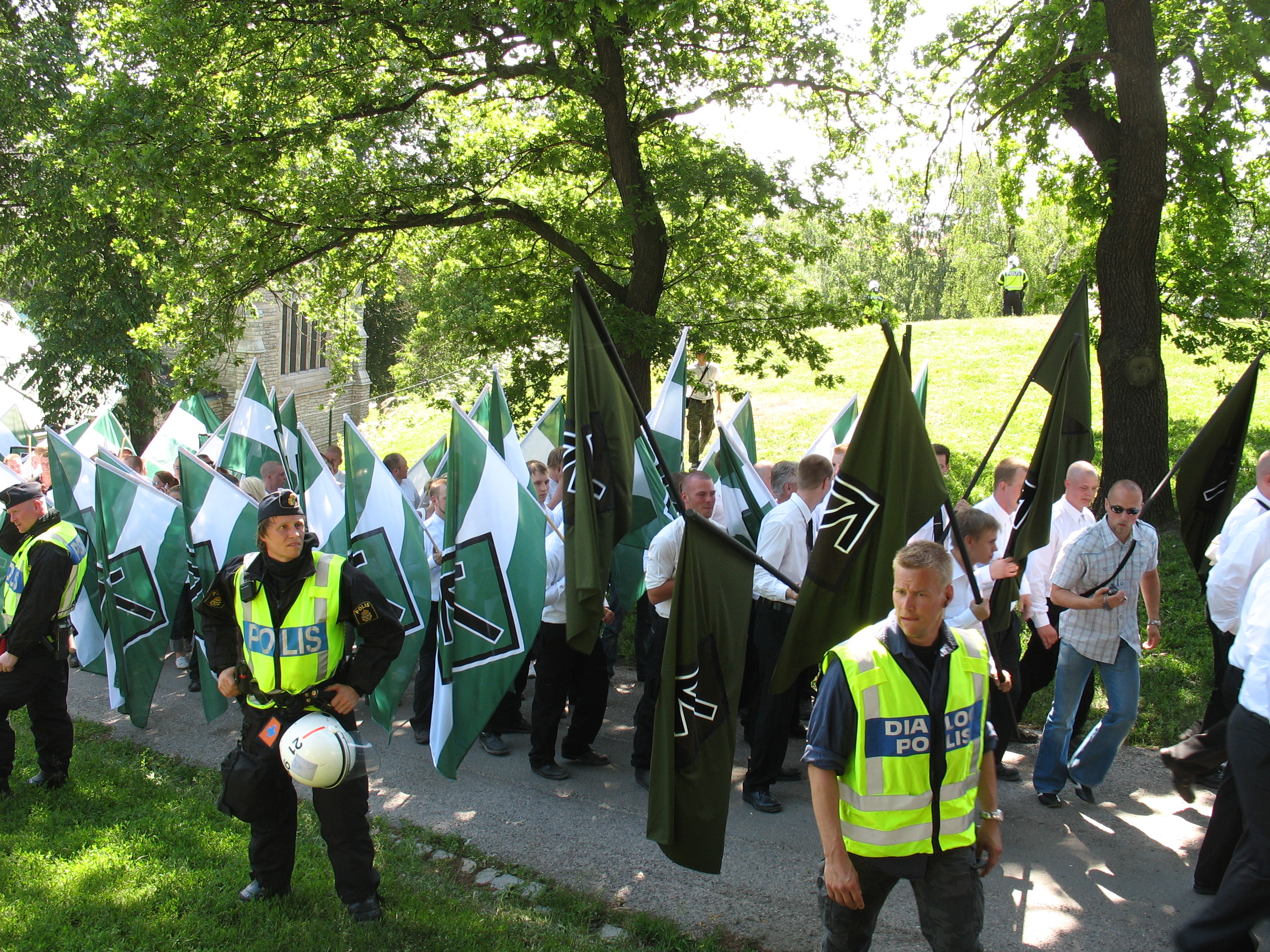
A Salem March, 2007

Currently, the website Info-14 (published as a paper from 1995 to 2000) serves as a prominent hub of the neo-Nazi movement. The title comes from David Lane's Fourteen Words, "We must secure the existence of our people and a future for white children." The paper claimed one police killing in Malexander and a car bomb in Nacka in 1999, leading the paper's editor, Robert Vesterlund to be sentenced to eighteen months in prison for incitement to racial hatred, threats against an officer, and aggravated incitement. The paper is synonymous with the Salem Foundation which organizes "Salem Marches" (salemmarschen or folkets marchen). A number of "independent nationalists" are gathered around Info-14.

Neo-Nazi organizations and sympathizers have committed other violent crimes in recent decades. In 1998, Hampus Hellekant murdered syndicalist union member Björn Söderberg after Söderberg exposed the ideology of Vesterlund in the workplace. The case also became the focus of an important debate over privacy and medical ethics.

== Ideology ==
Between the hundreds of Nazi organizations that have existed in Sweden there have been many ideological contradictions. Of the period between 1924 and 1945, Stellan Bojerud suggests distinguishing between three categories: National Socialism, Nazism, and right-wing extremism. He argues that Nazism differs from National Socialism in its leadership cult and in an absence of anti-capitalism and of anti-clericalism—features which are more pronounced in National Socialism, which lies more to the left of Nazism. In Germany, National Socialism evolved into Nazism. Right-wing extremism has an equally strong explicit racism as the actual principal enemy. Bojerud's terminology is not established in academic circles.

Karl Alvar Nilsson draws no distinction between National Socialism and Nazism, but sees an anti-capitalist development in German Nazism's appeasing big industrialists. He stresses that Nazism cannot be defined in the same manner as liberalism or socialism; instead he emphasizes several characteristics:

- racism linked to social darwinism
- an organic approach to the nation
- resistance against Marxism and against big-business capitalism, both of which are regarded as Jewish-inspired and the enemies of an Aryan race
- a willingness to transform class society into a "capable community"
- rejection of parliamentarianism

Nilsson believes these criteria are also less useful in defining postwar nazism. Some organizations are close to classic nazism, while others tone down antisemitism and focus on other ethnic groups, develop a neo-liberal direction, draw from sociobiology, developed a democracy-friendly rhetoric, and turned against Nazi Germany. Common throughout is racism, elitism, and contempt for the weak. Right-wing extremism is a broader term including non-democratic ideas from the right.

Common throughout is racism, elitism, and contempt for the weak.

Of neo-Nazi movements, the Swedish Resistance Movement (SMR) most resembles classical Nazism. It openly professes National Socialism and believes that people can be divided into races with characteristic properties. It calls for a government with a strong leader but does not necessarily desire a dictatorship nor a liberal democracy. It also criticizes the materialism which it finds present in contemporary society–luxury consumption and environmental degradation. Although it embraces racial teaching and advocates that only people of "Western genetic material" be considered citizens, it opposes supernational institutions and upholds Sweden's independence. The SMR believes that considerable natural resources and public utilities should be publicly owned and that "class division" should be replaced by "class community"—in other words, classes should remain but maintain a harmonious coexistence.

Further ideologies emerged when groups of "independent nationalists" started demonstrating in several cities in the 2000s. The network was centered on info-14, but the leaders prefer to call themselves "Autonomous nationalists". In many ways they embraced the features of the "autonomous left", opposing all racism. Some demonstrators appeared in Palestinian scarves, likening the Middle Eastern plight to racism against ethnic Swedes.

== Mapping of opponents ==
Key to the Swedish Nazi strategy has been the identification and mapping of their opponents. Both before and during the second world war the Swedish Nazis tracked the Jews in Sweden and the Nordic Reich Party later maintained a "secret" UTJ-STJ register of persons regarded as enemies. the lists included, inter alia, journalists and public figures. Party mapping activities continued through the 1970s. In the early 1990s they resumed, inspired by the Norwegian Arne Myrdal, who founded Norway Against Immigration (NMI). This group had conducted an extensive survey of real and imagined enemies. The journal Werwolf published a "death list" in 1995 naming over 300 people to be executed. This journal was published by the National Socialists in Göteborg (NS-Göteborg) and the British organization Combat 18.

In 1991/92 the Anti-AFA formed against an organized anti-Fascist group, the AFA, or Antifa. The Anti-AFA's activities cover England, Germany, Denmark, and Norway. In Sweden, it was initially directed by those following the magazine Storm. The editor was eventually convicted of incitement for the publication of a list of journalists, police, and anti-racists in 1993. By 1996, the National Alliance (NA) mainly ran the Anti-AFA, which maintained close links to info-14. Anti-AFA is probably not an organization but rather a network of people who share their work anonymously. Its effectiveness was seen in provoking the 1999 Nacka carbombing against journalists "Peter Karlsson" and "Katerina Larsson" (both pseudonyms) as well as the famous 1999 murder of Björn Söderberg.

== Swedish Nazis and sympathizers ==
Many individuals who had been active in the Nazi movement have connections in established Swedish society. These include eminent individuals and professionals such as police officers. One of the most famous Swedes with links to nazism is the founder of IKEA, Ingvar Kamprad. He joined the New Swedish Movement (NSR) in 1942 and was actively involved in recruitment and sales of nationalist merchandise. He also made donations. The NSR's organ "The Way Forward" (Vägen Framåt) described IKEA in 1991 as a corporate project in line with National Socialist ideology and praised Kamprad's loyalty to the ideals of his youth.

Only in recent years has the Swedish press acknowledged Queen Silvia's father, Walter Sommerlath, was a member of the German NSDAP, and never left it. Another well-known Swede who sympathized with Hitler was the writer and explorer Sven Hedin who was a member of the National Society of Sweden-Germany (riksföreningen Sverige-Tyskland).

A number of Swedish Nazis and sympathizers were active members of the military, most notably was the future Colonel Alf Meyerhöffer, one of the three MPs who left the Rightist party to join the SNF. After the war, it was revealed a number of senior military personnel made financial contributions to the SNF's journal the Dagsposten. These included the Commanding General of the VI Military District, Major General Nils Rosenblad. During the war, the security service identified Nazis in Sweden, finding in August 1942 101 policemen were affiliated with the movement. Among them were twenty-one members of the SO and a number of sympathizing former members.

== Selected list of Swedish Nazi groups ==
| Name | Founded | Dissolved | Notes |
|---|---|---|---|
| Ariska brödraskapet | 1996 | Exists | Prison Gang |
| Folkfronten | 2008 | 2009 | renamed Party of the Swedes |
| Fria nationalister | 2008 | Exists | Network of local organizations |
| Föreningen Det Nya Sverige (FDNS) | 1931 | 1932 | Renamed Riksförbundet Det nya Sverige |
| National Socialist Bloc (NSB) | 1933 | 1938 | Umbrella organization |
| National Socialist Front (NSF) | 1994 | 2008 | Succeeded by the Party of the Swedes |
| Nationella Alliansen (na) | 1995 | 1997 | Umbrella Organization |
| The Nordic Reich Party (NRP) | 1956 | 2009 | Succeeded by Nordiska Rikspartiet Traditionsförening |
| Nysvenska Folkförbundet (NSFF) | 1930 | 1930 | Splinter group of the SNFP, merged with the NNF |
| Nysvenska Nationalsocialistiska Förbundet (NNF) | 1930 | 1931 | Renamed the Svenska Nationalsocialistiska Partiet |
| New Swedish Movement (NSR) | 1930 | 1980 | Founded by Per Engdahl |
| Riksförbundet Det nya Sverige (FDNS) | 1932 | 1937 | Merged with SNF |
| Swedish Resistance Movement (SMR) | 1997 | Exists | Considered largest current nazi organization |
| Svenska Nationalsocialistiska Bonde- och Arbetarföreningen (SNBA) | 1929 | 1930 | Absorbed into Nysvenska Nationalsocialistiska Förbundet (NNF) |
| Svenska Nationalsocialistiska Frihetsförbundet (SNF) | 1924 | 1929 | Changed to Svenska Nationalsocialistiska Bonde- och Arbetarföreningen |
| Svenska Nationalsocialistiska Partiet (SNSP) | 1931 | 1936 | Dissolved after the 1936 Parliamentary Elections |
| Party of the Swedes (SVP) | 2008 | 2015 | Emerged from the Nationalsocialistisk front, temporarily named the Folkfronten |
| Swedish Opposition (SO) | 1941 | 1945 | Renamed New Swedish Movement |
| Svensksocialistisk samling (SSS) | 1938 | 1950 | Lindholm's party |
| National Socialist People's Party of Sweden (SFFP) | 1926 | 1929 | Renamed Sveriges Nationalsocialistiska Folkparti |
| Sveriges Fascistiska Kamporganisation (SFKO) | 1926 | 1929 | Sister organization of the SFFP |
| Sveriges Nationalsocialistiska Arbetarparti (SNAP or NSAP) | 1933 | 1938 | Renamed Svensksocialistisk samling |
| Sveriges Nationalsocialistiska Folkparti (SNFP) | 1929 | 1930 | Merged with Nysvenska Nationalsocialistiska Förbundet |
| National League of Sweden (SNF) | 1915/1934 | Exists | Formed by the Swedish National Youth Council, name change in 1934 |
| White Aryan Resistance (VAM) | 1990 | 1993 | Network of neo-nazis |
| Nordic Resistance Movement (NRM) | 1997 | Exists | Largest national socialist movement in Nordic countries |

== See also ==
- Anti-Jewish Action League of Sweden
- Sweden during World War II
- Sweden and the Winter War
- Swedish iron mining during World War II
- Swedish neutrality
