= List of fascist movements =

This page lists political regimes and movements that have been described as fascist during the middle of the 20th century. For movements in more recent periods, see neo-fascism.

Whether a certain government is to be characterized as a fascist government, an authoritarian government, a totalitarian government, a police state or some other type of government is often a matter of dispute. The term "fascism" has been defined in various ways by different authors. Many of the regimes and movements which are described in this article can be considered fascist according to some definitions but they cannot be considered fascist according to other definitions. See definitions of fascism for more information about that subject.

== Axis powers (1922–1945) ==
=== Italy (1922–1943) ===
The first fascist country was Italy, ruled by Benito Mussolini (Il Duce). The Italian Fascists imposed totalitarian rule and crushed political and intellectual opposition, while promoting economic modernization, traditional social values and a rapprochement with the Roman Catholic Church.

Italy was a leading member of the Axis powers in World War II, battling with initial success on several fronts. However, after the German-Italian defeats in Africa and the Soviet Union and the subsequent Allied landings in Sicily, King Victor Emmanuel III overthrew and arrested Mussolini, and the Fascist Party in areas (south of Rome) controlled by the Allied invaders was shut down. The new government signed an armistice with the Allies in September 1943. Mussolini was then rescued from prison by German paratroopers, and after his rescue, he was installed as the head of the "Italian Social Republic" in northern Italy, a state which continued to fight against the Allies alongside Germany.

=== Germany (1933–1945) ===
The Nazi Party, led by Adolf Hitler, espoused a form of fascism that incorporated fervent antisemitism, anti-communism, scientific racism, and the use of eugenics. Its extreme nationalism originated in pan-Germanism and the ethno-nationalist Völkisch movement which had been a prominent aspect of German nationalism since the late 19th century, and it was strongly influenced by the Freikorps paramilitary groups that emerged after Germany's defeat in World War I, from which came the party's underlying "cult of violence". Nazism subscribed to pseudo-scientific theories of a racial hierarchy and social Darwinism, identifying the Germans as a part of what the Nazis regarded as an Aryan or Nordic master race.

On 30 January 1933, Hitler was appointed Chancellor of Germany, the head of government, by the President of the Weimar Republic, Paul von Hindenburg, the head of State. The Nazi Party then began to eliminate all sources of political opposition and it also began to consolidate its power. Hindenburg died on 2 August 1934 and Hitler became dictator of Germany by merging the offices and powers of the Chancellery and the Presidency. Genocide and mass murder became hallmarks of the regime. Starting in 1939, hundreds of thousands of German citizens with mental or physical disabilities were murdered in hospitals and asylums. Einsatzgruppen paramilitary death squads accompanied the German armed forces inside the occupied territories and conducted the mass killings of millions of Jews and other Holocaust victims. After 1941, millions of others were imprisoned, worked to death, or murdered in Nazi concentration camps and extermination camps. This genocide is known as the Holocaust.

=== Japan (1926–1945) ===
Right-wing elements in Japan, including industrialists, military officers, and the nobility, had long opposed democracy as an anathema to national unity. Military cliques began to dominate the national government starting in the 1930s. A major militarist nationalist movement which existed in Japan from the 1920s to the 1930s was the Imperial Way Faction, or "Kodoha". In 1936, Japan and Germany signed the Anti-Comintern Pact, aimed at countering the Soviet Union and the Communist International. In 1940, Prime Minister Fumimaro Konoe established the Imperial Rule Assistance Association, or the Taisei Yokusankai, to consolidate all political parties under a single umbrella group. That same year, Japan joined Germany and Italy by signing the Tripartite Pact.

== Fascism in contemporary and transitional liberal democracies ==
Fascist, quasi-fascist, and proto-fascist movements have emerged within democratic nations, often drawing ideological inspiration from regimes established by Mussolini and Hitler. In some cases, these movements have contributed to democratic backsliding, actively undermining liberal democratic norms and threatening the continued functioning of these countries as liberal democracies altogether.

=== Australia (1931–1940s) ===
The New Guard was founded in Sydney in 1931 and was opposed to the rule of the then New South Wales premier Jack Lang. The organisation was pro-Monarchy and anti-Communist and was led by World War I veteran Eric Campbell. At its height, the New Guard had a membership of over 50,000 and was almost exclusively based in New South Wales. Following the dismissal of the Lang government in 1932, the New Guard lost much of its momentum and officially disbanded in 1935.

Another Fascist movement was the short-lived antisemitic, anti-Communist and Nazi-inspired Australia First Movement founded by former communist Percy Stephensen. The organisation was founded in October 1941 and existed until March 1942 when it was suppressed by Australian security agencies who believed the movement was supportive of the Axis Powers. Its leaders (including Stephensen) and several members were also interned.

A small Nazi movement was founded among South Australia's ethnic German Australian community by Johannes Becker, a German migrant who arrived in Australia in 1927. Becker had joined the NSDAP in 1932 and was appointed State Leader (Landeskreisleiter) for the South Pacific the following year. Following the outbreak of World War II, Becker was interned and released in 1946, then deported to West Germany the following year.

=== Belgium (1930s–1945) ===
The Rexist movement and the Vlaamsch Nationaal Verbond party achieved some electoral success in the 1930s. The party could be labeled as clerical fascist with its roots in Catholic conservatism. The party gained rapid support for a brief period, focusing on the secularism, corruption, and ineffectiveness on parliamentary democracy in Belgium. Many of its members assisted the Nazi occupation during World War II. The Verdinaso movement, too, can be considered fascist. Its leader, Joris Van Severen, was killed before the Nazi occupation. Some of its adepts collaborated, but others joined the resistance. These collaborationist movements are generally classified as belonging to the National Socialist model or the German fascist model because of its brand of racial nationalism and the close relation with the occupational authorities.

=== Canada (1930s–1940) ===
In the 1930s, Canada had fascist fringe groups within it. One stronger group was the Parti national social chrétien of Adrien Arcand which had significant support. Arcand believed in the anti-Semitic policies of Hitler and called himself the "Canadian Führer". In 1934, his Quebec-based party merged with the fascist, western-based Nationalist Party of Canada. In 1938, the English Canadian and French Canadian fascist movements united into the National Unity Party. In 1940, all fascist parties were banned under Canada's War Measures Act.

=== Chile (1932–1938) ===
In Chile, during the 1930s, there was a fascist party named National Socialist Movement of Chile (MNS), ruled by Jorge González von Marées, a Hitler sympathizer. However, the MNS was dissolved in 1938.

Esoteric Nazi Miguel Serrano gathered a following of Nazis, fascists and far-right occultists in Chile.

=== Finland (1929–1932) ===
The Lapua Movement, established in 1929, originally a nationalist movement that opposed Sweden and Russia, turned into a fascist movement in the early 1930s whose members were infamous for their violent and brutal methods. However, the party's origins could date back to the early 1920s, in anti-communist forces during the Finnish Civil War. They attempted a coup d'état in 1932, after which the movement was banned. The Lapua Movement, however, affected the selection of Pehr Evind Svinhufvud as the president and the passing of extensive anti-communist laws. Finland stayed a democracy throughout World War II, despite co-operating with Nazi Germany.

=== Ireland (1932–1933) ===
Fascist sympathizers led by General Eoin O'Duffy established the Army Comrades Association, or "Blueshirts" in 1932 as a veterans organization. Renamed the National Guard, it provided physical protection for political groups such as Cumann na nGaedheal from intimidation and attacks by the IRA. The Blueshirts wanted to establish a corporate state in Ireland and frequently clashed with Republican supporters of the ruling Fianna Fáil, who were using force to disrupt that party's meetings. O'Duffy planned a parade in Dublin in 1933, and the government, fearing a coup, banned the organization. In response to the banning of the National Guard, Cumann na nGaedheal and the National Centre Party merged to form a new party, Fine Gael, on 3 September 1933. Former Blueshirts under O'Duffy's leadership later fought for Franco during the Nationalist uprising in Spain.

=== Lebanon ===
In Lebanon, the Kataeb Party (Phalange) was formed in 1936, with inspiration of the Spanish Falange and Italian fascism. The founder of the party, Pierre Gemayel, founded the party after returning from a visit at the 1936 Summer Olympics. The party is still active today, although it has abandoned the Falangist and Fascist ideology in place of Phoenicianism, social conservatism, republicanism, and Christian fundamentalism.

=== Mexico (1930–1942) ===
A reactionary nationalist movement called Acción Revolucionaria Mexicana (Mexican Revolutionary Action), founded by former Villista general Nicolas Rodriguez Carrasco, agitated for right-wing causes, such as the deportation of Jews and Chinese-Mexicans, throughout the 1930s. ARM maintained a paramilitary force called the Goldshirts, which clashed frequently with Communist activists, and supported the presidential faction of Plutarco Calles against the socialist reformist president Lázaro Cárdenas. The paramilitary group was banned in 1936 and the ARM officially disbanded in 1942, when Mexico declared war against the Axis.

=== The Netherlands (1923–1945) ===
The Verbond van Actualisten (Union of Actualists) was the oldest fascist movement in the Netherlands. It was established on 22 January 1923 and its ideology was based on Mussolini's Italian fascist movement. It ceased all activities in November 1928 after having had no success at all. It was succeeded by the Vereeniging De Bezem (Association 'The Broom') which was founded on 15 December 1928 by some men who previously were active in the Verbond van Actualisten. Its aim was to clean Dutch politics – hence the name. Its downfall in 1932 was caused by continuous discord between its leaders.

On 14 December 1931 Anton Mussert and Cornelis van Geelkerken founded the Nationaal-Socialistische Beweging in Nederland (NSB), the National Socialist Movement in the Netherlands. It started as a fascist movement, Italian style, with an ideology also based on Hitler's NSDAP. In the years 1935–1936 the party embraced antisemitism. Its best pre-war election result was 7.9% of the voters (1935). The maximum number of member of the NSB was 100,000 (around 1.25% of the Dutch population). Soon after the German occupation in May 1940 the NSB became the only allowed political party. During WWII the NSB was never given any real power, and instead, the Germans used the NSB for their own purposes. After the German defeat, the NSB disappeared.

On 29 June 1932 Jan Baars (previously active in the Vereeniging 'De Bezem') founded the Algemeene Nederlandsche Fascisten Bond (General Dutch Fascist Federation). It was the first Dutch fascist political party to gain significant election results and it had a considerable number of members. Its political views were quite moderate and it disapproved of German Nazi racism and antisemitism. It ended its existence in 1934. Its main successful successor was Zwart Front (Black Front), 1934–1941. Its leaders were of a Catholic origin and the party was strongly based on Italian fascism. During the pre-war period, it never established a prominent position like Mussert's NSB. After the German invasion in May 1940, the number of members rose from 4,000 to 12,000. The Germans prohibited Zwart Front in December 1941.

Other, smaller, fascist and Nazi parties were: Verbond van Nationalisten (Union of Nationalists, 1928–1934), the Nationaal-Socialistische Nederlandsche Arbeiders Partij (National Socialist Dutch Workers Party, 1931–1941), Nationaal-Socialistische Partij (National Socialist Party, 1932–1941), Nederlandsche Fascisten Unie (Dutch Fascist Union, 1933), Unie van Nederlandsche Fascisten (Union of Dutch Fascists, 1933), Oranje-Fascisten (Orange Fascists, 1933), Frysk Fascisten Front (Frisian Fascist Front, 1933), Corporatieve Concentratie (Corporative Concentration, 1933–1934), Verbond voor Nationaal Herstel (Union for National Restoration, 1933–1941), Nederlandsche Nationaal-Socialistische Partij (Dutch National Socialist Party, 1935) and the Nederlandsche Volkspartij (Dutch People's Party, 1938–1940).

Dutch fascism and Nazism is known for its lack of coherence and it was dominated by the egos of its leaders. An important fact for its marginal position in pre-war Dutch politics was the absence of a 'lost generation' of combatants of WWI.

=== Sweden (1926–1929) ===
The Sveriges Fascistiska Folkparti (SFF; "Fascist People's Party of Sweden") was founded in 1926. Major figures of the party included its founding leader, Konrad Hallgren, a former German officer, and Swedish soldiers Sven Olov Lindholm and Sven Hedengren.

In 1929 a delegation of the party, led by Hallgren and Lindholm, attended a major rally of the German Nazi party, at Nuremberg. Afterwards, the SFF was more strongly influenced by Nazism and changed its name to Sveriges Nationalsocialistiska Folkparti (SNF; Swedish National Socialist People's Party). The SNF was one of several Swedish Nazi parties.

=== United Kingdom (1932–1940) ===
Sir Oswald Mosley, an admirer of Mussolini, established the British Union of Fascists in 1932 as a nationalist alternative to the three mainstream political parties in Britain. Even though the BUF only acquired a limited amount of success in some local elections, its existence caused frequent riots, the riots were usually instigated by members and supporters of Communist movements. Alarmed by the violence which was caused by the BUF, in 1936, the government passed the Public Order Act to restrict its activity. During the latter years of the decade, the party experienced a revival in popularity on the back of its anti-war campaign. The BUF was banned in 1940 and Mosley was interned for the duration of the war. The relative stability of democratic institutions, the long-time assimilation of Jews, and the lack of a strong, threatening Communist movement, had made it difficult for fascism to succeed in Britain.

=== United States (1933-1941) ===
The Louisiana governor and politician Huey Long built a powerful state machine and at the time of his assassination in 1935, he was building a national following. Experts on the far left and the far right called him a fascist. Some historians reject this designation.

In the late 1930s, some pro-German organizations seemed comfortable with fascist ideals. The Silver Legion of America (1933-1941), claiming to have around 15,000 members, managed to run a candidate for President on a third-party ticket, but it was outlawed after Nazi Germany's declaration of war on the United States in December 1941. The German-American Bund openly supported Nazi Germany, and, like the Silver Legion, it was banned during World War II. Charles Coughlin, a Roman Catholic priest, used his nationally syndicated radio show to promote antisemitic and pro-fascist views.

== Fascism in other countries ==
=== Austria (1933–1938) ===
Engelbert Dollfuß's idea of a "Ständestaat" was borrowed from Mussolini. Dollfuß dissolved parliament and established a clerical-fascist dictatorship which lasted until Austria was incorporated into Nazi Germany through the Anschluss of 1938.

=== Brazil (1932–1938) ===
Briefly, the regime of Getúlio Vargas aligned with Plínio Salgado's Integralist Party, a Brazilian "fascist" movement. Later Vargas launched his own cult of personality, and took inspiration from Mussolini in a number of areas, such as labor law. The Brazilian Consolidation of Labor Laws, a decree issued by Vargas in 1943, has been described as partly inspired by Mussolini's laws of 1927.

There are debates about whether the Vargas government was fascist or not. Some scholars have argued Vargas's leadership was clearly a version of fascism or drew substantial inspiration from fascism. Others argue against this position from the fact that Vargas followed the Caudillismo ideology, which is strongly Positivist, described as incompatible with Fascism's metaphysical, traditionalist, almost occultist ideas. Vargas also led Brazil to join the Allied side and declared war on the fascist Axis alliance in WW2. Brazil sent Expeditionary Forces to help the Allies on multiple fronts.

=== China (1925–1949) ===
The Kuomintang, a Chinese nationalist political party, had a history of fascism or fascist influences under Chiang Kai-shek's leadership. The Blue Shirts Society, a fascist paramilitary organization within the KMT that modeled itself after Mussolini's blackshirts, was anti-foreign and anti-communist, and it stated that its agenda was to end the influences of foreign (Japanese and Western) imperialists in China, crush Communism, and eliminate feudalism. In addition to being anti-communist, some KMT members, like Chiang Kai-shek's right-hand man Dai Li were anti-American, and wanted to expel American influence. Close Sino-German ties also promoted cooperation between the Nationalist Government and Nazi Germany.

The New Life Movement was a government-led civic movement in 1930s China initiated by Chiang Kai-shek to promote cultural reform and Neo-Confucian social morality and to ultimately unite China under a centralised ideology following the emergence of ideological challenges to the status quo. The Movement attempted to counter threats of Western and Japanese imperialism through a resurrection of traditional Chinese morality, which it held to be superior to modern Western values. As such the Movement was based upon Confucianism, mixed with Christianity, nationalism and authoritarianism that have some similarities to fascism. It rejected individualism and liberalism, while also opposing socialism and communism.

There is debate among scholars on whether Chiang Kai-shek's Nationalist regime was fascist. Some historians such as Jay Taylor argued that Chiang's ideology does not expouse fascism. Other historians regard this movement as imitating Nazism and being a neo-nationalistic movement used to elevate Chiang's control of everyday lives. Frederic Wakeman suggested that the New Life Movement was "Confucian fascism". Other historians argue that despite Chiang's flaws and his authoritarian rule, his regime did not espouse the fascist ideology of totalitarianism and ultranationalism. Chiang repeatedly attacked his enemies such as the Empire of Japan as fascistic and ultra-militaristic. The Sino-German relationship also rapidly deteriorated as Germany failed to pursue a detente between China and Japan, which led to the outbreak of the Second Sino-Japanese War. China later declared war on fascist countries, including Germany, Italy, and Japan, as part of Declarations of war during World War II.

During World War II, the Wang Jingwei regime was a puppet state of the Empire of Japan established in 1940 in Japanese-occupied eastern China. The official name of this state was simply the Republic of China, but it is widely known as the "Wang Jingwei regime" so as to distinguish it from the Nationalist government of the Republic of China under Chiang Kai-shek, which was fighting with the Allies of World War II against Japan. Wang Jingwei was a high-ranking former Kuomintang (KMT) official, a rival of Chiang Kai-shek and a member of the pro-peace faction of the KMT. He defected to the Japanese side and formed a collaborationist government in occupied Nanjing in 1940. The new state claimed the entirety of China during its existence, but effectively only Japanese-occupied territory was under its direct control. Its diplomatic recognition was limited to other members of the Anti-Comintern Pact, of which it was a signatory. Wang Jingwei supported Hitler and Mussolini's ideals of a fascist state.

=== Croatia (1941–1945) ===
Poglavnik Ante Pavelić, leader of the infamous Ustaše movement, came to power in 1941 as the Croatian puppet leader under the control of Nazi Germany. Under the indirect control of Germany, the Ustaše regime was based heavily upon both clerical fascism and the Italian model of fascism, with elements of racial integrity and organic nationalism drawn from Nazism.

=== France (1940–1944) ===
The Vichy regime of Philippe Pétain, established following France's defeat by Germany, collaborated with the Nazis. However, the minimal importance of fascists in the government until its direct occupation by Germany makes it appear to seem more similar to the regime of Franco or Salazar than the model fascist powers. While it has been argued that anti-Semitic raids performed by the Vichy regime were more in the interests of pleasing Germany than in service of ideology, anti-semitism was a full component of the "National Revolution" ideology of Vichy.

As early as October 1940 the Vichy regime introduced the infamous statut des Juifs, that produced a new legal definition of Jewishness and which barred Jews from certain public offices. They interned Liberals, Communists, Jews, Gypsies, and homosexuals in concentration camps as soon as 1940.

Also, in May 1941 the Parisian police force had collaborated in the internment of foreign Jews. As a means of identifying Jews, the German authorities required all Jews in the occupied zone to wear a yellow badge. On the 11 June, they demanded that 100,000 Jews be handed over for deportation.

The most infamous of these mass arrests was the so-called Vel' d'Hiv Roundup (Rafle du Vel' d'Hiv) which took place in Paris on the 16 and 17 July 1942. The Vélodrome d'Hiver was a large cycle track situated on the rue Nélaton near the Quai de Grenelle in the 15th arrondissement of Paris. In a vast operation codenamed "Spring Breeze" (Vent printanier), the French police rounded up 13,152 Jews from Paris and its surrounding suburbs. These were mostly adult men and women however approximately 4,000 children were among them. Identifications for the arrests were made easier by the large number of files on Jews compiled and held by Vichy authorities since 1940. The French police, headed by René Bousquet, were entirely responsible for this operation and no German soldiers assisted. Pierre Laval, head of Vichy, included the children in the deportations to Auschwitz against general German orders. Most of the deportees sealed in the transports died en route due to lack of food or water. The few survivors were sent to the gas chambers. A few months later, a police operation took place in Marseille, known as the Battle of Marseille, and led to massive raids in the so-called "free zone", administrated by Vichy.

=== Greece (1936–1941) ===
The dictatorship of Ioannis Metaxas from 1936 to 1941, known as the 4th of August Regime, was partly fascist in its ideological nature, and might hence be characterized as quasi-fascist or authoritarian. It had a National Youth Organisation based on the Hitlerjugend, developed an armaments-centered economy, established a police-state akin to that of Nazi Germany (Greece received tactical and material support from Himmler, who exchanged correspondence with the Greek Minister of State Security Konstantinos Maniadakis) and brutality against communists in big cities such as Athens (communism was not known in the small towns and villages of Greece yet). The Colonel George Papadopoulos' 1967 to 1974 military dictatorship, which was supported by the United States, however, was less ideological and lacked a clear fascist element other than militarism.

=== Hungary (1932–1945) ===
By 1932, support for extremist ideology, embodied by Prime Minister Gyula Gömbös, had reached the point where Hungarian Regent Miklós Horthy could not postpone appointing a fascist prime minister. Horthy also showed signs of admiring the efficiency and conservative leanings of the Italian fascist state under Mussolini and was not too reluctant to appoint a fascist government (with terms for the extent of Horthy's power). Horthy would keep control over the mainstream fascist movement in Hungary until near the end of the Second World War. However, Gömbös never had a truly powerful fascist base of support. Instead, the radical Arrow Cross Party, which gained support in Budapest as well as the countryside, became a powerful political movement, gaining nearly 800,000 votes in the election of 1939. Horthy became paranoid due to his new rival, and imprisoned the Arrow Cross Party's leader, Ferenc Szálasi. However, this action only increased popular support for the fascist movement. In another attempt to challenge the Arrow Cross, Horthy's government began to imitate the Arrow Cross Party's ideology. Starting in 1938, several racial laws, mostly against Jews, were passed by the regime, but the extremist Arrow Cross Party, led by Ferenc Szálasi, was banned until German pressure lifted the law, and until Germany occupied Hungary during Operation Margarethe on 19 March 1944, no Jews were in direct danger of being annihilated. In July 1944, armor-colonel Ferenc Koszorús and the First Armour Division, under Horthy's orders, resisted the Arrow Cross militia and prevented the deportation of the Jews of Budapest, thus saved over 200,000 lives. This act impressed upon the German occupying forces, including Adolf Eichmann, that as long as Hungary continued to be governed by Horthy, no real Endlösung could begin. Following Horthy's attempt to have Hungary jump out of the war on 15 October, Szálasi, with German military support, launched Operation Panzerfaust and replaced Admiral Horthy as Head of State. The regime changed to a system more in line with Nazism and would remain this way until the capture of Budapest by Soviet troops. Over 400,000 Jews were sent by Hungary to German death camps from 1944 to 1945.

=== Italian Regency of Carnaro (1919-1920) ===
On 8 September 1920, Gabriele D'Annunzio proclaimed the city of Fiume to be under the control of the Italian Regency of Carnaro with himself as dictator.

Benito Mussolini was influenced by portions of the regency's constitution, and by D'Annunzio's style of leadership as a whole. D'Annunzio has been described as the "John the Baptist of Italian Fascism," as virtually the entire ritual of Fascism was invented by D'Annunzio during his occupation of Fiume and his leadership of the Italian Regency of Carnaro, including the balcony address, the Roman salute, the cries of "Eia, eia, eia! Alala!" taken from Achilles' cry in the Iliad, the dramatic and rhetorical dialogue with the crowd, and the use of religious symbols in new secular settings.

=== Norway (1942–1945) ===
Vidkun Quisling had staged a coup d'état during the German invasion on 9 April 1940. This first government was replaced by a Nazi puppet government under his leadership from 1 February 1942. His party, the Nasjonal Samling, never had any substantial support in Norway, undermining his attempts to emulate the Italian fascist state.

=== Portugal (1933–1974) ===
The Estado Novo regime of António de Oliveira Salazar borrowed many of the ideas towards military and governance from Mussolini's Fascist regime and adapted to the Portuguese example of paternal iconography for authoritarianism. However Salazar distanced himself from fascism and Nazism, which he criticized as a "pagan Caesarism" that recognized neither legal, religious nor moral limits. Unlike Mussolini or Hitler, Salazar never had the intention to create a party-state. Salazar was against the whole-party concept and in 1930 he created the National Union a single-party, which he marketed as a "non-party", announcing that the National Union would be the antithesis of a political party. Salazar's aim was the depoliticization of society not the mobilization of populace. Salazar promoted Catholicism, but argued that the role of the Church was social, not political, and negotiated the Concordat of 1940.

The other fascist movement was the National Syndicalists, also called the "Blue Shirts" (camisas azuis), who were active briefly between 1932 and 1934. Following the tradition of uniformed right-wing paramilitary groups, the Blue Shirts were an organisation advocating syndicalism and unionism, inspired by Benito Mussolini's brand of Italian Fascism. As Francisco Rolão Preto wrote in July 1922, "our organic syndicalism is essentially the basis of current syndicalist thought among Mussolini's friends". MNS was also built on previous allegiances to Integralismo Lusitano, but it was not inspired by the Action Française as alleged by their adversaries.

The leader Francisco Rolão Preto advocated the personalism of Emmanuel Mounier and some of the aspects of unionism. His unionist platform was based on leftist ideas of social justice, such as "a minimum family wage", "paid holidays", "working class education", and a world in which workers are "guaranteed the right to happiness".

In 1934, Salazar banned the National Syndicalists. Salazar denounced the National Syndicalists as "inspired by certain foreign models" and condemned their "exaltation of youth, the cult of force through direct action, the principle of the superiority of state political power in social life, and the propensity for organising masses behind a single leader". However, Salazar adopted many of the traits he criticized the National Syndicalists for. Most of the National Syndicalists eventually joined the National Union, the party of the Estado Novo regime.

=== Poland (1930s) ===
During the 1930s, the rise of fascist-inspired organizations occurred in Poland. Fascist organizations like the Association of Polish Fascists (Związek Faszystów Polskich) were however marginal and ephemeral. Fascist-inspired organizations were however stronger than parties with clearly fascist programs. National Radical Camp Falanga was the most prominent of them. It was created by radical youth members with National Democratic origins. Falanga was nonetheless quickly banned by the authoritarian ruling Sanacja regime and continued to operate clandestinely. It was also involved in frequent street violence and anti-Semitic riots.

=== Romania (1940–1944) ===
The Iron Guard turned more and more into a pro-Nazi and pro-German movement and took power in September 1940 when Ion Antonescu forced King Carol II to abdicate. However, the cohabitation between the Iron Guard and Ion Antonescu was short-lived.

During the 1930s, the group combined a mix of Christian faith, antisemitism, and calls for land reform for farmers, who still lived in a quasi-feudal society. However, although widely popular for a period of time, the extremely violent and fanatically "death-romanticist" nature of the movement made it difficult for the Iron Guard to attract conservatives and middle class people, and as a result, the movement could never be as successful as the Nazi Party.

The Antonescu regime that followed had elements of fascism, but it lacked a clear political program or party. It was more a military dictatorship. The regime was characterized by nationalism, antisemitism, and anti-communism, but had no social program. Despite the Iaşi pogrom and a near-liquidation of the Jews of many parts of Moldavia, the regime ultimately refused to send the Romanian Jews to German death camps. The regime was overthrown on 23 August 1944 in a coup led by the king Mihai of Romania.

=== Slovakia (1939–1945) ===
The Slovak People's Party was a quasi-fascist nationalist movement. It was associated with the Roman Catholic Church and founded by Father Andrej Hlinka. His successor Monsignor Jozef Tiso was a president of nominally independent Slovakia in 1939–1945. His government colleagues like Vojtech Tuka or Alexander Mach collaborate with fascism. The clerical element lends comparison with Austrofascism or the clerical fascism of Croatia, though not to the excesses of either model. The market system was run on principles agreeing with the standard Italian fascist model of industrial regulation.

=== Spain (1936–1975) ===
After the 1936 arrest and execution of its founder, José Antonio Primo de Rivera, during the Spanish Civil War, the fascist Falange Española Party was allied to and ultimately came to be dominated by Generalísimo Francisco Franco, who became known as El Caudillo, the undisputed leader of the Nationalist side in the war and, after victory, head of state until his death over 35 years later.

=== South Africa (1930s–1940s) ===
There have been several waves of fascism in South Africa. Beginning with D F Malan's support of Hitler's brown shirts and the activities of Robey Leibbrandt in the 1930s and 1940s. The Ossewabrandwag was a far-right movement of mostly Afrikaners who opposed South Africa's participation in World War II and was sympathetic to the Nazi and Fascist regimes in Europe. In 1942 the future Apartheid-era Prime Minister of South Africa, BJ Vorster was appointed a 'General' of the Ossewabrandwag. Vorster declared:

"We stand for Christian Nationalism which is an ally of National Socialism. You can call this anti-democratic principle dictatorship if you wish. In Italy it is called Fascism, in Germany National Socialism and in South Africa, Christian Nationalism."

The Ossewabrandwag led insurrections against the Union government, resulting in some of the leadership, including Vorster, to be detained under emergency regulations. Towards the end of the war they were paroled on house arrest.

When the National Party came to power in the 1948 election, former members of the Ossewabrandwag became members of the new government.

The election of 1948 saw the installation of Apartheid, which dramatically strengthened the racial hierarchy of the country. Policies such as the Group Areas Act and the Pass Laws were implemented with high degrees of state violence. Fundamental human rights were heavily curtailed or removed entirely. These included: free speech, freedom of movement, right of assembly, and right to privacy. Whilst elections were held on a regular basis, the system was marred by gerrymandering and restructured weighting of voting districts. Previously enshrined constitutional rights were slowly eroded over time, most significantly when they NP controlled Parliament installed a new, higher court of law (High Court of Parliament) to overturn decisions of the Supreme Court.

Interned alongside BJ Vorster in 1942 was another Ossewabrandwag member Hendrik Johan van den Bergh who eventually went on to found the Bureau of State Security (BOSS), an intelligence agency created by the government on 16 May 1969 to coordinate military and domestic intelligence. Van den Bergh was to become known as the "tall assassin" given his physical height. BOSS was later subsumed by the Civil Co-operation Bureau which oversaw the death squads of Vlakplaas and conducted other forms of state violence.

A later wave of fascism during the 1970s and 1980s created fringe right-wing groups such as the Afrikaner Weerstandsbeweging.

=== Yugoslavia (1935–1939) ===
Yugoslav Radical Union was a Yugoslav fascist group run by Milan Stojadinović. Party members wore green shirt uniforms, addressed Stojadinović as Vodja and used the Roman salute. The party was dissolved following the Axis invasion of Yugoslavia.

== See also ==
- Anti-fascism
- Christian fascism
- Clerical fascism
- Donald Trump and fascism
- Fascism in Asia
- Fascism in Europe
- Fascism in North America
- Fascism in South America
- Fascist International
- Grand Council of Fascism
- Hindutva
- Neo-fascism
- Sangh Parivar

== Notes ==
=== Cited sources ===
- Gallagher, Tom (2020). Salazar : the dictator who refused to die. C Hurst & Co Publishers Ltd. ISBN 9781787383883.
- Kay, Hugh (1970). Salazar and Modern Portugal. New York: Hawthorn Books.
