= Swedish National Socialist Unity Party =

Political party in Sweden

Swedish National Socialist Unity Party poster, announcing a public meeting in Gothenburg. The meeting was titled 'Political Trial', in which the party would present accusations against the Marxist and Right-wing leaders. The main speakers of the event was K. Hallonsten and J. Eliasson.

The Swedish National Socialist Unity Party (Swedish: Svenska nationalsocialistiska samlingspartiet) was a National Socialist political party in Sweden. The party was born out of a split in the Swedish National Socialist Party in October 1933, as the Gothenburg-based Party Staff (partistaben) of SNSP declared the party leader Birger Furugård expelled from the party. Furugård was however able to isolate the Party Staff faction, and retained a majority of the party membership. The Party Staff regrouped as the Swedish National Socialist Unity Party (commonly nicknamed SNSP-staben). The Party Staff group continued to publish Vår Kamp as its party organ.

In December 1933 the Skanör-Falsterbo branch of the party broke away and formed a party of its own.

In late 1933 the Swedish National Socialist Unity Party merged into the National Socialist Bloc.
