= Nasisten =

- Type: Weekly
- Editor: J. Levin
- Founded: September 1933
- Ceased publication: April 1934
- Political alignment: Nazism
- Headquarters: Malmö

Nasisten ('The Nazi') was a Nazi weekly newspaper published in Malmö, Sweden, between September 1933 and April 1934.

== History and profile ==
When a first issue of Nasisten was published in September 1933, it was aligned with the National Socialist League. It became an organ for the Swedish National Socialist Unity (formed by National Socialist branches in Skåne in October 1933), then becoming a regional organ of the National Socialist Bloc. It later changed allegiance to the movement of Birger Furugård.

Nasisten carried the by-line 'Organ for the National Socialists of southern Sweden'. J. Levin was the editor of Nasisten.
