= Easter Riots =

1943 clashes between Nazis and anti-fascists in Sweden

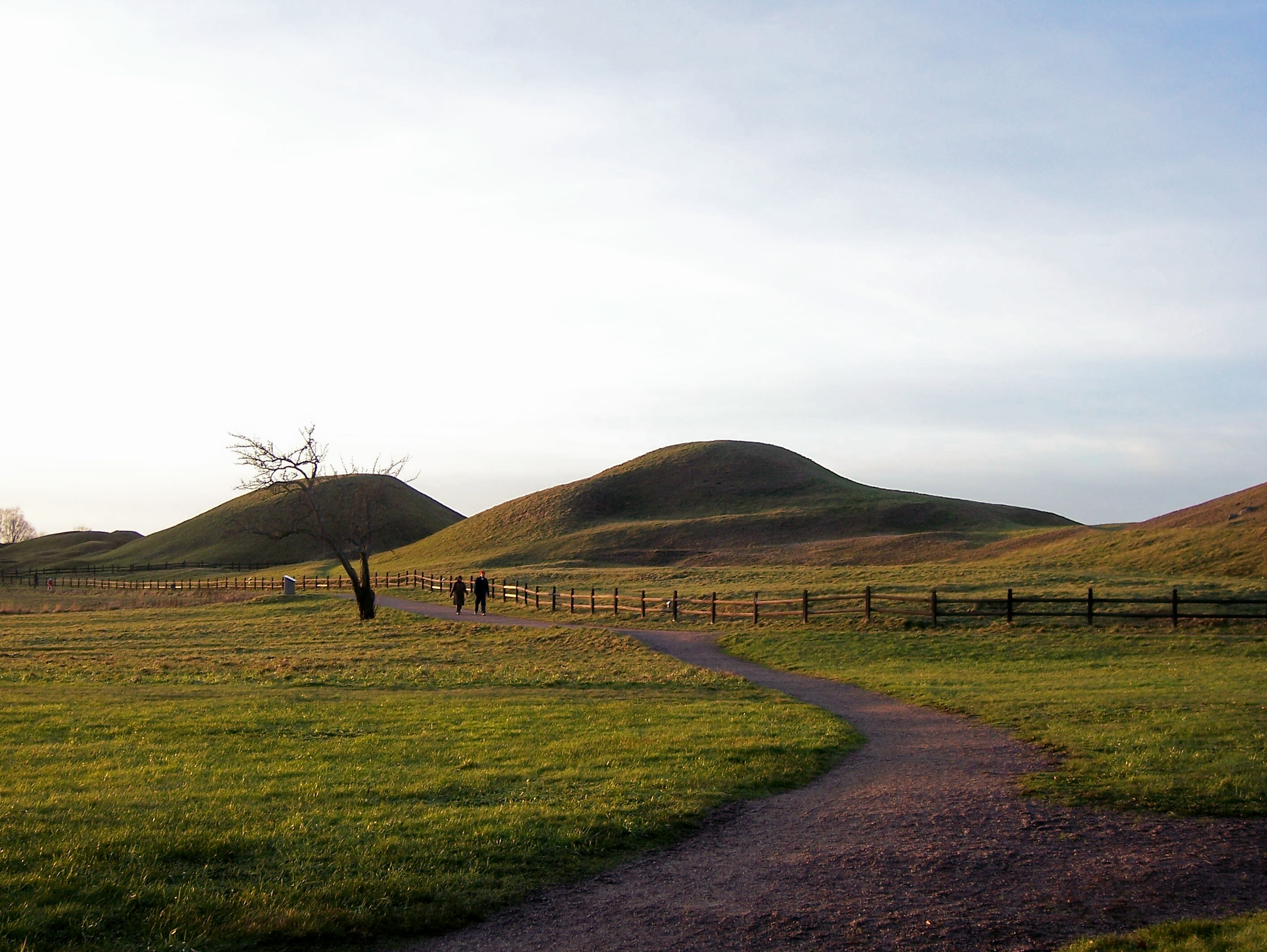
- The Royal Mounds, 2006
- Date: 26 April 1943
- Location: Gamla Uppsala

Parties
Swedish Socialist Union	Anti-fascists

Number
Unknown	Several thousand

The Easter Riots (Swedish: Påskkravallerna) is the name given to a period of unrest in Uppsala, Sweden, during the Easter of 1943. The fascist group Swedish Socialist Union (SSS, Swedish: Svensk Socialistisk Samling, previously the National Socialist Workers' Party) held its national congress in Uppsala, amid the Second World War and only days after the Warsaw Ghetto Uprising. The unrest climaxed on 26 April, when the SSS ended the congress by holding a demonstration at the Royal Mounds of Old Uppsala.

Thousands of anti-fascists gathered to protest against the Nazi gathering at the Royal Mounds, a historical site that held much political symbolism among Swedish nationalists. Policemen had been called in from Stockholm to defend the demonstration, and after the situation became increasingly tense they resorted to violence, dispersing the protesting crowds and onlookers alike with heavy force.

== 4 Days in April ==
In addition to writing a book about it, the historian and playwright Magnus Alkarp has depicted the riots in a play, 4 dagar i april. The play, produced by the Uppsala City Theatre and directed by Sara Cronberg, was put on in 2012. Alkarp received death threats from the Swedish Resistance Movement, a militant neo-Nazi group, after the play's premier.

== See also ==
- Nazism in Sweden
