= Swedish National Socialist Unity =

Nazi political party in Sweden

Swedish National Socialist Unity (Swedish: Svensk nationalsocialistisk samling) was a Skåne-based Nazi political party in Sweden. Swedish National Socialist Unity was formed by party branches in Skåne of the Swedish National Socialist Party, that had taken part in a rebellion against the party leader Birger Furugård. Nasisten was the organ of the group. The group used a swastika as its symbol. The group merged into the National Socialist Bloc later the same year.
