= Nationen (weekly newspaper) =

Defunct newspaper/magazine in Sweden (1925–1941)

- Type: Weekly newspaper; Bimonthly magazine
- Founder: Elof Eriksson
- Founded: 1925
- Ceased publication: 1941
- Political alignment: Far-right
- Language: Swedish
- Headquarters: Stockholm
- Country: Sweden

Nationen (Swedish: The Nation) was a weekly fascist newspaper which was in circulation in the period 1925–1941. During its lifetime the paper was the most popular and most read antisemitic publication in Sweden.

== History and profile ==
Nationen was established by Elof Eriksson, one of the fascist politicians in Sweden, in 1925. In the first issue Eriksson declared the goal of the paper as to protect Swedish culture and its values against the threats of the modern developments and modernity. The paper also supported the idea that Sweden should be freed from the yoke of Jewish cosmopolitanism. The readers of Nationen were predominantly middle-class Swede men and also those living abroad. The paper was first close to Fascist People's Party of Sweden and then, to Frihetsrörelsen which was founded in 1937.

Most of the articles published in Nationen were written by Elof Eriksson. However, there were other contributors, including Hans Günther, a German expat, and Herman Lundborg, a Swede eugenicist. An anti-semitic document entitled The Protocols of the Elders of Zion was published several times in Nationen which was circulated in public until 1935 when its public distribution was banned due to its harsh criticisms over freemasonry. Then the paper was sold through subscription and distributed via Nazi parties in the country. At the end of the 1930s the paper enjoyed highest circulation levels selling nearly 30,000 copies. Eriksson attempted to publish the paper on a daily basis, but managed to publish it as a weekly publication. In its last three years Nationen became a bi-monthly periodical and folded in 1941.
