= Swedish National Socialist Farmers' and Workers' Party =

Swedish National Socialist Farmers' and Workers' Party Svenska Nationalsocialistiska Bonde-och Arbetarpartiet
- Founder: Birger Furugård
- Founded: 12 August 1924
- Dissolved: 1930
- Merged into: Swedish National Socialist Party
- Newspaper: Nationalsocialisten
- Ideology: Nazism
- Political position: Far-right

The Swedish National Socialist Farmers' and Workers' Party (Swedish: Svenska Nationalsocialistiska Bonde-och Arbetarpartiet) was the first Nazi organization in Sweden.

== Founding ==
In 1923 Sigurd and Gunnar met with Adolf Hitler and Erich Ludendorff.

The organization was founded by Birger Furugård and his two brothers Sigurd and Gunnar, at a meeting in Älvdalen a year later on 12 August 1924 as the Swedish National Socialist Freedom League (Swedish: Svenska Nationalsocialistiska Frihetsförbundet). The group started the publication Nationalsocialisten, with Sigurd as its editor.

The organization was renamed to its final name the following year. The party largely remained confined to Värmland. The publication of Nationalsocialisten was discontinued.

In 1930 the party merged with the Fascist People's Party of Sweden of Sven Olov Lindholm, and formed the Swedish National Socialist Party (SNSP).
