= Elof Eriksson =

Swedish political writer (1883–1965)

- Born: 30 July 1883; Stockholm, Sweden
- Died: 9 December 1965 (aged 82); Stockholm, Sweden
- Occupation: Farm manager
- Years active: 1914–1965
- Notable work: Semi-Gotha (1941); Världskulturer(1962)
- Political party: Sveriges Fascistiska Folkparti
- Movement: Nationella Samlingsrörelsen
- Father: Jakob Eriksson

Elof Eriksson (30 July 1883 – 9 December 1965) was a Swedish antisemitic political writer. He was recognised as the main exponent of antisemitism in inter-war Sweden along with Einar Åberg.

== Early years ==
Born in Stockholm, his father Jakob Eriksson was a well-known plant pathologist. Raised on a large farm at Hyllie, Eriksson studied horticulture and agriculture before becoming farm manager of the family plot.

Eriksson began his political career in 1914 in the agrarian movements connected to the Jordbrukarnas Riksförbund (Farmers National Federation), leading a highly reactionary faction that was suspicious of democracy and was supportive of eugenics. He wrote a series for articles for Nya Dagligt Allehanda condemning liberalism and the Swedish party system, which he blamed for the problems facing Swedish agriculture and took part in the Farmers' March, a mass rally held on 6 February 1914. A meeting with Mauritz Rydgren in 1914 helped to instill in Eriksson a strong belief in antisemitism and Swedish racial purity although initially these were privately held beliefs that did not manifest in his political activities. He left active politics when the group as a whole merged with the Centre Party and became a writer and publisher, taking over the editing of the highly conservative Södertälje Tidning in 1923. It was whilst writing for this paper that he began to demonstrate his antisemitic opinions.

== Fascist politics ==
Eriksson was fired in 1925 for his extremist views and set up his own paper, the Nationen, which became the main outlet for his increasingly hard-line beliefs. The paper, which ran into the 1940s, averaged around 3000 in circulation and reached 10,000 at its peak, a high number for an extremist paper in Sweden at the time. Within the Nationen Eriksson was soon promoting both antisemitism and his strong support for Italian fascism. In 1926 he set up his own political movement, the National Unity Movement (Nationella Samlingsrörelsen), which espoused a strong state and anti-communism, but it proved short-lived. Nationen was eventually banned as extremist in 1935.

For a time he was a member of the Sveriges Fascistiska Folkparti although he clashed with other leaders such as Konrad Hallgren, Sven Hedengren and Sven Olov Lindholm due to their support for Nazism as well as personality issues. Despite his antisemitism, Eriksson rejected Nazism in part because he felt that it was revolutionary and he much preferred a highly reactionary approach to politics. Nonetheless he was in contact with individual Nazis, notably Erich Ludendorff and later Julius Streicher, with whom he shared a pathological hatred of the Jews. The links became stronger during the Second World War when he was involved in disseminating Nazi German propaganda in Sweden.

He continued to promote his antisemitic and racial purity goals in the post-war era, but had little influence in Sweden. Nonetheless he was close to the Carlberg Foundation and had contact with like-minded groups in Europe and North America, being active until his death in 1965.

== Ideology ==
A critic of modernity since his earliest years, Eriksson began to develop ideas that blamed a Jewish conspiracy on the modern world and this became the centre of his world view in later years. He predicted the rise of a new form of Nordic Christianity that would rid the faith of the influence of Judaism but argued that for this to happen a spiritual rebirth of the Nordic people was necessary. Therefore, for Eriksson racial consciousness, the struggle against the Jews, and antisemitism itself, were all ordained by God. He outlined much of his conspiracy theories in Semi-Gotha, a 1941 two-volume work on the history of Judaism in Sweden. His final written work, the 1962 book Världskulturer, provided a full discussion of his religio-philosophical approach to antisemitism. Virulently anti-communist, Eriksson was also strongly critical of what he dubbed "cosmopolitanism" and rich capitalists, with his written work frequently focusing attacks on the Bonnier and Wallenberg families, both leading industrial and banking families of Jewish origin.
