= Para-Nazism =

Ideologies or movements borrowing elements of Nazism

Para-Nazism refers to political movements, ideologies, or state policies that imitate key structural, authoritarian, or ideological elements of Nazism—such as antisemitism, völkisch concepts, or totalitarian control—while lacking or rejecting specific defining features of German National Socialism, particularly German pan-nationalism or loyalty to Adolf Hitler. In political science and historiography, the concept encompasses both 'para-fascist' authoritarian entities that adopted Nazi administrative or policy mechanisms, as well as 'genuine fascist' movements that modeled themselves after Nazism while asserting distinct non-German national identities.

== History ==
=== Interwar and wartime manifestations ===
Prior to 1945, several political movements across Europe and Asia incorporated organizational and ideological tropes modeled on German Nazism. In Central and Eastern Europe, groups such as the National Socialist Workers' Party in Poland and Pērkonkrusts in Latvia integrated Nazi-style antisemitism and totalist frameworks while maintaining distinct national identities separate from pan-German expansionism.

In the late 1930s, during the wartime period of the Empire of Japan, establishment insiders within the imperial leadership engineered a policy shift toward totalitarian control modeled directly on National Socialism. Scholar Masao Maruyama characterizes this adoption of state-directed Nazi techniques as "fascism from above", arguing that it is distinct from the more general "fascism from below".

=== Post-war developments ===
Following World War II, certain European neo-fascist movements exhibited crypto- or para-Nazi characteristics. These fringe movements borrowed selective elements of Nazi ideology and symbolism without fully embodying its historical state apparatus. Emerging primarily on the margins of Western European politics, these groups centered on working-class racism, youth alienation, and the adoption of Nazi iconography as an expression of political counterculture or psychopathology.

== See also ==
- Anti-Nazism
- Clerical fascism
- Neo-Nazism
- Para-fascism
- Right-wing populism
