= Vera Oredsson =

Swedish Nazi politician (born 1928)

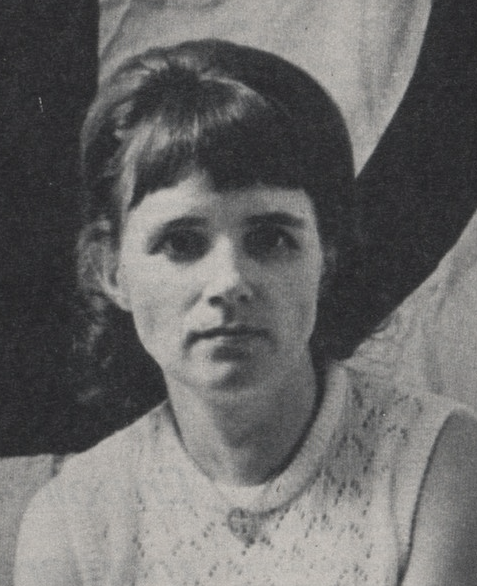
- Vera Oredsson in 1970
- Born: Vera Marta Birgitta Schimanski; 21 February 1928 (age 98); Berlin, Germany
- Other name: Vera Lindholm
- Known for: Activity in various Swedish neo-Nazi organizations; Second female party leader in Sweden
- Political party: NSDAP (1938–45); NRP (1960–2009); NRM (since 2010)
- Spouse(s): Sven-Olov Lindholm (1950–1962); Göran Assar Oredsson (?–2010)
- Children: 2

Vera Marta Birgitta Oredsson (née Schimanski, born 21 February 1928) is a German-born Nazi politician active in Sweden.

== Biography ==
=== Youth ===
Vera Oredsson's father was a German engineer, soldier and a member of the Storm Detachment, and she was herself a member of the League of German Girls, the female wing of the Hitler Youth of the National Socialist German Workers' Party. During the Battle of Berlin, her family's home was hit by a firebomb. With her brother, the journalist Folke Schimanski, and their Swedish mother, she arrived in Sweden in April 1945 as a refugee via White Buses.

=== Life in Sweden ===
In Sweden, Oredsson married Sven-Olov Lindholm, the leader of the Nazi-party Swedish Socialist Union, in 1950. They divorced in 1962, and she then married Göran Assar Oredsson, the leader of the Nordic Realm Party.

=== Political activism ===
In 1960, Oredsson joined the Nordic Realm Party (then known as the National Socialist Combat League of Sweden) and became its party secretary in 1962. In 1975, she succeeded her husband as the party's leader, and is therefore Sweden's second female party leader, after Asta Gustafsson. Just a few years after, however, in 1978, her husband became the party's leader again.

Oredsson was charged in 1973 for breaking the law for political uniforms when she, her husband and Deputy Party leader Heinz Burgmeister wore armbands with swastikas. Oredsson claimed that the Swastika was not a political symbol, rather a spiritual one, and said that the armbands were only worn on private land. Varberg's District Court acquitted them.

After the murder of two homosexuals in Gothenburg by neo-Nazis in the mid-1980s, Oredsson defended the murder, saying "It was cleansing. We don't regard homosexuals as human beings."

On 27 February 2018, Oredsson was found guilty of inciting racial hatred after allegedly giving a Nazi salute at one of the Nordic Resistance Movement's demonstrations in Borlänge but was later acquitted by Svea Court of Appeal.

In the 2018 election in Sweden, Oredsson ran for parliament, representing the Nordic Resistance Movement. Had the list won seats, she would have become the oldest member of parliament at 90, being five years older than Liberal Barbro Westerholm, then the oldest MP.

=== Media appearance ===
Oredsson appeared in a documentary by NRK, the public broadcasting company of Norway, titled "Rasekrigerne" ("The Race Warriors"). The documentary was a collection of footage of demonstrations, activism and interviews from the Nordic Resistance Movement, a neo-Nazi organization that Oredsson is currently a member of. In the documentary, she mourns her deceased husband Göran, who died in 2010, and says "May the führer take care of him. And if the Führer's not there, then may God take care of him."

In Rasekrigerne, she revealed her annual attendance to secret meetings in Berlin with other veterans of Nazism.

In February 2024, she was the subject of a rare interview with Dagens Nyheter, a liberal daily, in which she discussed her and her brother's internally incongruous views, expressing strident support for the Nazi movement of her youth, and evoking the oath she personally took to Adolf Hitler in the early 1940s. Summing up her relationship to her brother Folke, she said: "[He] is a Marxist and Jews-friendly, which I am not." She also expressed regret for not alerting the Gestapo to clandestine Jews hidden by the Church of Sweden's local chapter in Berlin during the war, and support for Hamas and the 7 October attack, describing Hamas jihadis as "fantastic warriors".

Preceded by Göran Assar Oredsson	Leader of the Nordic Realm Party; 1975–1978	Succeeded by Göran Assar Oredsson
