= National Socialist Industrial Workers' Union =

Trade union in Sweden

National Socialist Industrial Workers Union (Swedish: Nationalsocialistiska Industriarbetarförbundet, NSIAF) was the trade union wing of the National Socialist Workers Party (NSAP, later renamed the Swedish Socialist Union) in Sweden.

In 1938 NSIAF changed name to Swedish-Socialist Industrial Workers Union (Svensksocialistiska Industriarbetarförbundet, SSIAF). SSIAF was active during the hotel workers strike that year. It credited itself with having 30% higher subsidies to striking workers than the mainstream LO.

In 1941 the organisation changed name to the Trade Union Fighting Organization of Sweden (Sveriges Fackliga Kamporganisation, SFKO).
