= Munckska kåren =

Swedish paramilitary group

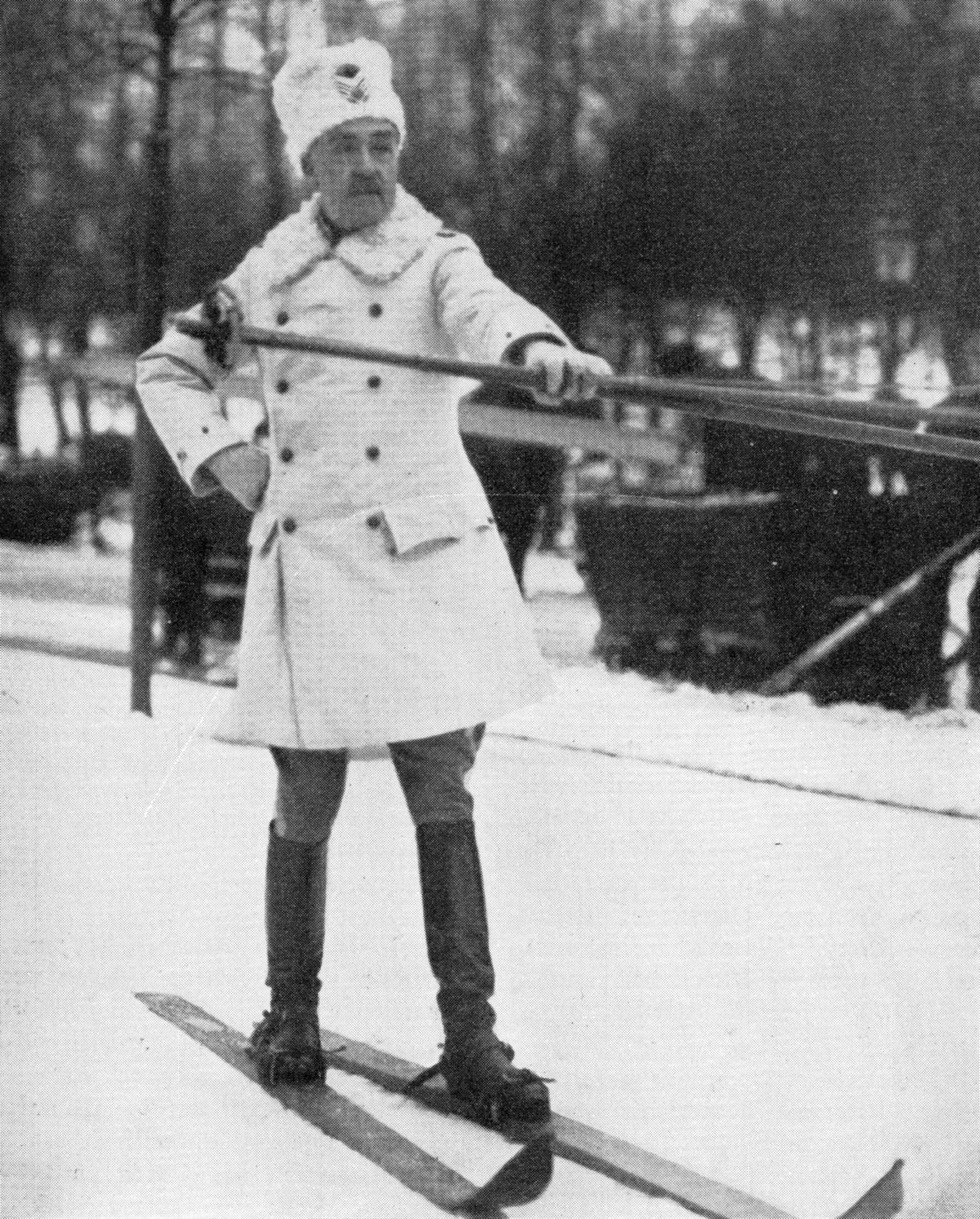
Swedish Lieutenant general Bror Munck (1857-1935) while ski-joring in 1931.

Munckska kåren (literally "the Munck corps", formally Stockholms luftförsvars frivilliga beredskapsförening) was a Swedish secret paramilitary group founded by the retired lieutenant general Bror Munck in 1927. While nominally apolitical, it was founded to protect the Swedish state against "domestic enemies", implying not fascists or Nazis, but solely left-wing radicals. At its height it had about 2,000 members.

In the late 1920s, leaders of the police were affected by the Red Scare and thought they were inadequately prepared for a Bolshevik coup d'état similar to the 1917 Russian Revolution. Anti-communist rhetoric was harsh, especially during the so-called "Cossack Election" of 1928. The plan was for its 2,000 members to have 50 rounds of ammunition each. Stockholm police chief Gustaf Hårleman managed to attain proper licenses for about 1,300 guns, while about 500 to 600 guns were smuggled in illegally from Germany.

The corps was unveiled in 1931, sparking a lively debate in Swedish press. Horst von Pflugk-Harttung, who had facilitated the illegal smuggling of arms, was expelled in December 1931. Many of its members were from the army and the police and also the Fascist People's Party of Sweden. It is believed that Konrad Hallgren, leader of the fascist group, also told authorities about the illegal guns. The corps disbanded the following year. In 1934 Swedish law was altered to ban similar groups.
