= Para-fascism =

Right-wing regimes and movements similar to fascism

Para-fascism (Note: Also known as semi-fascism and quasi-fascism.) is a term proposed by the "new consensus" historians of fascism like Roger Griffin and Stanley G. Payne to distinguish authoritarian conservative regimes rooted in nationalist movements that adopt characteristics associated with fascism such as personality cults, paramilitary organizations, symbols and rhetoric, from what they define as "core fascism" marked by palingenetic ultranationalism, modernism, populism and the goal of a "genuine social revolution". By Griffin, para-fascism often emerges in response to the need for a facade of popular support in an age of mass politics, without a genuine commitment to revolutionary nationalism, instead focusing on maintaining tradition, religion, and culture, and such regimes may co-opt or neutralize genuine fascist movements.

Griffin defines the following regimes and movements as para-fascist: Austrofascism in the Federal State of Austria led by Engelbert Dollfuss and Kurt Schuschnigg, Metaxism in the Greek '4th of August Regime', the "New State" of António de Oliveira Salazar's Portugal, the Bando nacional and the FET y de las JONS led by Francisco Franco in the Spanish State, Kingdom of Hungary led by Miklós Horthy, and the Révolution nationale in Vichy France led by Philippe Petain; the dictatorships of Carol II and Ion Antonescu in the Kingdom of Romania, Miguel Primo de Rivera's dictatorship in Spain and Antanas Smetona's Lithuanian Nationalist Union in Lithuania have also been referred to as para-fascist. While most historians of fascism agree that these regimes were not totally fascist, many authors do acknowledge that they have some kind of connection with fascism, either by being partially influenced by it or by co-opting some genuine fascist groups; those who contest the term note that neither of the existing regimes, Italy and Germany included, were fully fascist, and represented different degrees of fascization achieved by alliances of more conservative elites and radical fascists. The terms used by different historians to characterize these conservative regimes include: "fascisant", "fascistic", "fascistized", and others.

== By country ==
=== Austria ===
The Fatherland Front was an Austrian right-wing conservative, nationalist, and corporatist political organization founded in 1933 by Chancellor Engelbert Dollfuss. It aimed to unite Austrians across political and social divides, emphasizing Austrian nationalism and independence from Germany while protecting the Catholic religious identity. The Front absorbed various anti-Marxist groups, establishing an authoritarian and corporatist regime known as the Ständestaat. It banned and persecuted political opponents, including communists, social democrats, and Austrian Nazis. Dollfuss was assassinated by the Nazis in 1934, and he was succeeded by Kurt Schuschnigg. The Fatherland Front's role in Austrian history remains a subject of debate, with some viewing it as a form of "Austrofascism" responsible for the decline of liberal democracy, while others credit it for defending independence and opposing Nazism.

=== France ===
The Révolution nationale (French pronunciation: [ʁevɔlysjɔ̃ nɑsjɔnal]; lit. 'National Revolution') was the official ideological program promoted by Vichy France (French State) which had been established in July 1940 and led by Marshal Philippe Pétain, after whom the ideological underpinning of Vichy France has also been referred to as Pétainism, also referred to as Vichyism (Vichyisme). Pétain's regime was characterized by anti-parliamentarism, personality cultism, xenophobia, state-sponsored antisemitism, promotion of traditional values, rejection of the constitutional separation of powers, and state corporatism, as well as opposition to the theory of class conflict. Despite its name, the ideological policies were reactionary rather than revolutionary as the program opposed almost every change introduced to French society by the French Revolution. Vichy France is often described as traditional right-wing and authoritarian conservative as opposed to fascism; at the same time, the regime featured characteristics of fascism, and the definition of Vichy as fascist has been advocated by some historians.

As soon as it was established, Pétain's government took measures against the "undesirables", namely Jews, métèques (foreigners), Freemasons, and Communists. The persecution of these four groups was inspired by Charles Maurras' concept of the "Anti-France", or "internal foreigners", which he defined as the "four confederate states of Protestants, Jews, Freemasons and foreigners". The regime also persecuted Romani people, homosexuals, and left-wing activists in general. Vichy imitated the racial policies of the Third Reich and also engaged in natalist policies aimed at reviving the "French race" (including a sports policy), although these policies never went as far as Nazi eugenics.

Although Pétainism ended with the dissolution of Vichy France, such terms as Neo-Pétainism have been used to describe modern French far-right movements.

=== Greece ===
Metaxism is an authoritarian nationalist ideology linked to Ioannis Metaxas in Greece. It aimed for the revitalization of the Greek nation and the establishment of a modern, culturally unified Greece. This ideology criticized liberalism, prioritizing the interests of the nation over individual concerns, and sought to mobilize the Greek populace as a disciplined collective in the pursuit of a "new Greece."

Metaxas proclaimed his 4th of August Regime (1936–1941) as the embodiment of a "Third Greek Civilization," aspiring to create a culturally refined Greek nation drawing from ancient Macedonian and Spartan militaristic societies, representing the "First Greek Civilization," as well as the Orthodox Christian values of the Byzantine Empire, seen as the "Second Greek Civilization." The regime maintained that authentic Greeks were both ethnically Greek and adherents of Orthodox Christianity, explicitly excluding Albanians, Slavs, and Turks in Greece from Greek citizenship.

While the Metaxas government and its official doctrines are sometimes labeled as fascist, scholarly consensus characterizes it as a traditional authoritarian-conservative administration akin to the regimes of Francisco Franco in Spain or António de Oliveira Salazar in Portugal. The Metaxist government drew its authority from the conservative establishment, staunchly supporting traditional institutions like the Greek Orthodox Church and the Greek Monarchy. It leaned towards a reactionary stance and lacked the radical theoretical elements associated with ideologies like Italian Fascism and German Nazism. Notably, the regime did not espouse antisemitism, considering it to be "distasteful." While Georgios Kondylis (who had been prime minister in 1935) was openly inspired by Mussolini and praised Hitler, it is "debatable" whether Metaxas attempted to establish a fascist regime. Metaxas deepened economic ties with Germany but rejected any "Nazification" of his regime.

=== Hungary ===
A member of the "Szeged Fascist" Hungarian National Defence Association Gyula Gömbös was appointed prime minister in 1936. Miklós Horthy required him to publicly renounce anti-antisemitism. He renamed the ruling party to National Unity Party and adopted a pro-Italian foreign policy. From 1938, the regime adopted anti-Semitic laws after Nuremberg Laws and was a pioneer of antisemitic laws passing a numerus clausus back in 1920 but remained relatively safe for Jews compared to other Axis members. Walter Laqueur calls him "not a rabid antisemite" who was unwilling to oppose the "popular mood".

Miklós Horthy's regime is described as "moderate conservative", "pro-fascist", "ultra-rightist Christian-nationalist", "right-wing", "fascist-shaped", or "half-fascist". It allowed some open opposition but was barely democratic and sought to keep the fascist movements from power. For instance, the 1939 parliamentary election were probably rigged to weaken the fascist Arrow Cross Party.

=== Lithuania ===
Marxist historians regarded Antanas Smetona's regime as fascist but while his regime and the Lithuanian Nationalist Union (LTS) were noted to have fascist characteristics, Romuald J. Misiuna notes that the LTS was "in essence it was hardly fascist." LTS founded the Iron Wolf as a secret paramilitary organisation. They were seen as more fascist-leaning and were eventually reformed into a sporting organization after the dismissal of its leader Augustinas Voldemaras. Former Iron Wolf members who remained loyal to Voldemaras became rebel group and the Iron Wolves banned in 1934. LTS participated in the 1934 Montreux Fascist conference. In the late 1930s, the regime-loyal LTS became more influenced by catholic corporatism and the dictatorship adopted more fascist-leaning characteristics.

=== Portugal ===
The National Union was the exclusive legal party of Portugal's Estado Novo regime, established in 1930 under the influence of António de Oliveira Salazar.

Unlike most of the one-party states during its time, it operated more as a political extension of the government rather than holding direct authority. Its membership primarily consisted of local elites like landowners, professionals, businessmen, and individuals with Catholic, monarchist, or conservative republican affiliations. Moreover, although Salazar admired Mussolini and was inspired by the Labor Charter of 1927, he strongly opposed both Fascism and Nazism calling the two ideologies "pagan Caesarism" without restraint.

The National Union did not actively engage in militant activities. Under Salazar's leadership, it became the sole legally permitted party, but he emphasized that it should not function as a conventional political party. Instead, it served as a platform for conservatism rather than a revolutionary force.

The party's ideology centered around corporatism, drawing inspiration from Catholic encyclicals and Mussolini's corporate state. Unlike other ruling Fascist parties, it played a more limited role in governance, primarily focused on controlling and managing public opinion rather than mobilizing it.

Scholarly opinions vary on whether the Estado Novo and the National Union should be classified as fascist or not, with Salazar himself highlighting significant differences between fascism and the Catholic corporatism of the Estado Novo. Some scholars lean towards categorizing it as a conservative authoritarian regime, while others argue for its classification as fascist.

=== Romania ===
Royal dictatorship

After the 1937 general election which were likely rigged against the fascist Iron Guard, King Carol II appointed Octavian Goga of the fascist National Christian Party as prime minister to keep the larger Iron Guard at bay. However, the government was unstable because it did not hold a majority in parliament and was soon replaced by an autocratic government. The king suspended the constitution and created the National Renaissance Front which held the antisemitic policies of Goga in place. The party was later renamed to "Party of the Nation" and moved closer to fascism. The regime failed to gain support from the Iron Guard and in 1940, Carol II resigned.

Antonescu's dictatorship

In 1940, the National Legionary State was created under Ion Antonescu and the Iron Guard. In 1941 however, the Iron Guard staged an unsuccessful coup and Antonescu stayed in power until 1944.

There is a historiographic dispute about whether Antonescu's regime was fascist or more generically right-wing authoritarian, itself integrated within a larger debate about the aspects and limits of fascism. Zeev Sternhell and Hagen Schulze describes Antonescu, alongside his European counterparts Pierre-Étienne Flandin, Franco, Horthy, François de La Rocque, Pétain, Józef Piłsudski, Salazar, and Italian King Victor Emmanuel III, as "conservative" in contrast fascist states.

Other sources call him para-fascist. Dennis Deletant notes that the fascist label relies on both Antonescu's adoption of some fascist "trappings" and the "dichotomy of wartime and postwar evaluation" of his regime, that post-1960 interpretations "do more to explain his behaviour than the preceding orthodoxy" and contrasts the lack of "mass political party or ideology" with the type of rule associated with Nazism or Italian fascism. Juliana Geran Pilon describes Romania's "military fascist regime" as a successor to Iron Guardist "mystical nationalism", while mentioning that Antonescu's "national ideology was rather more traditionally militaristic and conservative."

=== Spain ===
==== Primo de Rivera's dictatorship ====
In 1923, Miguel Primo de Rivera staged a coup d'état. Mussolini called him "chief of Spanish Fascism" but noted the difference between the two. Primo de Rivera's regime was opposed to Mussolini's revolutionary and anti-clerical tendencies.

==== Francoist dictatorship ====
The regime of Francisco Franco in Spain has been described either as fascist or as an authoritarian conservative military dictatorship; throughout the ongoing debates, some historians offered middle positions which still underlined the fascist traits of Francoism: Roger Griffin, for example, defined it as para-fascism; Ismael Saz defined it as dictadura fascistizada, a regime which underwent an unfinished period of rapid fascization with its close alignment with the Axis powers, and afterwards, of unfinished de-fascization after World War II due to its failure to join the Axis and the war's outcome; the regime has been described as 'the most fascist of all non-fascist regimes and the least fascist of all the fascist regimes'. While Enrique Moradiellos contends that "it is now increasingly rare to define Francoism as a truly fascist and totalitarian regime", although he writes that the debates on Francoism haven't finished yet, Saz notes that "it has also begun to be recognised that" Francoism underwent a "totalitarian or quasi-totalitarian, fascist or quasi-fascist" phase. The definition of Francoism as a fascist regime is defended by Paul Preston: according to him, while "style and ideology" of Francoism diverged more from Fascism than the ones of the original Francoism, with similarities in these terms Francoism also pursued the "social and economic function" of fascism. While the heterodox nature of the Nationalist forces is given as an argument for rejecting its definition as fascist, such scholars as Preston, Julián Casanova and Ferran Gallego believed that Francoists at war went through radicalization and fascisation and displayed a unity of a singular fascist movement, while the composition of factions within the regime was similar to the one in Italy and Germany. Other authors noted that Francoism formed in war included such key elements of fascist ideology as the goal to purify and rebuild the national community in the process of the civil war in accordance with the image of a "New Man" born in the "bonfire" of war, but in the case of Francoism modelled as the "Crusading knight" "guided by a combative conception of Christianity", and modern ultranationalism.

The Falange Española Tradicionalista y de las Juntas de Ofensiva Nacional Sindicalista, commonly known as FET y de las JONS or simply "FET," was the exclusive legal political party of the Francoist regime in Spain. Established by General Francisco Franco in 1937, it was a fusion of the fascist Falange Española de las JONS (FE de las JONS) with the monarchist neo-absolutist and integralist Catholic Traditionalist Communion associated with the Carlist movement. Despite the amalgamation, FET largely retained the platform of FE de las JONS, preserving 26 out of its original 27 points, as well as a similar internal structure. This party remained in effect until April 1977, after which it was rebranded as the Movimiento Nacional in 1958 which caused it to transform into an Authoritarian Conservative movement.

=== Yugoslavia ===
In 1929, a royal dictatorship had been established in Yugoslavia which had barely any fascist characteristics. Milan Stojadinović attempted to "fascistize" the regime with little success which was described as unconvincing and even "operetta-like" by historians. The Yugoslav Radical Union adopted green shirts and Stojadinović adopted the title "Vodja", however they officially denied any fascist intent. Stojadinović was authoritarian and anticommunist but did not destroy the constitution. He sought align with Italy and the Axis and claimed in 1938 that he would develop a Yugoslav version of fascism before being dismissed the following year.

== Non-European ==
=== China ===
==== Republic of China (1912–1949) ====
The Blue Shirts Society (BSS) was a Chinese ultranationalist faction within the Kuomintang (KMT) that was influenced by German Brownshirts and Italian Blackshirts, it is debatable whether this can be seen as a fascist organization in the pure sense: unlike the Nazism and Italian Fascism, which is imperialist, populist, and partly anti-conservative, the ultranationalism of the BSS was anti-imperialist, elitist, and conservative. Historians Paul Jackson and Cyprian Balmires, have classified the BSS as a ‘fascistic’ ultranationalist group rather than a ‘fascist’ group. As an extension of the Second Sino-Japanese War, KMT served in the Allies in World War II and was openly an anti-fascist, and the BSS aided the political activities of the KMT.

Chiang Kai-shek started the New Life Movement under Confucian ideals. It was a government-led civic campaign in the 1930s Republic of China to promote cultural reform and Neo-Confucian social morality and to ultimately unite China under a centralized ideology following the emergence of ideological challenges to the status quo. Frederic Wakeman suggested that the New Life Movement was "Confucian fascism", but Wakeman is ambivalent about whether the New Life Movement was in fact fascist. Jay Taylor, argue that Chiang's ideology does not espouse the general ideology of fascism despite his growing sympathies with fascist ideas in the 1930s. China later declared war on fascist countries, including Germany, Italy, and Japan, as part of the Declarations of war during World War II and Chiang became the most powerful "anti-fascist" leader in Asia. When it comes to categorizing fascist regimes, KMT and Chiang's regime is often not categorized as fascist.

==== People's Republic of China ====
Some scholars and journalists have argued that the Chinese Communist Party under the leadership of Xi Jinping resemble aspects of fascism, mostly due to its conservative and nationalist social policies, paired with their authoritarian leadership, sophisticated surveillance system and ever-increasing military strength. Some scholars have argued that the similarities between the Chinese Communist Party in the 21st century and classical fascist regimes lie in their proximity to state capitalism (rather than orthodox communism), as well as their anti-democratic, anti-labor, and chauvinistic expansionism. However, others have criticized the fascism label as "ahistorical" due to the absence of mass mobilization, along with its Marxist-Leninist ideological roots. In general, rather than fascist, the Chinese Communist Party is often described as authoritarian capitalist, authoritarian conservative, conservative nationalist, and conservative socialist.

=== Israel ===
In 1923, Betar, a paramilitary organization rooted in the Revisionist Zionist youth movement led by Ze'ev Jabotinsky, was founded; described by the prominent Israeli historian Tom Segev as operating "in a nationalistic, para-Fascist tone, in the spirit of the times", it modeled itself on European fascist organizations such as the Blackshirts and Brownshirts. Betar was affiliated with the original national-conservative Herut and Likud political parties of Jewish pioneers and was closely connected to the Zionist militant group Irgun.

From 1999 to 2019, Yisrael Beiteinu was a right-wing conservative party that followed Zev Jabotinsky's radical revisionist Zionism, during which the party was sometimes referred to as "quasi-fascist"; now the party is more moderate, breaking with Likud.

=== Japan ===
After the Russian revolution in 1917, several rival proto-fascist and fascist movements developed in Japan, and these activities helped increase the military's influence on the Japanese government. Despite the failure of the February 26 incident, Japan's ultranationalist military forces became the driving force of the fascist movement, gradually playing a central role in national politics.

Empire of Japan, along with Nazi Germany and Fascist Italy, was one of the three major countries of the Axis powers. In the Second Sino-Japanese War and World War II, Japan committed war crimes on a large scale, including rape, slaughter, slavery, and biopsy, on par with Nazi war crimes, including the Holocaust, (Note: While systematic Nazi atrocities resulted in approximately 11 to 17 million deaths, the cumulative death toll caused by the Japanese Empire's expansionism across Asia is estimated to be significantly higher, with some figures ranging from 20 million to over 30 million. This encompasses not only direct massacres but also tens of millions of deaths from man-made famines and forced labor in occupied territories including Korea, China, and Southeast Asia. Consequently, despite the academic controversy, South Korean, Chinese, and some scholars regard the Japanese Empire as a 'fascist' regime whose scale of human destruction exceeds that of Nazi Germany, and Japanese war crimes are often referred to as the [Asian] 'Holocaust'.) Japan is often referred to as "fascist" during this period. However, the system of the Empire of Japan is more para-fascist regimes like Dolfuss' Christian Social Austria, Salazar's Estado Novo in Portugal, and Vichy France, not genuine fascism like Germany and Italy; while common fascists were ethno-nationalists, Japan's ultranationalists put forward the state-nationalist ideology of Kokkashugi.

From 1940 to 1945, Japan established a one-party system by the para-fascist Imperial Rule Assistance Association to efficiently carry out the Second Sino-Japanese War and the Pacific War; the Encyclopedia Britannica defined the military dictatorship led by Hideki Tojo (1941–1944) as fascist regime.

=== Latin America ===
During the 1930s and 1940s, most dictators in Latin America adopted corporatism or other fascist characteristics including Juan Perón in Argentina, Getúlio Vargas in Brazil, Carlos Ibáñez del Campo in Chile, Rafael Trujillo in the Dominican Republic, José María Velasco Ibarra in Ecuador, Maximiliano Hernández Martínez in El Salvador, Jorge Ubico in Guatemala, Rafael Franco in Paraguay and Arnulfo Arias in Panama. Progressive and left-wing movements and regimes like the regime of Lázaro Cárdenas in Mexico, the American Popular Revolutionary Alliance or the Revolutionary Nationalist Movement also adopted such policies. Ubico supported Franco but was not pro-Germany and did not adopt a pro-fascist foreign policy.

The Estado Novo in Brazil ruled by Vargas and Perón's Argentina are classified by Griffin as the best candidates of fascist regimes but both fell short of it. The Estado Novo shared the para-fascist aspects its Portuguese counterpart. Peronism came closer to fascism but it was not radical enough to qualify as fascist according to Griffin. The Brazilian Integralist Action are seen by him as an "authentic" fascist movement but they were less successful than other fascist opposition movements like Romanian Iron Guard and were easily cracked down by Vargas' regime.

There is a debate if Peronism classifies as fascist despite being inspired by fascism. Some like Federico Finchelstein or Donald C. Hodges put into contrast as they lead to democratic reforms and Perón distanced himself from Italian fascism. Some including Seymour Martin Lipset, Eugen Weber and Paul H. Lewis classify Juan Perón as a fascist. Others classify it as "left-wing fascism" or a "national populism".

== Para-Nazism ==
In political science and historiography, "para-Nazism" encompasses both 'para-fascist' authoritarian entities that adopted Nazi administrative or policy mechanisms, as well as 'genuine fascist' movements that modeled themselves after Nazism while asserting distinct non-German national identities. Before 1945, there were political movements that imitated Germany's Nazism, which similar to aid, featured totalitarian, antisemitic, and Völkisch nationalist elements, but rejected certain elements, such as German nationalism or genuine populism: the National Socialist Workers' Party in Poland and Pērkonkrusts in Latvia are prime examples; in the late 1930s, during the Imperial Empire of Japan's wartime period, a series of policies modeled on Nazism were adopted by establishment insiders within the established leadership.

== See also ==
- Clerical fascism
- Crypto-fascism
- Far-right politics
- National conservatism
- Neo-fascism
- Post-fascism
- Proto-fascism
- Rome Protocols
- Ultraconservatism
