= Svenska Sjöfartssektionen =

Trade union in Sweden

Svenska Sjöfartssektionen ('Swedish Maritime Section') was a front organization of the Swedish National Socialist Party, organizing sailors in the Swedish Navy and on commercial ships. Svenska Sjöfartssektionen was founded in 1934, and published the magazine Vikingen ('The Viking'). In Vikingen dedicated significant attention to denouncing the activities of communist sailors' cells.
