= National Socialist Bloc =

Nazi political party in Sweden

NSB poster from 1935, announcing a meeting with Eric von Rosen as main speaker.

Flag of National Socialist Bloc.

National Socialist Bloc (Swedish: Nationalsocialistiska Blocket) was a Swedish Nazi political party formed in the end of 1933 by the merger of Nationalsocialistiska Samlingspartiet, Nationalsocialistiska Förbundet and local National Socialist units connected to the advocate Sven Hallström in Umeå. Later Svensk Nationalsocialistisk Samling merged into NSB.

The leader of the party was Colonel Martin Ekström. The party maintained several publications, Landet Fritt (Gothenburg), Vår Kamp (Gothenburg), Vår Front (Umeå), Nasisten (Malmö) and Riksposten.

NSB differentiated itself from other Swedish Nazi groups due to its liaisons with the Swedish upper class. NSB was clearly smaller than the two main Nazi parties in Sweden at the time, SNSP and NSAP. Gradually the party vanished.
