= The Nordic Realm Party =

Nordic Realm Party Nordiska rikspartiet
- Leader: Göran Assar Oredsson (1956–75; 1978–2009); Vera Oredsson (1975–78)
- Founded: 1956
- Dissolved: 2009
- Preceded by: National Socialist Workers' Party
- Ideology: Neo-Nazism
- Political position: Far-right

Party flag

The Nordic Realm Party (Swedish: Nordiska rikspartiet [ˈnǔːɖɪska ˈrɪ̂kspaˌʈiːɛt]; NRP) was a Neo-Nazi political party in Sweden, founded in 1956 as the National Socialist Combat League of Sweden (Sveriges nationalsocialistiska kampförbund) by Göran Assar Oredsson. Oredsson was also the party leader except for a few years during the 1970s while he wrote his autobiography Prisat vare allt som gjort mig hårdare ("Blessed be everything that has made me a harder man"). During that time, his wife Vera Oredsson took on the role as party leader and became Sweden's first female party leader.

The party had a group modelled after the German Sturmabteilung, called the Realm Action Group (Swedish: Riksaktionsgruppen, RAG). whose members committed several political crimes. NRP published a few magazines, two being the "Nordic Struggle" and "The Sunwheel".

In 1973, NRP ran for the Swedish parliament but only obtained a few hundred votes. In 2009, the party dissolved.

== See also ==
- The Woman with the Handbag
