= New Swedish People's League =

New Swedish People's League Nysvenska folkförbundet
- Leader: Stig Bille
- Founded: 19 January 1930
- Dissolved: 1 October 1930
- Split from: National Socialist People's Party of Sweden
- Merged into: Swedish National Socialist Party
- Headquarters: Gothenburg
- Newspaper: Vår Kamp
- Paramilitary Wing: SA
- Ideology: Nazism

The New Swedish People's League (Swedish: Nysvenska folkförbundet) was a Nazi organization in Sweden. The organization was founded on 19 January 1930, as members of the National Socialist People's Party of Sweden in western Sweden rebelled against the party leader Konrad Hallgren. Stig Bille was the leader of the New Swedish People's League. On 15 March 1930 the organization began publish Vår Kamp ('Our Struggle') as its organ. On 1 October 1930 the organization merged into the New Swedish National League.

In Uppsala, Per Engdahl was a prominent member of the organization.
