= Konrad Hallgren =

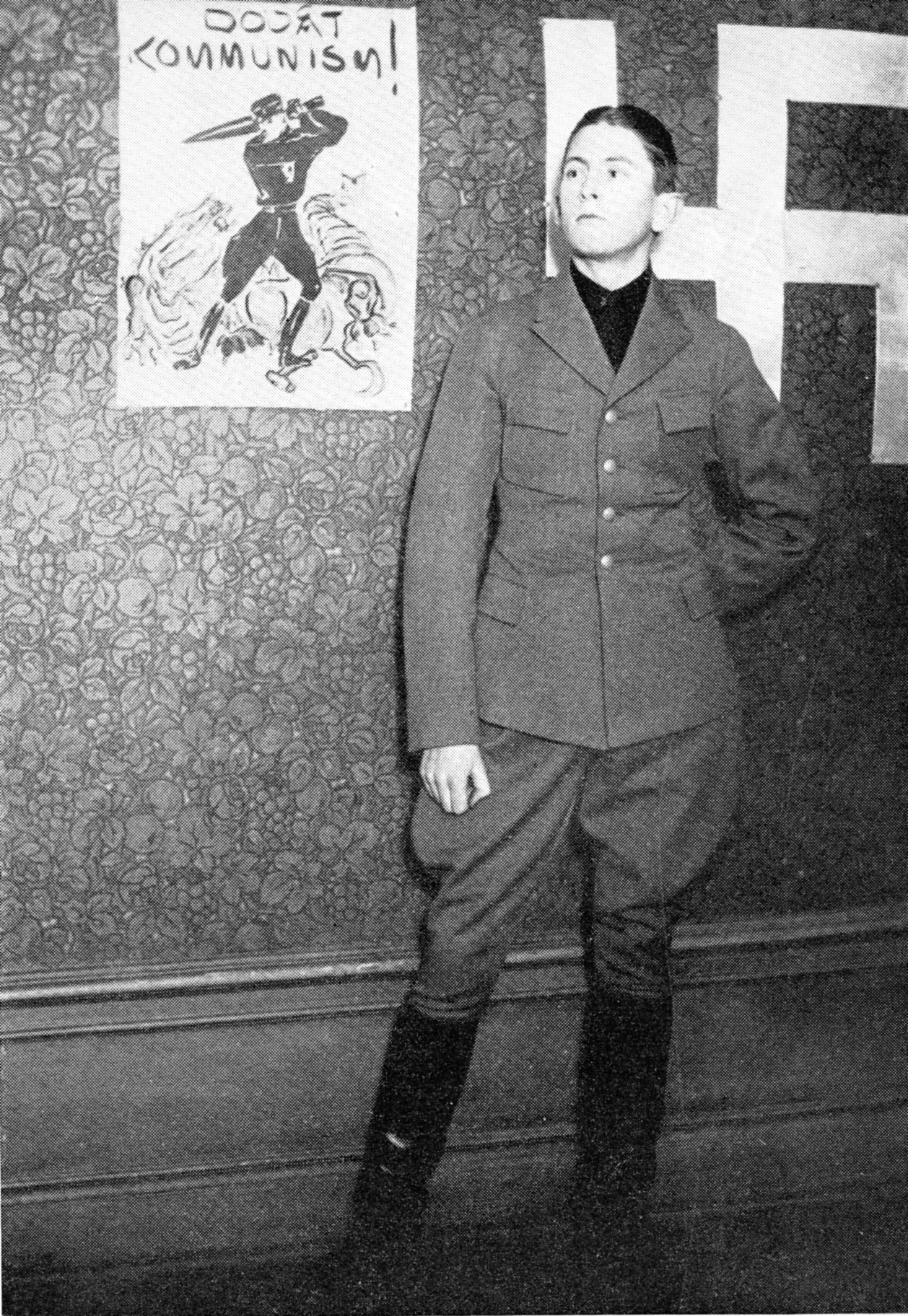
Konrad Hallgren in the 1920s. The propaganda poster on the wall reads "death to communism" in Swedish.

Konrad Otto Kristian Hallgren (9 April 1891 – 8 August 1962) was a Swedish party chairman in Sweden's first fascist organization, Sveriges Fascistiska Kamporganisation (SFKO, "Sweden's Fascist Combat-Organization").

Hallgren was born in Landskrona. He served in the German army during World War I. He claimed to have been in the White Russian army of General Pyotr Wrangel during the Russian Civil War, but his war record has been contested.

At first the SFKO was a fascist organization but more and more turned ideologically to Nazism and changed its name into Fascist People's Party of Sweden and then Sveriges Nationalsocialistiska Folkparti (SNFP, "Sweden's National Socialist People's Party"). Other members of SFKO/SNFP was the Swedish army officer Sven Hedengren and the infamous Swedish national socialist-leader and army corporal Sven-Olov Lindholm (who would later lead his own national socialist party which would become the biggest of the national socialist groups in Sweden during the 1930s–1940s).

Hallgren told in 1931 about the Munckska kåren's existence for the police and also about the weapons that the organization had gathered. Munckska kåren was a group of anti-communist right wing extremists who feared a "bolshevist takeover" in Sweden and which had members from, among others, SFKO, and some officers from the Swedish army, and had secretly been stashing weapons illegally. He later became an archivist working in Stockholm.

Hallgren died in Stockholm.
