= National Socialist Workers' Party (Poland) =

National Socialist Workers' Party Narodowo Socjalistyczna Partia Robotnicza
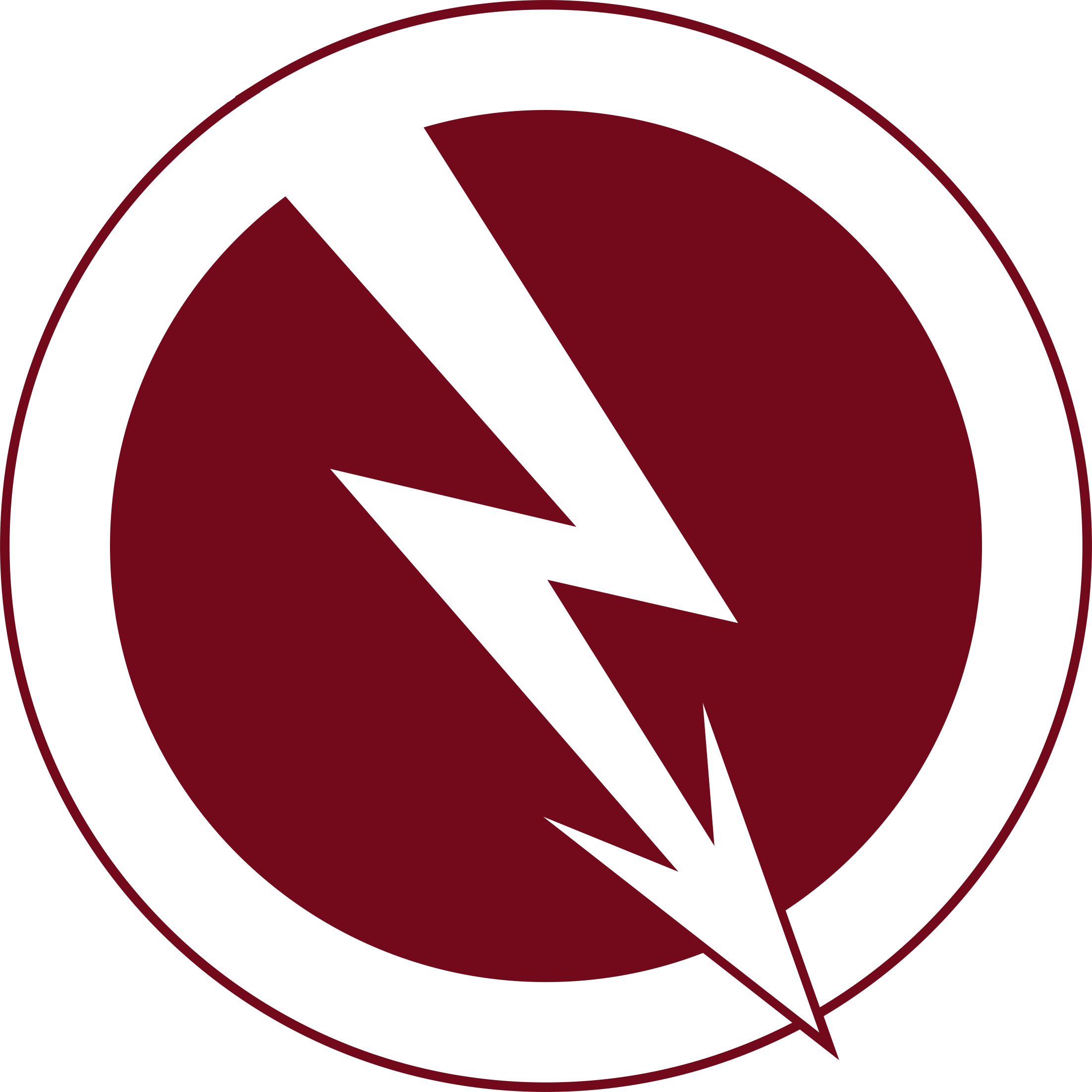
- Abbreviation: NSPR
- Leader: Wacław Kozielski; Józef Grałła
- Founded: 1933
- Dissolved: June 13 1934
- Ideology: Para-Nazism (Note: NSPR imitated German Nazism but advocated Polish nationalism with anti-German sentiment.); Anti-German sentiment Antisemitism; Anti-Marxism
- Political position: Far-right
- Religion: Catholic

National Socialist Workers' Party (Polish: Narodowo-Socjalistyczna Partia Robotnicza, NSPR) was a short-lived Nazi political organization in the Second Polish Republic, active in the early 1930s. It was founded in late 1933 by Wacław Kozielski, a former member of the National Democracy (Stronnictwo Narodowe) in the Kielce region, who was expelled due to his radical views. Kozielski succeeded in recruiting several activists from the Camp of Great Poland (Oboz Wielkiej Polski, OWP) to join the NSPR.

== History ==
NSPR was formed in 1933 as a radical nationalist and anti-Marxist party. Membership was restricted to Christians of “Aryan” descent, and the party promoted anti-Semitic views. It defended Christianity against anti-clericalism, though it showed little interest in strict integrist Catholicism and instead respected all Christian denominations.

In September 1933, the party split into two factions. Kozielski’s faction, based in Sosnowiec, published the periodical "Jedna Karta" and represented the socially radical wing of the movement. The opposing faction, led by Józef Grałła and based in Katowice, published "Błyskawica".

The NSPR was officially dissolved on 13 June 1934. Initially, it attempted to join the National Radical Camp. Following the dissolution, Kozielski’s supporters established the "National Socialist Party of Cities and Villages", which lasted until 1939. Grałła’s followers created several short-lived parties, including the National Social Party, the Polish Fascist Party, and the National Social Party. Another group of former members formed the National Peasant-Worker Front.

== Ideology ==
The NSPR largely imitated other Nazi movements, though it maintained a distinct anti-German stance. Kozielski’s faction represented the socially radical wing of the party. Membership was limited to Christians of “Aryan” descent, and the party combined anti-Marxist and anti-Semitic views with the defense of Christian values and nationalist principles.
