= Swedish National Socialist Party =

Swedish National Socialist Party Svenska nationalsocialistiska partiet
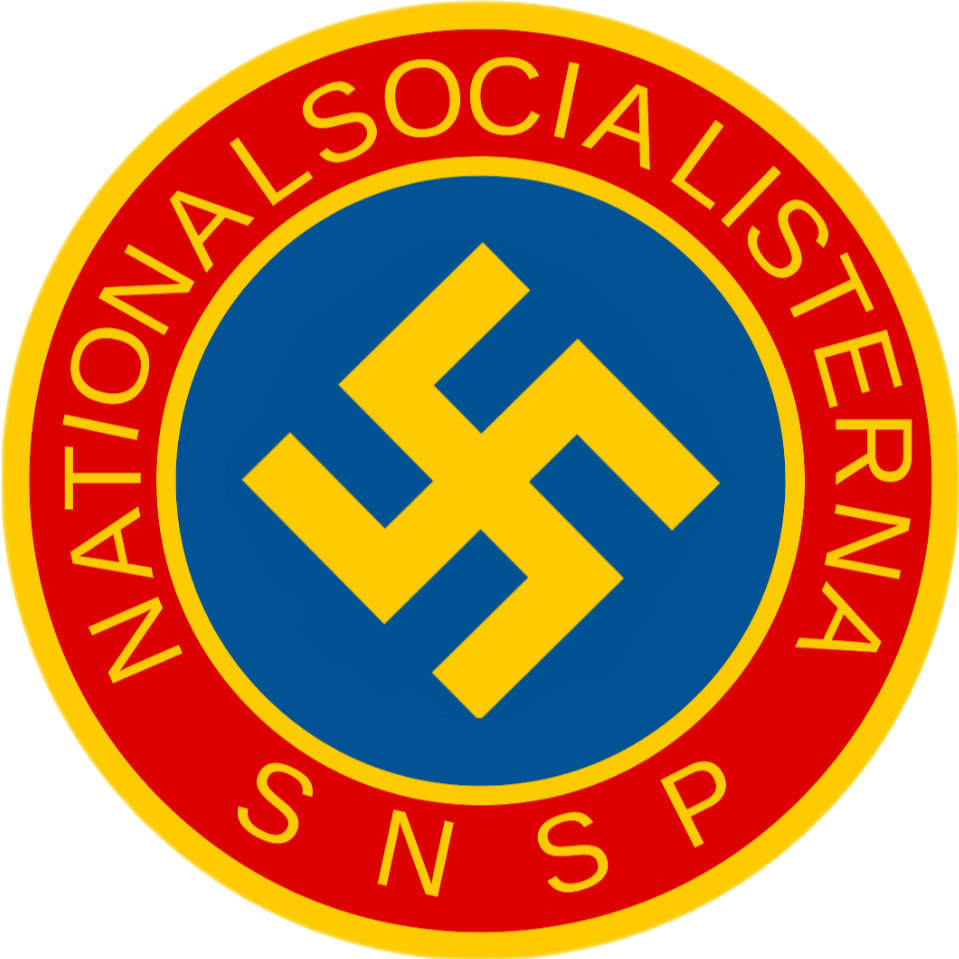
- Abbreviation: SNSP
- National Leader: Birger Furugård
- Founded: 1 October 1930
- Dissolved: 1936
- Merger of: National Socialist People's Party of Sweden; New Swedish People's League
- Succeeded by: National Socialist Workers' Party
- Headquarters: Gothenburg (1930-1933); Karlstad (1933-1936)
- Newspaper: Vår Kamp (1930-1933); Nationalsocialistisk tidning (1933-1936)
- Youth wing: National Socialist Youth League; Vikingarna
- Women's wing: Kristina Gyllenstierna
- Paramilitary Wing: SA
- Membership (1932): ~3,000
- Ideology: Nazism
- Political position: Far-right

Party flag

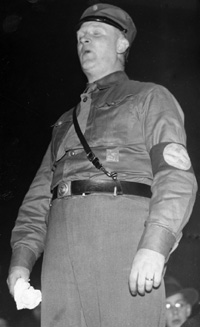
Birger Furugård, SNSP leader

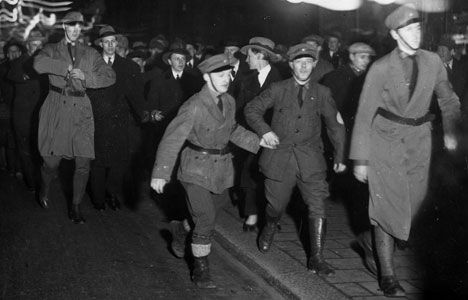
SNSP members at a party rally in Stockholm, 1932

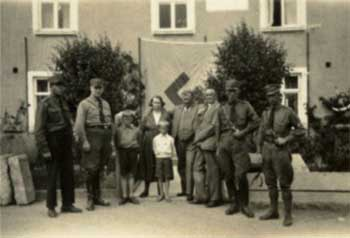
Furugård visiting the SNSP branch in Sjöbo, 1933

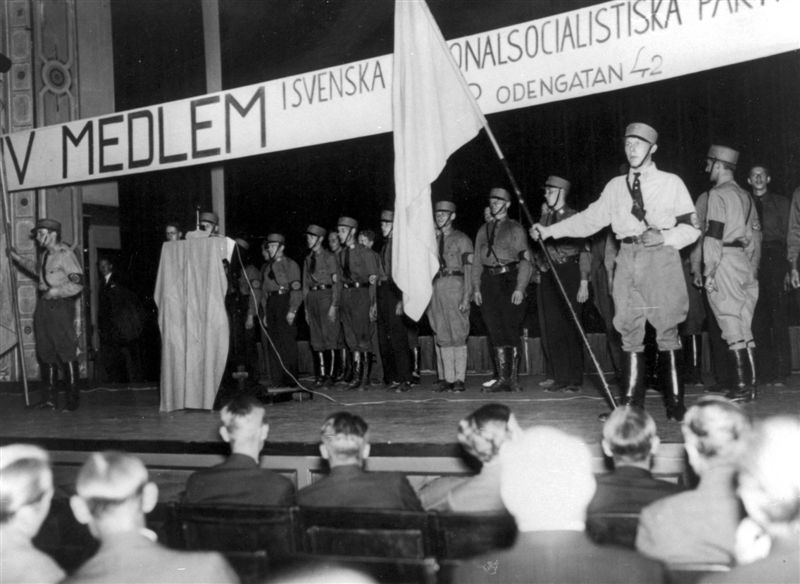
SNSP meeting, 1933

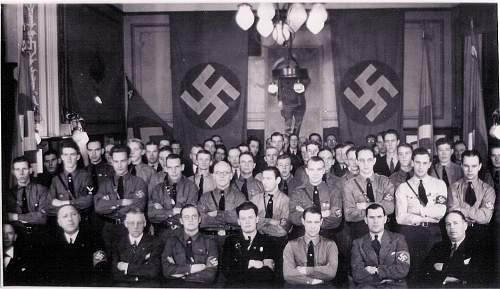
Party meeting, 1935

The Swedish National Socialist Party (Swedish: Svenska nationalsocialistiska partiet, abbreviated SNSP) was a Nazi political party in Sweden. Birger Furugård served as riksledare ('National Leader') of the party.

== Organization ==
The party was modeled after the National Socialist German Workers Party (NSDAP). As National Leader, Furugård had full authority of all party affairs (mimicking the role of the Führer in the German party). Sven Olov Lindholm was the second-in-command in the party and the editor of Vår Kamp. Furugård's two older brothers, Sigurd and Gunnar, also occupied key posts in the party leadership. There was a nine-member Party Staff, which had an advisory function towards the National Leader. Each of the nine had a specific task in the party hierarchy;

- National Organization Chief
- National Secretary (G. Dahlberg)
- National Propaganda Chief
- National Economy Chief
- National Custodian
- National SA Leader (Sven Hedengren)
- Research and Arbitration Leader
- Intelligence Systems Leader

== Links to Germany ==
The party maintained close contacts with their German counterparts. Furugård himself visited Germany on several occasions, and spoke at NSDAP election campaign meetings. He developed personal friendship links to key persons in the German party hierarchy, including Adolf Hitler. The party used a swastika as its symbol.

== History ==
=== Early period ===
The party was founded on October 1, 1930, through the merger of the National Socialist People's Party of Sweden and the New Swedish People's League. The New Swedish National League (Nysvenska nationella förbundet) was the name of the unified party. On November 1, 1930, a new party programme was adopted. The name SNSP was adopted in 1931.

Furugård sought to organize meetings with Adolf Hitler and Joseph Goebbels as invited speakers in March 1931. The plans were however foiled as the Stockholm police chief Eric Hallgren refused to issue a permit for the meetings, fearing riots.

=== 1931 party congress ===
SNSP held its first party congress in Gothenburg April 4–6, 1931 (during the Easter holidays). Around a hundred persons participated in the deliberations, including a representative of NSDAP. The political issues to be discussed were prepared by the 'Great Council', consisting of the national party leadership and leaders of party districts and branches. Issues on party publications, SA and propaganda were discussed during the congress. The party had wanted to organize an armed SA march through the city, but the local authorities refuse to give their permission for such an activity. Instead a propaganda meeting was held indoors in connection with the party congress, with Lindholm as the key speaker.

=== 1932 election ===
The party gathered 15,188 votes in the 1932 parliamentary election, but won no seats in the parliament. The party had fielded candidates in eleven constituencies. Key constituencies for the party were Värmland, Göteborg and Göteborgs och Bohus län. In the backdrop of the elections, internal dissent over Furugård's lifestyle and management of party finances simmered.

=== First split ===
In 1933, SNSP underwent a major split. A conflict between Furugård and Lindholm had simmered since 1932. The conflict emerged from a dispute between Lindholm (who had a somewhat more leftist approach) and the Göteborg party branch (in the hands of the more conservative elements). Furugård remained close to the Göteborg branch, and to some extent he became economically dependent on them. Gradually, tension grew between Furugård and Lindholm. On January 13, 1933, Furugård expelled Lindholm and his followers from the party, after a chaotic meeting of the Great Council. In response, Lindholm set up a party of his own, the National Socialist Workers Party (NSAP) on January 14, 1933. Moreover, Lindholm sent out a declaration to the party branches accusing Furugård of corruption. The SA leader, Hedengren, sided with Lindholm. Many younger party members would also join Lindholm's party. Following the split, SNSP was commonly nicknamed Furugårdspartiet ('The Furugård Party') or Furugårdarna to distinguish the party from Lindholmarna.

In the midst of the split, confusion arose amongst many local branches, which were unsure to which party they would remain affiliated. Some decided to remain independent from both of the two key contenders. The situation was particularly chaotic in Skåne where a number of party branches regrouped as a group of their own, the Swedish National Socialist Unity.

Following the split, SNSP and NSAP competed with each other to gain the support and recognition from both the Swedish electorate as well as their German counterparts. Eventually NSAP would consolidate its position as the largest National Socialist movement in Sweden. In September 1933, Furugård visited Germany, in a move to ensure continued German support for his party. During this trip, he held his last meeting with Hitler. However, Furugård's request for a 20,000 Reichsmark donation to SNSP was rejected by the Germans.

=== Second split ===
In October 1933, SNSP suffered yet another split as Furugård and the Party Staff confronted each other. Both declared each other expelled from the party. Furugård led an expedition of party cadres from Karlstad to Göteborg, to seize properties from the party headquarters. He then returned to Karlstad to establish his new headquarters there. The Party Staff regrouped as the Swedish National Socialist Unity Party. The Swedish National Socialist Unity Party would continue to publish Vår Kamp as their party organ.

=== Municipal elections ===
The party obtained some 11,400 votes for SNSP lists in the 1934/1935 municipal elections, and another 5,400 votes for joint lists with other National Socialist factions (primarily the National Socialist Bloc). Around eighty SNSP council members were elected across the country.

=== Disbanding ===
SNSP held a national meeting in Stockholm in May 1936.

SNSP contested the 1936 parliamentary election in alliance with the National Socialist Bloc. In total the SNSP-NSB alliance fielded candidates in twelve constituencies. The election was a backlash for the party, which was dwarfed by the Lindholm party. The SNSP-NSB alliance gathered merely some 3,025 votes. SNSP was dissolved shortly afterwards. Furugård appealed to his followers to join forces with Lindholm. Furugård effectively retired from political life. He died in 1961.

== Membership ==
By 1932, the party had an estimated 3,000 members organized in around fifty party branches across the country. The party had a predominately a male membership. Around a quarter of the party members were farmers or agricultural workers, and the agrarian profile of the party was particularly notable in southern Sweden.

== Electoral results ==
=== Riksdag ===
Election year	# of overall votes	% of overall vote	# of overall seats won	+/-	Notes
1932	15,170	0.6 (#8)	0 / 349	▲	
1936	3,025	0.1 (#9)	0 / 349	▼	

== Party press ==
Vår Kamp was the main organ of the party, until the October 1933 split. After the split, Furugård was approached by Malte Welin (a character with bad reputation in National Socialist circles in the country at the time). Welin's Svenska Rikstidningen Dagbladet became the de facto organ of the party was the split and Welin assumed an informal post as head of cultural affairs of the party. However, Furugård soon broke his links with Welin. Instead, as of early 1934 Nationalsocialistisk Tidning became the organ of the party with Thure Detter as its editor. The first issue of Nationalsocialistisk tidning had been published on April 28, 1933. Another important organ for the party after the split was Klingan ('The Edge'), published from Linköping by Rolf A. L. Nystedt, with a handful of issues per year 1934–1935. The editorial offices of Nationalsocialistisk Tidning were moved to Linköping.

In 1932, a single issue of Hakkorset ('The Swastika') was published in Göteborg.

In 1933, a daily newspaper for the Southern District of SNSP was launched, Skånska nationalsocialisten ('Scanian National Socialist'). However, only a single issue of the newspaper was ever published. Likewise a single issue of a new organ for the Western District was published from Göteborg, Västsvenska nationalsocialisten ('West Swedish National Socialist'). William Andersson was the editor of Västsvenska nationalsocialisten. There was also a failed attempt to launch a weekly party organ from Strömstad, Norrvikens-Kuriren.

== Linked organizations ==
The party had a youth wing, the National Socialist Youth League (Nationalsocialistiska ungdomsförbundet, abbreviated 'NSU'). In February 1935 a new youth wing was launched, Vikingarna ('The Vikings'). John Åstrand was the leader of Vikingarna. The membership of Vikingarna was primarily based amongst secondary school students. According to contemporary police estimates, the membership of Vikingarna would have been between 1,000 and 5,000 as of 1935.

The women's organization of the party was called Kristina Gyllenstierna (named after a historical character with the same name).

In 1934 SNSP launched an organization for sailors, Svenska Sjöfartssektionen, seeking to counter the influence of communist sailors' cells.
