= Birger Furugård =

Swedish far-right politician (1887–1961)

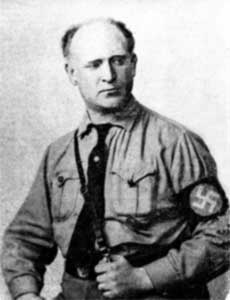

Riksledare of the New Swedish National Socialist Party
- In office 1930–1936

Personal details
- Born: 8 December 1887
- Died: 4 December 1961 (aged 73)

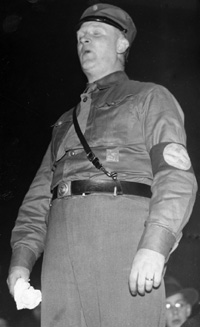
Furugård in 1932

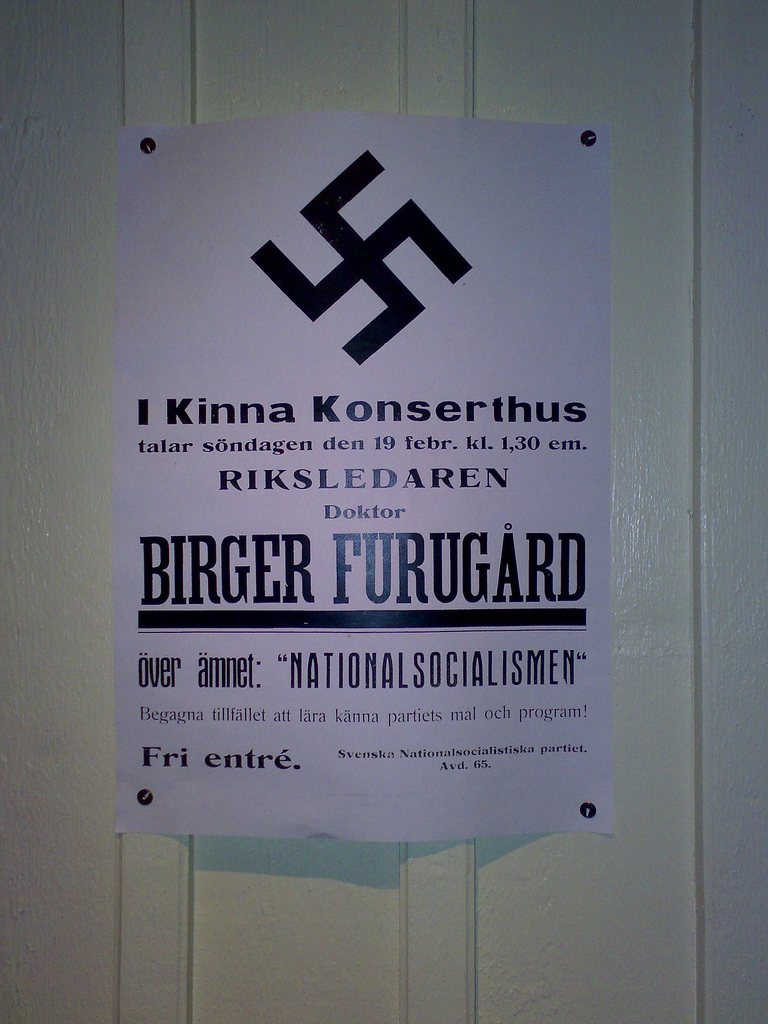
Poster of the Swedish National Socialist Party, announcing a speech by Furugård

Birger Furugård (8 December 1887 – 4 December 1961) was a Swedish politician and veterinarian. He hailed from Deje in Värmland. During the 1920s Furugård became inspired by the advance of Nazism in Germany. He made several trips to Germany, and met with Adolf Hitler, Hermann Göring and Heinrich Himmler. In 1924 Furugård, together with his two brothers Gunnar and Sigurd, founded the Swedish National Socialist Freedom League. The following year the group was converted into the Swedish National Socialist Peasants and Workers Party. In 1930 Furugård's party merged with the National Socialist People's Party of Sweden and formed the New Swedish National Socialist Party. Furugård became Riksledare (National Leader) of the party. Soon, the party changed its name to Swedish National Socialist Party (SNSP).

In March 1931 Hitler and Joseph Goebbels were invited to speak at public meetings in Sweden, but the police chief in Stockholm refused to give permission.

Until 1933 Furugård was the main leader of the Swedish extreme right, and he was portrayed by his followers as future Führer of Sweden (Swedish: riksledare) in the event of a Nazi seizure of power. In 1933 the second-in-command Sven Olov Lindholm formed the National Socialist Workers Party (NSAP), rapidly superseding Furugård as the most prominent Nazi leader in Sweden. In the Swedish press and the public he was often called "Deje-Hitler". Furugård was later sentenced to two months in prison for defaming Criminal Police Superintendent Alvar Zetterquist.

Furugård disbanded his party in 1936, following a meagre performance at the national election earlier that year.

After the war, Furugård continued his work as a veterinarian. When Dagens Nyheter interviewed him in 1951, the "ex-Führer in Molkom" was described as a broken man. The newspaper noted that Furugård admitted that there had been atrocities in Hitler's Germany, but refused to accept the existence of the gas chambers.
