= National Socialist Workers' Party (Sweden) =

National Socialist Workers' Party Swedish Socialist Union Nationalsocialistiska Arbetarepartiet Svensk socialistisk samling
- Abbreviation: NSAP; SSS
- Chairman: Sven Olov Lindholm
- Founded: 15 January 1933
- Dissolved: June 1950
- Preceded by: Swedish National Socialist Party
- Succeeded by: Nordic Realm Party
- Newspaper: Den Svenske Nationalsocialisten
- Youth wing: Nordisk ungdom
- Labour wing: National Socialist Industrial Workers' Union
- Ideology: Nazism (1933–1938) • Swedish nationalism • Lindholmism • Para-Nazism (After 1938)
- Political position: Far-right

Party flag

The National Socialist Workers' Party (NSAP; Swedish: Nationalsocialistiska Arbetarepartiet) was a Swedish political party that initially espoused Nazism before adopting a more indigenous form of fascism. It was also widely infamous under the name Svensk socialistisk samling (SSS, 'Swedish Socialist Gathering'), which was generally among the public called Lindholmarna (lit. 'the Lindholm-ers', after their leader Sven Olov Lindholm).

The party was revealed after WWII to have had well-organized plans, containing death lists of local Jews to be rounded up and deported and also plans for the construction of two Swedish concentration camps, in case of a Nazi German invasion of Sweden. Lindholm himself had planned to take the role as a "Swedish Quisling" if such an invasion had happened.

The Swedish king Gustav V had friendly ties to the SSS/NSAP during the war.

== History ==
The party was formed in 1933 by Sven Olov Lindholm after he left the Swedish National Socialist Party (SNSP), following a series of clashes over policy and personality. The NSAP initially acted as a simple mirror of the National Socialist German Workers Party, with the party newspaper Den Svenske Nationalsocialisten repeating what was being said in Nazi Germany and the Nordisk ungdom (Nordic Youth) group serving as a replica of the Hitler Youth (albeit on a smaller scale). The swastika was also initially used as the party emblem.

The party members visited the early German NSDAP Nuremberg rallies, carrying Swedish flags and meeting with the NSDAP leadership. They used to provoke political opponents in Sweden, sabotaging legal speeches and demonstrations held by other parties, and spread Nazi and Fascist flyers and posters and similar activities. In the 1936 general election, it won six times as many votes as the SNSP from which it had split, and the SNSP dissolved shortly afterwards.

Lindholm later claimed his NSAP was moving away from the Hitler model, abandoning its ties to Nazi Germany in favour of a more Swedish Nazi model. This has been questioned by historians as a post-WWII attempt to distort their own Party history. In 1938, it is said to have ceased to use the swastika and replaced it with the fasces symbol. By the end of the year, the party had changed its name to Svensk Socialistisk Samling (Swedish Socialist Gathering) and had largely dropped all but passing reference to the German Nazis. Nonetheless, the party declined dramatically during the Second World War and was formally dissolved in 1950, five years after WWII. Several members of NSAP/SSS joined the Waffen-SS during the war as part of the few hundred Swedish SS volunteers, and also the Winter War in Finland. Those who returned home afterwards rarely mentioned the war in public out of fear of being investigated or accused of war crimes.

In 1943, the party's national congress in Uppsala caused the Easter Riots to break out.

The party was one of the earliest to claim that no Holocaust happened, in May 1945 in Den Svenske Folksocialisten.

== Swedish Holocaust plans ==
It was discovered some years after WWII, when incomplete lists from the SSS/NSAP containing the names of nearly one thousand Jews was found, that the party had hoped for, and planned well for, a Nazi German invasion of Sweden.

Local party branches had helped gather well-documented information about hundreds of local Jews' businesses, names, families, their children's schools, workplaces, etc, and collected these documents to the party's main branch. These lists are today often referred to as death lists by historians and experts, since the movement was known for their fanatic hatred of Jews.

The party would, in case of such an invasion, first have strived to set up a "Swedish Quisling puppet regime" (an idea that has been compared to i.e the Norwegian one under Nasjonal Samling) with Lindholm as leader. It has been revealed their plans involved the construction of at least two Swedish concentration camps (to be located in Sjöbo and Stora Karlsö) for Jews; they had the locations and maps for these ready, and then would have rounded up the thousands of Jews in Sweden along with political opponents and so on, for deportations to the camps and/or to Nazi German death camps.

== Electoral results ==
=== Riksdag ===
Election year	# of overall votes	% of overall vote	# of overall seats won	+/-	Notes
1936	17,483	0.6 (#8)	0 / 349	▲	
1944	4,204	0.1 (#7)	0 / 349	▲	

== Gallery ==
Poster of the SSS in Lidingö (Branch no. 93) and NU - Vanguard Lidingö, announcing a meeting. Gunnar Prawitz speaks on 'Capitalist Democracy or Nordic People's State' and Sgt. Sten Lundberg on 'Nordic Youth, Vanguard of the Future'.
