= Sven Olov Lindholm =

Swedish Nazi leader (1903–1998)

Leader of the Swedish Socialist Union
- In office 1933–1950

Personal details
- Born: Sven Olov Knutsson Lindholm; 8 February 1903 Jönköping, Sweden
- Died: 26 April 1998 (aged 95) Rönninge, Sweden
- Party: SSS
- Other political affiliations: SFKO
- Spouse: Vera Oredsson (1950–1962)
- Parent: Knut Lindholm (father)

Military service
- Allegiance: Kingdom of Sweden
- Branch/service: Swedish Army
- Rank: Colour Sergeant

Sven Olov Knutsson Lindholm (8 February 1903 – 26 April 1998) was a Swedish Nazi leader, active in far-right politics from the 1920s to the 1950s. This included leading the Nazi party named Svensk socialistisk samling (SSS; literally "Swedish Socialist Union"); despite its name, this party was widely regarded as propagating a fascist/Nazi ideology.

In later years, during the 1970s and 1980s, he renounced his former anti-semitism, and stated he believed the Holocaust perpetrated by Nazi Germany had happened and that it was a crime. He quit the Nazi movement, and became a supporter of the political left and the peace movement.

== Biography ==
Born in Jönköping Municipality, Lindholm joined the Swedish army at an early age, rising to the rank of Sergeant. Stationed in Stockholm, he was initially drawn to Elof Eriksson, a proto-fascist who emphasised anti-communism and anti-Semitism. He soon joined Konrad Hallgren in setting up the Sveriges Fascistiska Folkparti (Swedish Fascist People's Party) – which became known as Sveriges Fascistiska Kamporganisation (Swedish Fascist Combat-Organization) – serving as organizer and then leader of the group.

Lindholm visited Nuremberg in 1929 and as a consequence abandoned Italian fascism in favour of Nazism and as a result he played a leading role in both the National Socialist People's Party of Sweden and its successor the Swedish National Socialist Party. The 6% Lindholm captured in Gothenburg in the 1932 election represented a high point for the Swedish Nazis. However, Lindholm grew tired of the leadership of Birger Furugård as he had grown more attracted to Strasserism than Furugård's straight Nazism. As a result, in 1933 he formed the Nationalsocialistiska Arbetarpartiet.

The new group, which adopted the swastika, took, for propaganda reasons, a more anti-capitalist line and organized its own youth group, the Nordisk Ungdom (Nordic Youth). By 1938 Lindholm had become more critical of the government of Germany, and attempted to reorganise the group as a more Swedish version of Nazism, reinventing them as the Svensk Socialistisk Samling (SSS, "Swedish Socialist Union").

Lindholm returned to the army in 1941 as a Fanjunkare in the artillery. He maintained an ambiguous relationship with Germany during war-time, attacking Operation Weserübung, yet also helping to recruit men for Adolf Hitler. During the war, Lindholm and his party was planning for, and in secret hoped for, a German invasion of Sweden that could lead to the creation of a Swedish puppet state under Lindholm and the party as "Swedish Quislings". Secret plans to deport Jews and others, and plans to construct concentration camps inside Sweden, were drawn up by the party. They gathered death lists of hundreds of Jews which were later (likely when Lindholm and the others realized Sweden would remain neutral and that Hitler was losing) hidden and some most likely destroyed. Such lists were discovered in the 1970s but no documents have been found showing Lindholm was ever questioned about these plans and lists.

Svensk Socialistisk Samling continued to be active until 1950, after which Lindholm went into semi-retirement, with only minor involvement in far-right youth groups maintaining his activity.

In the 1970s and 1980s, Lindholm stated in public to Swedish media that he no longer was an antisemite, saying that there were good and bad people in all races and that he didn't support his former ideology.

He and Vera Oredsson, his then-wife, separated because of Lindholm's growing criticism of Nazi ideology. He quit the Nazi movement, and instead became active in the left-wing peace movement and peaceful environmental left-wing politics.

== See also ==
- Roberto Thieme, Chilean nationalist who underwent a similar ideological change
