= Fascist People's Party of Sweden =

National Socialist People's Party of Sweden (Fascist People's Party of Sweden) Sveriges Nationalsocialistiska Folkparti (Sveriges Fascistiska Folkparti)
- Leader: Konrad Hallgren
- Founded: 3 September 1926
- Dissolved: 1 October 1930
- Preceded by: Fascist Struggle Organisation of Sweden
- Merged into: Swedish National Socialist Party
- Newspaper: Nationen
- Paramilitary wing: Stormgruppen Vasa
- Ideology: Swedish nationalism Fascism (until 1929); Nazism; Monarchism
- Political position: Far-right

Fascist People's Party of Sweden (in Swedish: Sveriges Fascistiska Folkparti) was a fascist and later Nazi political party in Sweden.

== History ==
It was founded on 3 September 1926 by a circle around the fascist publication Nationen. Its cadre was made up of members of the earlier Sveriges Fascistiska Kamporganisation ("Sweden's Fascist Combat Organisation", SFKO, initially called "Sveriges Fosterländska Kamporganisation", i.e "Sweden's pro-national combat organisation", in the start).

Ideologically, the party was initially strongly influenced by Italian fascism and Benito Mussolini, but later on, the focus was shifted towards German Nazism. Until 1929 the organisation used the fasces as its symbol however this was later replaced with three crowns representing its support for the Swedish monarchy placed upon a white circle with a red background similar to the flag of the Nazi Party representing its shift in ideology towards Nazism.

The party's rhetoric was firmly anti-communist and anti-semitic. The party newspaper consistently advocated for violence.

Konrad Hallgren, a former German officer, was one of the people who started the organization and also became the leader of the party. He was also involved with the secret right-wing paramilitary "Munckska kåren" ("Munck's corps"). Other important members included Corporal Sven Olov Lindholm and Lieutenant Sven Hedengren. It had close connections to at least one leading member of the German counter-revolutionary Freikorps who, after the Freikorps murder of Rosa Luxemburg, had moved to Sweden.

In 1929 a delegation of the party, including Hallgren and Lindholm, attended the Parteitag of NSDAP in Nuremberg. After the return from Germany, the party changed its name to National Socialist People's Party of Sweden (Sveriges Nationalsocialistiska Folkparti).

On 19 January 1930 the party split, with members under Stig Bille rebelling against Hallgren and forming the New Swedish People's League. In 1930, the party merged with the Swedish National Socialist Peasants and Workers Party. Later the same year, it merged with the New Swedish People's League, forming the Swedish National Socialist Party.
