= List of fascist movements by country N–T =

A list of political parties, organizations, and movements adhering to various forms of fascist ideology, part of the list of fascist movements by country.

== Fascist movements, sorted by country ==
Overview A–F G–M N–T U–Z

Logo	Name of movement	Country of predominant operation	Came to power?	Founded post-World War II?	Active?	General influence	Flag	Notes
	Dutch People's Union	Netherlands	No	Yes (1971)	Yes	Neo-Nazism		
	Wolvenrad	Netherlands	No	Yes (2020)	Yes	Neo-Nazism		
	General Dutch Fascist League	Netherlands	No	No (1932)	No	Nazism		
	National Socialist Movement in the Netherlands	Netherlands	Yes	No (1931)	No	Nazism		Originated in 1931 as a fascist movement, converted to antisemitism and national-socialism in 1936-1937, never gained more than 8% of the Dutch voters
	National Socialist Dutch Workers Party	Netherlands	No	No (1931)	No	Nazism		Broke away from NSB
	Union of Actualists	Netherlands	No	No (1923)	No	Italian Fascism		
	Black Front	Netherlands	No	No (1934)	No	Clerical fascism		
	National Socialist Party of New Zealand	New Zealand	No	Yes (1969)	No	Nazism		
	New Zealand National Front	New Zealand	No	Yes (1968)	Yes	Neo-Nazism		Splinter group of the League of Empire Loyalists, not a fascist organization
	Unit 88	New Zealand	No	Yes	No	Neo-Nazism		
	Nasjonal Samling (NS)	Norway	Yes	No (1933)	No	Nazism		Founded and led by Vidkun Quisling. Formed German puppet government in Norway. Banned 1945.
	National Socialist Movement of Norway	Norway	No	Yes (1988)	Yes	Neo-Nazism		
	Norwegian Front (NF)	Norway	No	Yes (1975)	No	Neo-fascism		
	Norwegian Germanic Army	Norway	No	Yes	No	Neo-Nazism		
	Vigrid	Norway	No	Yes (1999)	Yes	Neo-Nazism		
	Brit HaBirionim	Palestine (British Mandate of Palestine)	No	No (1930)	No	Italian Fascism		Founded by of Dr. Abba Ahimeir, Uri Zvi Greenberg and Dr. Joshua Yeivin.
	Accion Comunal	Panama	Yes	No		Panameñism		Founded by Dr. Arnulfo Arias
	Falange Peru	Peru	No	Yes	?	Falangism		official site
	Revolutionary Union	Peru	Yes	No (1931)	No	Independent		Founded by Peruvian President Luis Miguel Sánchez Cerro
	Ganap Party	Philippines	Yes (as part of KALIBAPI)	No (1941)	No	Far-right nationalism, fascism		Collaboratonist movement deriving from Sakdalista party
	KALIBAPI	Philippines	yes	No (1942)	No	Fascism		Collaborationist movement
	Makapili	Philippines	Yes (as part of KALIBAPI)	No (1941)	No	Far-right nationalism, fascism		Extreme nationalist, collaborationist movement, Anti-American party.
	Philippine Falange	Philippines	No	No (late 1930s)	No	Falangism		Branch of the Spanish Falange. Leadership positions held by influential Spanish businessmen.
	Camp of Great Poland (OWP)	Poland	No	No (1925)	No	Far-right nationalism		Founded and led by Roman Dmowski. Banned 1933
	National Radical Camp (ONR)	Poland	No	No (1934)	No	Far-right nationalism		Splinter group of the National Party (SN), led by Jan Mosdorf. Banned soon after its establishment, in 1934. Splintered into ONR-ABC and RNR-Falanga.
	National Radical Camp-ABC (ONR-ABC)	Poland	No	No (1935)	No	National radicalism, far-right nationalism		Breakaway movement led by Henryk Rossman. During World War II ONR-ABC was transformed into a resistance movement called the "Rampart" Group.
	National Radical Movement-Falanga (RNR-Falanga)	Poland	No	No (1935)	No	National radicalism, far-right nationalism		Breakaway movement led by Bolesław Piasecki. Commonly known as the ONR-Falanga. During World War II RNR-Falanga was transformed into a resistance movement called the Confederation of the Nation (KN).
	Party of National Socialists (PNS)	Poland	No	No (1933)	No	National socialism (non-Nazi, anti-German) pl:Narodowy socjalizm (znaczenie ogólne), Polish nationalism, Pan-Slavism		Splinter group of The National Labour Party (NSP).
	National Radical Camp (ONR)	Poland	No	Yes (1993)	Yes	Far-right nationalism		Nationalist movement based on the tradition of a pre-war group of the same name.
	National Rebirth of Poland (NOP)	Poland	No	Yes (1981)	Yes	Far-right nationalism, third position		Led by Adam Gmurczyk. Party refers to the pre-war Polish national radical movements.
	National Socialist Workers' Party (NSPR)	Poland	No	No (1933)	No	National socialism (non-Nazi, anti-German) pl:Narodowy socjalizm (znaczenie ogólne), Polish nationalism		
	Young German Party in Poland (JDP)	Poland	No	No (1931)	No	Nazism		Party of the German minority. Ceased activity after the German invasion of Poland in 1939.
	German People's Union in Poland	Poland	No	No (1924)	No	Nazism		Party of the German minority. Ceased activity after the German invasion of Poland in 1939.
	German Union for Western Poland (DV)	Poland	No	No (1934)	No	Nazism		Party of the German minority. Ceased activity after the German invasion of Poland in 1939.
	National Action Movement	Portugal	No	Yes (1986)	No	Nazism		Inactive 1992
	National Syndicalists	Portugal	No	No	No	independent		Banned by the Estado Novo
	National Union	Portugal	Yes	No (1932)	?	Estado Novo/Clerical Fascism		
	New Social Order	Portugal	No	Yes (2014)	No	Lusitanian Integralism		
	Ordem Nova ("New Order")	Portugal	No	Yes (1978)	No	Neo-fascism		dissolved in 1982
	Crusade of Romanianism	Romania	No	No (1934)	No	Romanian fascism		Initially called the White Eagles
	Everything For the Country Party	Romania	No	Yes (1993)	No	Romanian fascism		
	Iron Guard	Romania	Yes	No (1927)	No	Romanian fascism		Breakaway group from National-Christian Defense League; members were called "Green Shirts" because of their green uniforms
	National-Christian Defense League	Romania	No	No (1923)	No	Romanian fascism		Iron Guard was a breakaway group from this movement
	National Christian Party	Romania	Yes	No (1935)	No	Romanian clerical fascism		
	National Fascist Movement	Romania	No	No (1923)	No	Italian Fascism/independent		Union of NIRFM and NRF
	National Italo-Romanian Fascist Movement	Romania	No	No (1921)	No	Italian Fascism		Led by Elena Bacaloglu
	National Romanian Fascio	Romania	No	No (1921)	No	Fascism		Led by Titus Vifor
	National Socialist Party	Romania	No	No (1932)	No	Nazism		
	New Right	Romania	No	Yes (2015)	Yes	Neo-fascism		
	Romanian Front	Romania	No	No (1935)	No	Romanian fascism		Splinter group of National Peasants' Party led by Alexandru Vaida-Voevod
	Swastika of Fire	Romania	No	No (1935)	No	Nazism		
	Ethnic National Union	Russia	No	Yes (2018)	Yes	Neo-Nazism		
	Front of National Revolutionary Action	Russia	No	Yes (1991)	No	Neo-Nazism		
	Northern Alliance Party	Russia	No	Yes (1999)	No	Neo-Nazism		Neo-nazis taking inspiration from collaborationist movements from World War II.
	Northern Brotherhood	Russia	No	Yes (2006)	No	Neo-Nazism		
	Pamyat	Russia	No	Yes	No	Monarchist restoration, ultra-nationalism		Splintered into Russian National Union and National Unity of Russia
	National Bolshevik Party	Russia	No	Yes (1993)	No	National Bolshevism		
	The Other Russia of E. V. Limonov	Russia	No	Yes (2010)	Yes	National Bolshevism		
	Russian National Socialist Party (formerly Russian National Union)	Russia	No	Yes (1992)	No	Neo-Nazism		Led by Konstantin Kassimovsky; became Russian National Socialist Party in 1998; splinter of Pamyat in 1992
	Russian National Unity	Russia	No	Yes	Yes	Neo-Nazism		
	Slavic Union	Russia	No	Yes (1999)	Yes	Neo-Nazism; Pan-Slavism		Banned in 2010
	National Socialist Russian Workers' Party	Russia	No	Yes (1994)	No	Neo-Nazism, Anti-turkism		
	Block FACT	Russia	No	Yes (2010)	No	Anti-Communism		
	National Socialist Society	Russia	No	Yes (2004)	Yes	Neo-Nazism		
	Army for the Liberation of Rwanda	Rwanda	No	Yes (1997)	No	Hutu Power		Rebel group active in the eastern regions of the Democratic Republic of the Congo.
	Coalition for the Defence of the Republic	Rwanda	No	Yes (1992)	No	Hutu Power		
	Democratic Forces for the Liberation of Rwanda	Rwanda	No	Yes (2000)	No	Hutu Power		Rebel group active in the eastern regions of the Democratic Republic of the Congo.
	Interahamwe	Rwanda	No	Yes (1990)	Yes	Hutu Power		
	National Revolutionary Movement for Development	Rwanda	Yes	Yes (1975)	No	Hutu Power		
	Sammarinese Fascist Party	San Marino	Yes	No (1922)	No	Italian Fascism		Collapsed in 1943, refounded as Republican Fasces of San Marino in January 1944 and subsequently banned in November
	Serbian Volunteer Corps (World War II)	Yugoslavia (Territory of the Military Commander in Serbia)	No	No	No	Fascism		
	Yugoslav National Movement	Yugoslavia	No	No	No	Fascism		
	Leviathan Movement	Serbia	No	Yes (2015)	No	Neo-fascism		
	Nacionalni stroj	Serbia	No	Yes	Yes	Neo-Nazism		Neo-Nazi skinheads
	Otačastveni pokret Obraz	Serbia	No	Yes	Yes	Clerical fascism		
	Serbian Action	Serbia	No	Yes (2010)	Yes	Ultranationalism Neo-fascism		
	Slovak Togetherness	Slovakia	No	Yes	Yes	Neo-Nazism		Banned in 2006
	Slovak People's Party	Slovakia, Czechoslovakia, Austria-Hungary	Yes	No (1906)	No	Clerical fascism		Formed German puppet government in Slovakia
	People's Party Our Slovakia	Slovakia	No	Yes	Yes	Fascism, Neo-Nazism		
	Afrikaner Studentebond	South Africa	No	Yes	?	Nazism		
	Afrikaner Weerstandsbeweging	South Africa	No	Yes (1973)	Yes	Neo-Nazism		
	Blanke Bevrydingsbeweging	South Africa	No	Yes (1985)	No	Neo-Nazism		
	Boerestaat Party	South Africa	No	Yes	?	Apartheid		Paramilitary group, the Boere Weerstandsbeweging
	Herstigte Nasionale Party	South Africa	No	Yes	Yes	Apartheid, Anti-Volkstaat		
	National Party	South Africa	Yes	No (1914)	No	Apartheid		
	Ossewabrandwag	South Africa	No	No (1939)	No	Apartheid		
	South African Gentile National Socialist Movement	South Africa	No	No (1932)	No	Nazism		Paramilitary group was the Gryshemde, “Grayshirts”
	South African National Front	South Africa	No	Yes (1977)	No	Neo-fascism		
	Autonomous Bases	Spain	No	Yes	?	Neo-Nazism/National Anarchism		
	Spanish Circle of Friends of Europe	Spain	No	Yes (1966)	No	Neo-Nazism		Disbanded 1993
	España 2000	Spain	No	Yes (2002)	Yes	Patriotic, Neo-Nazi		
	FE y de las JONS	Spain	No	No (1934)	No	Falangism		
	FET y de las JONS	Spain	Yes	No (1937)	No	Falangism, Francoism		
	FE y de las JONS (1976)	Spain	No	Yes (1976)	Yes	Falangism		
	The Phalanx	Spain	No	Yes (1999)	Yes	Falangism		
	National Alliance	Spain	No	Yes (2006)	Yes	Neo-Nazism		
	National Democracy	Spain	No	Yes (1995)	Yes	Neo-Nazism		
	Bodu Bala Sena	Sri Lanka	No	Yes	Yes	Ethno-fascism		
	Archdiocese of the Goths and the Northlands	Sweden	No	Yes (2008)	Yes	Neo-Nazism		
	Clerical People's Party	Sweden	No	No (1930)	No	Clerical fascism		
	National Socialist Workers' Party	Sweden	No	No (1933)	No	Nazism		Became Swedish Socialist Coalition (Swedish: Svensk Socialistisk Samling) in 1938
	National Socialist Bloc	Sweden	No	No (1933)	No	Nazism		Formed from the merger of Nationalsocialistiska Samlingspartiet and Nationalsocialistiska Förbundet and, later, Nationalsocialistisk Samling
	Nordic Realm Party	Sweden	No	Yes (1956)	No	Neo-Nazism		
	Swedish National Socialist Farmers' and Workers' Party	Sweden	No	No (1924)	No	Nazism, Agrarianism		Merged with the Swedish National Socialist Party
	Swedish National Socialist Party	Sweden	No	No (1936)	No	Nazism		
	White Aryan Resistance	Sweden	No	Yes (1991)	No	Neo-Nazism		Paramilitary group active between 1991 and 1993.
	National Alliance	Sweden	No	Yes (1993)	No	Neo-Nazism		Founded as Young National Socialists of Stockholm (Swedish: Stockholms Unga Nationalsocialister (SUNS)) in 1993. Became the National Alliance in 1996.
	National Socialist Front	Sweden	No	Yes (1994)	No	Neo-Nazism		Disbanded in 2008
	Swedish Resistance Movement	Sweden	No	Yes (1995)	Yes	Neo-Nazism		Militant organization.
	National Youth	Sweden	No	Yes (1997)	Yes	Neo-Nazism		Youth organisation of the Swedish Resistance Movement
	Legion Wasa	Sweden	No	Yes (1999)	No	Neo-Nazism		Militant organization
	Party of the Swedes	Sweden	No	Yes (2008)	No	Ethnic nationalist, Swedish nationalist, Neo-Nazism		Successor of National Socialist Front, first founded under the name People's Front (Swedish: Folkfronten). Disbanded in 2015.
	Eidgenössische Sammlung	Switzerland	No	No (1940)	No	Nazism		Successor movement to the National Front
	National Front	Switzerland	No	No (1930)	No	Nazism/independent		
	National Movement of Switzerland	Switzerland	No	No (1940)	No	Nazism		
	National Union	Switzerland	No	No (1932)	No	Nazism/independent		Francophone group
	Swiss Nationalist Party	Switzerland	No	Yes (2000)	No	Völkism, Neo-Nazism		
	Volkspartei der Schweiz	Switzerland	No	Yes (1951)	No	Neo-Nazism		Led by Gaston-Armand Amaudruz
	League of Nationalist Action	Syria	No	No (1932)	No	Fascism		Was founded in 1932 in Syria.
	Syrian Social Nationalist Party	Syria, Lebanon	No	No (1932)	Yes	Fascism		Advocates the establishment of a Greater Syrian national state, including present Syria, Lebanon, the Hatay Province of Turkey, Israel, the Palestinian territories, the Sinai Peninsula of Egypt, Cyprus, Jordan, Iraq, and Kuwait.
	National Socialism Association	Taiwan	No	Yes (2007)	Yes	Han ultranationalism Neo-Nazism		
	Grey Wolves	Turkey	No	Yes (1968)	No	Independent		Terrorist organization
	Republican Villagers Nation Party	Turkey	Yes (as part of coalition governments: 1962, 1965)	Yes (1958)	No	Far-right nationalism, neo-fascism, third position		Precursor of the Nationalist Movement Party.
	National Activity and Vigorous Development	Turkey	No	Yes (1969)	No	Neo-Nazism		A National Socialist group existed in 1969 in İzmir, when a group of former CKMP members (precursor party of the MHP) founded the association "Nasyonal Aktivite ve Zinde İnkişaf" (NAZİ). The club maintained two combat units. The members wore SA uniforms and used the Hitler salute. One of the leaders (Gündüz Kapancıoğlu) was re-admitted to the MHP in 1975.
	Nationalist Movement Party	Turkey	Yes (as part of coalition governments: 1975, 1977, 1999)	Yes (1969)	Yes	Far-right nationalism, neo-fascism		Described as a neo-fascist party linked to extremist and violent militias: Grey Wolves.

Overview A-F G-M N-T U-Z
