= List of Falangist movements =

The following is a list of movements, both active and defunct, whose ideological beliefs are categorized as falangist. This includes political parties, terrorist cells/networks, radical paramilitary groups, criminal gangs, social clubs, organized crime syndicates, websites, internet forums, football hooligan firms, religious sects, and other organizations alike.

== List ==
- Argentina – Tacuara Nationalist Movement, Authentic Falange
- Bolivia – Bolivian Socialist Falange
- Chile – Revolutionary National Syndicalist Movement of Chile, Spanish Action Circle
- Colombia – National Patriotic Falange of Colombia
- Cuba – Cuban Falange
- Ecuador – Ecuadorian Nationalist Revolutionary Alliance, Ecuadorian Garcian National Phalanx
- France – Phalange Française (1955-1958)
- Germany – Christian Falangist Party of Germany (2006-2009)
- Lebanon – Kataeb Party
- Mexico – National Synarchist Union, Organización Nacional del Yunque
- Peru – Falange Peru, Falange Universitaria, Escalones Juveniles Nacionalistas
- Philippines –Philippine Falange, Philippine Falangist Front
- Poland – National Radical Camp Falanga (1934)
- Puerto Rico – Boricua Falange, National Syndicalist Movement of Puerto Rico
- Spain – Spanish Falange (1933-1934), Authentic Falange
- United States – Christian Falangist Party of America, Christian Phalange Organization, National Syndical American Falangist Party
- Venezuela – Authentic Nationalist Party, Falange Venezolana
- Texas – Texas Falangist Front

== See also ==
- Falange (disambiguation)
- List of white nationalist organizations
- List of neo-Nazi organizations
- List of fascist movements by country
