= List of fascist movements by country G–M =

A list of political parties, organizations, and movements adhering to various forms of fascist ideology, part of the list of fascist movements by country.

== Fascist movements, sorted by country ==
Overview A–F G–M N–T U–Z

Logo	Name of movement	Country of predominant operation	Came to power?	Founded post-World War II?	Active?	General influence	Flag	Notes
	Action Front of National Socialists/National Activists	Germany	No	Yes (1977)	No	Nazism		Banned in 1983
	Artgemeinschaft	Germany	No	Yes (1951)	No	Esoteric Nazism		Banned in 2023
	Black Front	Germany	No	No (1930)	No	Strasserism		Banned in 1933
	German Heathen Front	Germany	No	Yes (1998)	No	Neo-Nazism		
	German Reich Party	Germany	No	Yes (1950)	No	Neo-Nazism		
	Free German Workers' Party	Germany	No	Yes (1977)	No	Neo-Nazism/Strasserism		Split in the late 1980s; banned 1995
	German Alternative	Germany	No	Yes (1989)	No	Neo-Nazism		
	German Social Union	Germany	No	Yes (1956)	No	Strasserism		
	German Workers' Party	Germany	No	No (1919)	No	Völkism		Succeeded by the National Socialist German Workers' Party
	Military-sports-group Hoffmann	Germany	No	Yes (1973)	No	Neo-Nazism		Fascist terrorist gang
	National Socialist German Workers' Party	Germany	Yes	No (1920)	No	Nazism		Succeeded by the Socialist Reich Party (de facto)
	Nationalist Front	Germany	No	Yes (1985)	No	Strasserism		Banned in 1992.
	National Offensive	Germany	No	Yes (1990)	No	Neo-Nazism		Banned in 1992.
	National Democratic Party of Germany	Germany	No	Yes	Yes	Neo-Nazism		
	The Immortals	Germany	No	Yes	No	Neo-Nazism		
	The III. Way	Germany	No	Yes (2013)	Yes	Neo-Nazism		
	The Right	Germany	No	Yes (2012)	Yes	Neo-Nazism		
	Socialist Reich Party	Germany	No	Yes (1949)	No	Neo-Nazism		Fragmented from German Empire Party; banned 1952
	Wiking-Jugend	Germany	No	Yes (1952)	No	Neo-Nazism		
	HIAG	West Germany	No	Yes (1951)	No	Neo-Nazism		Fragmented from German Empire Party; banned 1952
	Front Line	Greece	No	Yes (1999)	No	Metaxism		
	General Popular Radical Union	Greece	Yes	No (1932)	No	independent, Italian fascism		Led by Georgios Kondylis
	Golden Dawn	Greece	No	Yes (1980)	Yes	Metaxism, Neo-Nazism		
	Greek National Socialist Party	Greece	No	No (1932)	No	Nazism		Founded by George S. Mercouris
	Hellenic Socialist Patriotic Organisation	Greece	No	No (1941)	No	Nazism		
	National Party – Greeks	Greece	No	Yes (2020)	de facto banned	Neo-fascism		Split from Golden Dawn
	National Political Union	Greece	No	Yes (1984)	No	Metaxism		Founded by Georgios Papadopoulos
	National Popular Consciousness	Greece	No	Yes (2019)	No	Metaxism, Neo-Nazism		Split from Golden Dawn
	National Reform Party	Greece	No	No (1935)	No	Italian fascism		
	National Union of Greece	Greece	No	No (1927)	No	independent		
	Freethinkers' Party	Greece	No (its leader did)	No (1922)	No	Metaxism		The political party led by future Greek dictator Ioannis Metaxas
	Spartans	Greece	No	Yes (2017)	Yes	Neo-fascism		National Party merged into them
	National Unity Party	Haiti	Yes	Yes (1957)	No	Tropical fascism		Founded by François Duvalier
	Arrow Cross Party	Hungary	Yes	No (1935)	No	Hungarist		Founded as “Party of National Will”
	Christian National Socialist Front	Hungary	No	No (1937)	No	Nazism		
	Hungarian National Socialist Agricultural Labourers' and Workers' Party	Hungary	No	No (1932)	No	Nazism		
	Hungarian National Defence Association	Hungary	No	No (1919)	No	independent/Italian Fascism		Also known as Szeged Fascists
	Hungarian National Front	Hungary	No	Yes (1989)	No	Neo-Nazism		
	Hungarian National Socialist Party	Hungary	No	No (1920s–1930s)	No	independent/Nazism		Name used by several groups
	National Front	Hungary	No	No (1936)	No	Nazism		
	Pax Hungarica Movement	Hungary	No	Yes (2008)	No	Neo-Nazism		
	United Hungarian National Socialist Party	Hungary	No	No (1932)	No	Nazism		
	Unity Party	Hungary	Yes	No (1922)	No	Szeged Idea		
	Norræna Mótstöðuhreyfingin (Norðurvígi) (Nordic Resistance Movement, Icelandic branch)	Iceland	No	Yes (2016)	Yes	Neo-Nazism		
	Party of Nationalists	Iceland	No	No (1934)	No	Fascism		
	Ríkisflokkurinn (The State Party)	Iceland	No	Yes (1960)	No	Neo-Nazism		
	Skjöldur Íslands (Iceland's Shield)	Iceland	No	Yes (2025)	Yes	White Nationalism		
	Hindutva	India	Yes	No (1922)	Yes	Fascism		Although it is mainstream in India, several scholars and experts consider it to be fascist.
	Aria Party	Iran	No	Yes (1946)	No	independent		
	Azure Party	Iran	No	No (1942)	No	Fascism, Nazism		
	Nation Party of Iran	Iran	No	Yes (1951)	Yes	independent		
	Pan-Iranist Party	Iran	No	No (1941)	Yes	Independent		
	Sumka	Iran	No	Yes (1952)	Yes	Nazism		Founded by Dr. Davud Monshizadeh in December 6, 1941 (unofficially) or October 13, 1952 (officially)
	Resurrection Party of the Iranian Nation	Iran	Yes	Yes (1975)	No	Fascism		
	Al-Muthanna Club	Iraq	No	No (1935)	No	Nazism		Founded by former Iraqi cabinet minister Saib Shawkat
	Hawpa	Iraq	No	Yes (2020)	Yes	Neo-Nazism		
	Ailtirí na hAiséirghe ("Architects of the Resurrection")	Ireland	No	No (1942)	No	Fascism, Irish nationalism		Founded by Gearóid Ó Cuinneagáin
	Córas na Poblachta ("Republican System")	Ireland	No	No (1940)	No	Fascism, Irish nationalism		
	National Socialist Irish Workers Party	Ireland	No	Yes (1968)	No	Neo-Nazism		Dissolved in late 1980s
	National Corporate Party	Ireland	No	No (1934)	No	Clerical Fascism		Member of the Fascist International
	Army Comrades Association	Ireland	No	No (1932)	No	Fascism, Irish nationalism		Founded by Eoin O'Duffy, better known as the Blueshirts
	Brit HaBirionim	Israel (then the British Mandate of Palestine)	No	No (1930)	No	Italian Fascism, Revisionist Maximalism		Founded by of Dr. Abba Ahimeir, Uri Zvi Greenberg and Dr. Joshua Yeivin.
	Kach	Israel	No	Yes (1971)	No	Kahanism, Halachic state, Zionism		Founded by Rabbi Meir Kahane, banned in 1994.
	Lehi	Israel (then the British Mandate of Palestine)	No	No (1940)	No	Fascism, Revisionist Zionism, National Bolshevism		
	Patrol 36	Israel	No	Yes (2005)	No	Neo-Nazism, Antisemitism		
	Armed Revolutionary Nuclei	Italy	No	Yes (1977)	No	Italian Fascism		Terrorist organization
	CasaPound	Italy	No	Yes (2003)	Yes	Italian Fascism		Founded by Gianluca Iannone
	Fascism and Freedom Movement	Italy	No	Yes (1991)	Yes	Italian Fascism		Founded by Giorgio Pisanò
	Fasci Italiani di Combattimento	Italy	No	No (1919)	No	Italian Fascism		Succeeded by PNF
	New Force	Italy	No	Yes	Yes	Italian Fascism		
	National Front	Italy	No	Yes (1997)	Yes	Italian Fascism		Broke from Tricolour Flame; member of Alternativa Sociale
	Italian Social Movement	Italy	No	Yes (1946)	No	Italian Fascism		MSI
	National Fascist Party (PNF)	Italy	Yes	No (1921)	No	Italian Fascism		Disbanded 1943; succeeded by PFR
	National Vanguard (PNF)	Italy	No	Yes (1960)	No	Neo-Nazism		
	Ordine Nuovo	Italy	No	Yes (1956)	No	Italian Fascism		Terrorist organization
	Ordine Nero	Italy	No	Yes (1974)	No	Italian Fascism		Terrorist organization
	Republican Fascist Party (PFR)	Italy (RSI)	Yes	No (1943)	No	Italian Fascism		Disbanded 1945; succeeded by MSI
	Terza Posizione	Italy	No	Yes (1979)	No	Independent		Disbanded 1980
	Tricolour Flame	Italy	No	Yes (1995)	Yes	Italian Fascism		Splinter group of MSI
	National Socialist Japanese Workers' Party	Japan	No	Yes	Yes	Neo-Nazism		
	Nippon Kaigi	Japan	Yes	Yes	Yes	Japanese ultranationalism, historical revisionism, Kokkashugi		
	Imperial Aid Association	Japan	Yes	No (1940)	No	Japanese imperialism, Japanese militarism, Japanese ultranationalism, National conservatism, Pan-Asianism		Dissolved in 1945
	Tohokai ("Eastern Society")	Japan	No	No (1936)	No	Japanese fascism		In October 1940 it briefly merged into the Imperial Rule Assistance Association which it later broke away from in 1941, banned after the war.
	Korean National Youth Association	Korea	No	Yes (1946)	No	Fascism		
	Thunder Cross	Latvia	No	No (1932)	Yes	Independent		Banned after 1944; reformed after the resumption of Latvian independence
	German National Movement in Liechtenstein	Liechtenstein	No	No (1938)	No	Nazism		
	Liechtenstein Homeland Service	Liechtenstein	No	No (1933)	No	Corporate statism, Nazism (later)		
	Kataeb Party	Lebanon	Yes	No (1936)	Yes	Falangism (former)		Moved to centre-right, Christian Democracy
	Kokumin Dōmei	Japan	No	No (1932)	No	Japanese fascism		Dissolved on 26 July 1940, merged into the Imperial Rule Assistance Association
	Kuomintang-Nanjing	China	Yes	No (1939)	No	Fascism		Established by Chinese Collaborators in China during the Second Sino-Japanese War; dissolved on 16 August 1945.
	Iron Wolves	Lithuania	Yes	No (1927)	No	Clerical fascism		Movement within the Clerical Party
	Union of Christian Socialist Workers of the Memel Region	Memel Territory (today Lithuania)	Yes	No (1927)	No	Nazism		Banned
	Imperium Europa	Malta	No	Yes (2000)	Yes	Neo-fascism		
	Concordia Association	Manchukuo	Yes	No (1931)	No	Fascism, Manchurian nationalism		
	Russian Fascist Organization	Manchukuo	No	No (1925)	No	Italian Fascism, Russian nationalism		Within the Russian emigrants
	Russian Fascist Party	Manchukuo	No	No (1931)	No	Italian Fascism, Russian nationalism		Within the Russian emigrants
	Gold Shirts	Mexico	No	No (1933)	No	Fascism		Banned after Mexico joined the Allies in 1942
	Mexican Fascist Party	Mexico	No	No (1923)	No	Italian Fascism		
	Nationalist Front of Mexico	Mexico	No	Yes (2006)	Yes	Neo-fascism		
	Partido Nacional-Socialista de México	Mexico	No	Yes	Yes	Neo-Nazism		
	Dayar Mongol	Mongolia	No	Yes	Yes	Neo-Nazism, Sinophobia, Resource nationalism		
	Tsagaan Khas	Mongolia	No	Yes (1990)	Yes	Neo-Nazism, Sinophobia, Resource nationalism		

Overview A-F G-M N-T U-Z
