= List of fascist movements by country A–F =

A list of political parties, organizations, and movements adhering to various forms of fascist ideology, part of the list of fascist movements by country.

== List of movements, sorted by country ==
Overview A–F G–M N–T U–Z

Logo	Name of movement	Country of predominant operation	Came to power?	Founded post-World War II?	Active?	General influence	Flag	Notes
	Albanian Fascist Party	Albania	Yes	No (1939)	No	Italian fascism		Became Guard of Great Albania in 1943
	Argentine Fascist Party	Argentina	No	No (1932)	No	Italian fascism		Successor of the National Fascist Party
	Argentine Nationalist Action	Argentina	No	No (1932)	No	Italian fascism		
	National Fascist Party	Argentina	No	No (1923)	No	Italian fascism		
	National Fascist Union	Argentina	No	No (1936)	No	Italian fascism, Falangism		Successor of the Argentine Fascist Party
	Nationalist Liberation Alliance	Argentina	No	No (1931)	No	Italian fascism		Supported by Argentine President General José Félix Uriburu. Originally named Argentine Civic Legion from 1931 to 1937, then the Alliance of Nationalist Youth from 1937 to 1943.
	Patriot Front	Argentina	No	Yes (2017)	Yes	Third Position		
	Republican League	Argentina	No	No (1929)	No	Italian fascism		
	Tacuara Nationalist Movement	Argentina	No	Yes (1957)	No	Falangism, Fascism, Nazism		
	Australia First Movement	Australia	No	No (1941)	No	Fascism, Nazism		Disbanded by the Australian government in 1942
	Centre Party	Australia	No	No (1933)	No	Fascism		Evolved from the New Guard (1931).
	Austrian National Socialism	Austria	Yes	No (1902)	No	Nazism		
	Fatherland Front	Austria	Yes	No (1933)	No	Austro-fascism		
	Jeune Europe	Belgium	No	Yes (1962)	No	Neo-fascism		
	Parti Communautaire National-Européen	Belgium	No	Yes (1984)	Yes	National Bolshevism		Sometimes active in France
	Rexist Party	Belgium	No	No (1930)	No	Rexism		
	Verdinaso	Belgium	No	No (1931)	No	Fascism		Merged with VNV, 1941
	DeVlag	Belgium	No	No (1936)	No	Nazism		Pan German
	Brazilian Integralist Action	Brazil	No	No (1932)	No	Brazilian integralism		
	Brazilian Integralist Front	Brazil	No	Yes (2005)	Yes	Brazilian integralism		
	National Socialist Bulgarian Workers Party	Bulgaria	No	No (1932)	No	Nazism		
	National Social Movement	Bulgaria	No	No (1932)	No	Nazism		Founded by Aleksandar Tsankov
	Union of Bulgarian National Legions	Bulgaria	No	No (1932)	No	Monarchism, Italian fascism, Nazism		
	Zveno	Bulgaria	Yes	No (1930)	No	Independent		Later became anti-fascist
	Ratniks	Bulgaria	No	No (1936)	No	Nazism		
	Canadian Nationalist Party	Canada	No	No (1933)	No	British fascism, antisemitism		Merged into the National Unity Party of Canada
	Canadian Union of Fascists	Canada	No	No (1934)	No	British fascism		Affiliated with the British Union of Fascists
	National Unity Party of Canada	Canada	No	No (1934)	No	Nazism		
	Fatherland and Liberty	Chile	No	Yes (1971)	No	Neo-fascism		Involved in the Tanquetazo
	National Socialist Movement of Chile	Chile	No	No (1932)	No	Nazism		Became Vanguardia Popular Socialista in 1939; more Chilean Nazi groups at (in Spanish)
	Blue Shirts Society	China	No	No (1932)	No	Fascism		The Blue Shirts Society was a fascist clique within the Kuomintang.
	Ustaše	Croatia	Yes	No (1929)	No	Croatian socialism		
	National Popular Front	Cyprus	No	Yes (2008)	Yes	Neo-fascism, Metaxism		
	National Fascist Community (NOF)	Czechoslovakia	No	No (1926)	No	Fascism		Founded and led by Radola Gajda.
	Sudeten German Party (SdP)	Czechoslovakia	No	No (1933)	No	Nazism		Party of the German minority. Led by Konrad Henlein. After the annexation of Czechoslovakia in 1938, SdP was merged into the NSDAP.
	Vlajka	Czechoslovakia	No	No (1928)	No	Fascism		Collaborationist movement. Banned 1942
	Danish Unity (DS)	Denmark	No	No (1936)	Yes	Independent		Started as a party with fascist sympathies but became anti-fascist during the German occupation
	National Socialist Workers' Party of Denmark (DNSAP)	Denmark	No	No (1930)	No	Nazism		Banned 1945. Succeeded by the National Socialist Movement of Denmark.
	Young Egypt Party	Egypt	No	No (1933)	No	Fascism		
	Vaps Movement	Estonia	No	No (1929)	No	Fascism		Banned in 1935
	National Pro Patria Party	El Salvador	Yes	No (1933)	No	Fascism		
	Blue Cross	Finland	No	No (1942)	No	Nazism		
	Blue-and-Black Movement	Finland	No	Yes (2021)	Yes	Neo-fascism		
	Finnish Labor Front	Finland	No	No (1936)	No	Nazism		
	Finnish National Socialist Labor Organisation	Finland	No	No (1940)	No	Nazism		
	Finnish People's Organisation	Finland	No	No (1933)	No	Nazism		
	Finnish-Socialist Workers' Party	Finland	No	No (1929)	No	Independent		
	Labor Organisation of Brothers-in-Arms	Finland	No	No (1942)	No	Nazism, agrarianism		
	Lalli Alliance of Finland	Finland	No	No (1929)	No	Fascism		
	Lapua Movement	Finland	No	No (1929)	No	Independent		Banned 1932; Became IKL
	National Socialist Union of Finland	Finland	No	No (1932)	No	Strasserism		
	National Socialists of Finland	Finland	No	No (1941)	No	Nazism		
	Organisation of National Socialists	Finland	No	No (1940)	No	Nazism		
	Party of Finnish Labor	Finland	No	No (1932)	No	Nazism		
	Patriotic People's Movement	Finland	Yes (Rangell cabinet)	No (1932)	No	Independent		Successor to Lapua Movement. Banned 1944.
	Patriotic People's Party	Finland	No	No (1932)	No	Nazism		
	People's Community Society	Finland	No	No (1940)	No	Nazism		
	Rising Finland	Finland	No	No (1940)	No	Syncretism, Nazism		
	Stormers	Finland	No	No (1933)	No	Fascism		
	Breton National Party	France	No	No (1931)	No	Fascism, Breton nationalism		
	La Cagoule	France	No	No (1935)	No	Fascism		
	Mouvement Franciste	France	No	No (1933)	No	Fascism		
	The Fasces	France	No	No (1925)	No	Independent		Disbanded 1928
	French National-Collectivist Party	France	No	No (1934)	No	Fascism		
	Breton Social-National Workers' Movement	France	No	No (1941)	No	Fascism, Breton nationalism		
	Jeune Nation	France	No	Yes (1949)	No	Neo-fascism		
	L'Œuvre Française	France	No	Yes (1968)	No	Neo-Pétainism		
	National Popular Rally	France	Yes	No (1941)	No	Fascism, Neo-Jacobinism		
	Ordre Nouveau	France	No	Yes (1969)	No	Neo-Fascism		
	French Popular Party	France	No	No (1936)	No	Fascism		Founded by Jacques Doriot
	Phalange Française	France	No	Yes (1955)	No	Falangism		Founded by Charles Luca, relative of French fascist Marcel Deat.
	Social Bastion	France	No	Yes (2017)	No	Neo-fascism		
	Third Way	France	No	Yes (1985)	No	Third Position		

Overview A-F G-M N-T U-Z
