= National Socialism (disambiguation) =

National Socialism most often refers to Nazism, the ideology of the Nazi Party, which ruled Germany from 1933 to 1945.

National Socialism may also refer to:

== Ethnic German movements related to Nazism (pre-1945) ==
- Austrian National Socialism, an early influence on the NSDAP
- German National Socialist Workers' Party (Czechoslovakia) (Sudeten German, antisemitic)
- Sudeten German Party (Sudeten German, pro-annexation by Germany, successor of the above)
- Strasserism, a sect of German National Socialism in direct opposition to Hitlerism within the NSDAP

== Non-German movements related to Nazism (pre-1945) ==
- National Socialist Bulgarian Workers Party (1930s)
- National Unity Party of Canada (pro-Anglo-Canadian/French-Canadian)
- National Socialist Movement of Chile (1930s)
- National Socialist Workers' Party of Denmark (German-style Nazi, antisemitic)
- British Union of Fascists (1932–1940)
- National Socialist League (United Kingdom) (1937–1939)
- Greek National Socialist Party (Italian-style fascist, pro-Hitler)
- Hungarian National Socialist Party (German-style Nazi, antisemitic)
- National Socialist Dutch Workers Party (1920s–1930s; favoured German annexation of the Netherlands)
- National Socialist Movement in the Netherlands (1930s–1940s; unlike the above, it nominally supported an independent Netherlands)
- National Socialist Workers' Party of Norway (German-style Nazi, antisemitic)
- Nasjonal Samling (Norwegian, German-style Nazi, antisemitic, anti-Masonic)
- National Socialist Party (Romania) (Romanian, German-style Nazi)
- Swedish National Socialist Farmers' and Workers' Party (pro-Hitler, founded in 1924)
- Swedish National Socialist Party (founded in 1930 through a merger of Nazi and fascist groups)
- National Socialist Workers' Party (Sweden) (split from the above in 1933, became more Strasserite and independently Swedish before declining during World War II)
- South African Gentile National Socialist Movement (1930s–1940s; pro-apartheid, white, antisemitic)

== Neo-Nazism (after 1945) ==
=== Australia ===
- Australian National Socialist Party (founded 1962), merged into
  - National Socialist Party of Australia (1968–1970s)
- National Socialist Network (contemporary)

=== UK ===
- National Socialist Action Party (British, founded in 1982, historical)
- National Socialist Movement (UK, 1962) (British, founded in 1962, historical)
- National Socialist Movement (UK, 1997) (British, contemporary)

=== US ===
- National Socialist League (United States) (American, gay, Aryan, pro-Hitler, historical)
- National Socialist Movement (United States) (American, contemporary)
- National Socialist Party of America (white, antisemitic, anti-black, historical)

=== Other countries ===
- Golden Dawn (Greece) (anti-Albania, anti-immigrants, islamophobic, contemporary)
- Iranian National Socialist Party (SUMKA), created in 1952 (pro-Hitler, anti-Arab, anti-Turk, historical)
- National Socialist Movement of Denmark (contemporary)
- National Socialist Movement of Norway (contemporary)
- National Socialist Italian Workers' Party (Italian nationalist, anti-immigrant, contemporary)
- National Socialist Party of New Zealand (German-style Nazi, antisemitic, historical)
- Russian National Socialist Party (Russian nationalist, fascist, anti-immigrant, contemporary)
- Social-National Party of Ukraine (Ukrainian nationalist, ethnic nationalist, anti-communist)
- Svoboda (political party) (Ukrainian nationalist, ultranationalist, right-wing populist)

== Other unrelated ideologies and organizations ==
- Popular socialism, its democratic forms are known as national socialism in certain countries
  - Socialist-nationalism, a form of nationalism which is based upon national self-determination, popular sovereignty, and left-wing political positions such as social equality
- Ba'ath Party, an Arab national-socialist party in Iraq and Syria
- Czech National Social Party, founded in Austria-Hungary in 1898 as a centre-left party advocating Czech independence
- Czech National Socialist Party, a small centre-left party which broke away from the above in 2005
- National-Social Association, a small centre-left Christian liberal party in Germany
- National Socialist Party (Jordan), a left-wing political party in Jordan that existed from 1954 to 1957
- National Socialist Party (Philippines), a political party founded in the Philippines in 1935
- National Socialist Party (UK), a breakaway group from the British Socialist Party formed in 1916
- Jatiya Samajtantrik Dal (National Socialist Party), a small socialist party in Bangladesh
- National Socialist Council of Nagaland, a Maoist insurgent group in India
- National Socialist Party of Tripura, a party advocating Tripuri self-determination in India
- Bernsteinism, originally called "revisionism", the first example of a wider trend called by the same name; Lenin referred to it as "national socialism"

== See also ==
- Far-right politics
- Far-right terrorism
- Fascism
