= RNSP =

RNSP can refer to:

- Redwood National and State Parks, in the United States, created in 1968
- Russian National Socialist Party, neo-Nazi party formed in 1998
