= Falanga =

Falanga may refer to:

- 3M11 Falanga, an anti-tank missile
- Falanga (torture), a form of torture wherein the soles of the feet are beaten
- National Radical Camp Falanga (1935-1939), a Polish political group
  - National-Radical Movement "Falanga"
- Falanga (organisation), a Polish political group founded in 2009 by former National Radical Camp member Bartosz Bekier

== See also ==
- Falange (disambiguation)
- Phalanx (disambiguation)
