= List of fascist movements by country U–Z =

A list of political parties, organizations, and movements adhering to various forms of fascist ideology, part of the list of fascist movements by country.

== Fascist movements, sorted by country ==
Overview A–F G–M N–T U–Z

Logo	Name of movement	Country of predominant operation	Came to power?	Founded post-World War II?	Active?	General affiliation	Flag	Notes
	National Corps	Ukraine	No	Yes (2016)	Yes	Third Position		
	Organization of Ukrainian Nationalists	Ukraine	No	No (1929)	No	Ukrainian ultranationalism, anti-communism		Perpetrators of the Lviv pogroms.
	Patriot of Ukraine	Ukraine	No	Yes (2005)	No	Ukrainian ultranationalism		Splinter group formed after the SNPU's rebrand into Svoboda. Was the primary movement of the Social-National Assembly. Merged into the National Corps
	Right Sector	Ukraine	No	Yes (2013)	Yes	Ukrainian ultranationalism		Started as a confederation of right-wing organizations and groups during the Euromaidan until it became an official party in 2014
	S14	Ukraine	No	Yes (2010)	No	Neo-fascism, Neo-Nazism		
	Social-National Assembly	Ukraine	No	Yes (2008)	No	Ukrainian ultranationalism, Neo-Nazism		An assemblage of ultra-nationalist radical organizations built around the "Patriot of Ukraine" movement. Merged into the National Corps.
	Social-National Party of Ukraine	Ukraine	No	Yes (1991)	No	Ukrainian ultranationalism		Gave rise to Svoboda (political party)
	All-Ukrainian Union "Freedom"	Ukraine	No	Yes (1995)	Yes	Ukrainian ultranationalism		Emerged from Social-National Party of Ukraine
	Ukrainian National Assembly	Ukraine	No	Yes (1990)	No	Third Position		
	Ukrainian National Union	Ukraine	No	Yes (2009)	Yes	Ukrainian ultranationalism		
	Blood and Honour	United Kingdom	No	Yes (1987)	Yes	Neo-Nazism		Gave rise to Combat 18
	Britain First	United Kingdom	No	Yes (2011)	Yes	British fascism, Neo-fascism, Ultranationalism		
	British Fascisti	United Kingdom	No	No (1923)	No	British fascism, Ultra-royalism, National conservatism, Anti-socialism		Later became British Fascists; Parent group of National Fascisti
	British Movement	United Kingdom	No	Yes (1962)	No	Neo-Nazism		Formerly National Socialist Movement, but not the same as that in National Socialist Movement; parent group of Greater Britain Movement and National Socialist Action Party; liquidated 1983
	British National Front	United Kingdom	No	Yes (1967)	Yes	British National Party, Ethnonationalism (under O'Brien, Kingsley Read, Anderson and Wingfield) Neo-Nazism (under Tyndall, McAuley and Tom Holmes)		Formed from British National Party (1960s); gave rise to British National Party and splinter groups British Democratic Party (1979), National Party (UK, 1976), National Democrats (UK), Constitutional Movement
	British National Party (1960s)	United Kingdom	No	Yes (1962)	No	British National Party		Gave rise to British National Front; formed from National Labour Party (UK 1950s) and White Defence League; disbanded 1967
	British National Party	United Kingdom	No	Yes (1982)	Yes	British fascism		
	British People's Party (2005)	United Kingdom	No	Yes (2005)	No	British Fascism		Member of the World Union of National Socialists
	British People's Party (1939)	United Kingdom	No	No (1939)	No	British fascism		
	British Union of Fascists	United Kingdom	No	No (1932)	No	British fascism		Gave rise to splinter groups: British Peoples Party and National Socialist League; banned 1940
	Combat 18	United Kingdom	No	Yes (1991)	Yes	Neo-Nazism		Formed from Blood & Honour
	Constitutional Movement	United Kingdom	No	Yes (1979)	No	British National Party Ethnonationalism		Splinter group of the British National Front; disbanded 1984
	Flag Group	United Kingdom	No	Yes (1980s)	No	British National Party ethnonationalism		wing of the British National Front
	Greater Britain Movement	United Kingdom	No	Yes (1964)	No	Neo-Nazism		Splinter group of British Movement; dissolved 1967
	Imperial Fascist League	United Kingdom	No	No (1929)	No	Italian Fascism then Nazism		
	League of St. George	United Kingdom	No	Yes	Yes	Neo-Nazism		
	National Action	United Kingdom	No	Yes (2013)	Yes	Neo-Nazism		
	National Democrats (UK)	United Kingdom	No	Yes (1995)	No	British National Party ethnonationalism		Splinter group of the British National Front
	National Fascisti	United Kingdom	No	No (1924)	No	Italian Fascism		Splinter group of British Fascisti
	National Labour Party (UK 1950s)	United Kingdom	No	Yes (1957)	No	British National Party Ethnonationalism, Corporatism		merged with White Defence League to form British National Party (1960s) in 1960; splinter group of the League of Empire Loyalists, not a fascist organization
	National Party (UK, 1976)	United Kingdom	No	Yes (1976)	No	British National Party Ethnonationalism		Splinter group of the British National Front
	National Socialist Action Party	United Kingdom	No	Yes (1982)	No	Neo-Nazism		Splinter group of British Movement
	National Socialist League	United Kingdom	No	No (1937)	No	Nazism		splinter group of British Union of Fascists; disbanded 1939
	National Socialist Movement	United Kingdom	No	Yes (1962)	No	Neo-Nazism		Founded by Colin Jordan as Nazi-admiring fascist group; military organisation; collapsed 1968 and re-formed as British Movement
	National Socialist Movement	United Kingdom	No	Yes (1997)	No	Neo-Nazism		Splinter group of Combat 18
	Nationalist Alliance	United Kingdom	No	Yes (2005)	No	Neo-Nazism		absorbed White Nationalist Party and England First Party in 2005
	New British Union	United Kingdom	No	Yes (2012)	Yes	British Fascism		
	New Party	United Kingdom	No	No (1930)	No	Mosleyism		Became British Union of Fascists
	November 9th Society	United Kingdom	No	Yes (1977)	Yes	Neo-Nazism		
	Official National Front	United Kingdom	No	Yes (1980s)	No	British National Front, Ethnonationalist		Arose from Political Soldier
	Political Soldier	United Kingdom	No	Yes (1970s)	No	Third Position, Romanian fascism		wing of the British National Front; left BNF to form Official National Front
	Racial Preservation Society	United Kingdom	No	Yes (1965)	No	White Nationalism		
	Racial Volunteer Force	United Kingdom	No	Yes (2002)	Yes	Neo-Nazism		Breakaway group from Combat 18
	System Resistance Network	United Kingdom	No	Yes (2017)	Yes	Neo-Nazism		
	The Britons	United Kingdom	No	No (1919)	No	Racial discrimination		
	Union Movement	United Kingdom	No	Yes (1948)	No	British Union of Fascists, Mosleyism		became Action Party in 1973; ceased political activity 1978
	White Defence League	United Kingdom	No	Yes (1958)	No	Neo-Nazism		Merged with National Labour Party (UK 1950s) to form British National Party (1960s) in 1960; splinter group of the League of Empire Loyalists, not a fascist organization
	White Nationalist Party	United Kingdom	No	Yes (2002)	No	British National Front, Ethnonationalism, White separatism		absorbed by Nationalist Alliance; disbanded 2005
	White Wolves	United Kingdom	No	Yes (1990s?)	No	Leaderless Resistance, Neo-Nazism		
	All-Russian Fascist Organisation	United States	No	No (1933)	No	Fascism, Russian nationalism		Within the Russian emigrants.
	Fascist League of North America	United States	No	No (1924)	No	Italian Fascism		organization founded by Italian Americans affiliated with Fasci all'estero of the National Fascist Party of Italy.
	Identity Evropa	United States	No	Yes (2016)	No	Neo-Nazism		
	Patriot Front	United States	No	Yes (2017)	Yes	Neo-fascism		
	Silver Legion of America	United States	No	No (1933)	No	independent		
	Vanguard America	United States	No	Yes (2015)	No	Neo-Nazism, Neo-fascism		
	Falange Venezolana	Venezuela	No	?	Yes	Falangism, Legionarism		official site
	Nuevo Orden - NOR	Venezuela	No	Yes (1974)	No	Neo-Fascism, Pan-Americanism		
	ORJUNA	Yugoslavia	No	No (1922)	No	Italian Fascism		Successor of the Yugoslav Progressive Nationalist Youth
	Yugoslav Progressive Nationalist Youth	Yugoslavia	No	No (1921)	No	Italian Fascism		Became Orjuna in 1922
	Yugoslav Radical Union	Yugoslavia	Yes	No (1934)	No	Italian Fascism		Dissolved 1941
	ZBOR	Yugoslavia	No	No (1935)	No	Independent		After the partition of Yugoslavia, ZBOR was renamed "National Movement ZBOR" and functioned on the Territory of the Military Commander in Serbia

Overview A-F G-M N-T U-Z
