= Falange =

Falange (Spanish: Phalanx) primarily refers to:

- Falange Española, a Spanish political party active 1933–1934, it merged with the Juntas de Ofensiva Nacional-Sindicalista (JONS)
- Falange Española de las JONS, a Spanish political party active 1934–1937
- Falange Española Tradicionalista y de las JONS, formed in 1937 of the merger of the Carlist Party with the Falange Española y de las JONS

Falange may also refer to other political parties:

- Falange Española de las JONS (1976), Spanish political party founded in 1976
- La Falange (1999), Spanish political party founded in 1999
- Authentic Falange, Spanish political party founded in 2002
- Bolivian Socialist Falange, Bolivian party founded in 1937
- Lebanese Phalanges Party, another name of the Kataeb Party, a Lebanese party
- National Falange, Chilean party founded in 1935 and dissolved in 1957

- Christian Democratic Party (Chile), founded in 1957, successor of the National Falange

== See also ==
- List of Falangist movements
- Falangism in Latin America
- Falangist Spain
- Falanga (disambiguation)
- Phalanx (disambiguation)
- Phalanges, bones in the hands and feet
