= Socialist Association "Polish People" =

1880s Polish political organization in Geneva

Socialist Association "Polish People" Socjalistyczne Stowarzyszenie „Lud Polski”
- Abbreviation: SSLP
- Leader: Bolesław Limanowski
- Founder: Bolesław Limanowski
- Founded: August 1881
- Preceded by: Polish Socialist Association "Równość"
- Succeeded by: National-Socialist Commune
- Headquarters: Geneva
- Ideology: Revolutionary socialism Libertarian socialism Polish nationalism Feminism; Secularism
- Political position: Left-wing to Far-left
- Slogan: "Everything for the People, by the People, in the name of the aspirations of the people!" (Wszystko dla Ludu, przez Lud, w imię dążeń Ludu!)

Socialist Association "Polish People" (Polish: Socjalistyczne Stowarzyszenie „Lud Polski”) was a Polish socialist and nationalist organization that operated in the 1880s in Geneva. Its president and founder was the theorist and historian Bolesław Limanowski.

== History ==
The organization was founded in August 1881 in Geneva by some activists associated with the Polish Socialist Association "Równość" of 1880, created around the magazine Równość, published in Geneva under the direction of Kazimierz Dłuski. It owes its name to the Association of the Polish People, which operated between 1872-1877 and which it intends to revive. In turn, the Association of the Polish People considered itself the ideological heir of the Polish People's Groups. It was composed of Bolesław Limanowski, Zygmunt Balicki, Erazm Kobylański, Kazimierz Sosnowski, Józef Uziembło, Aleksander Zawadzki and others.

Unlike Ludwik Waryński's group, the association was not Marxist in nature, although it was influenced by the thought of Marx and Engels and some of its leaders came into contact with them. It appealed not only to the industrial proletariat, but to the entire people. The main motto of the organization was "Everything for the People, by the People, in the name of the aspirations of the people!". The association openly criticized the Polish nobility and bourgeoisie and accused them of betraying democratic and libertarian ideals. In his appeal, he affirmed that his objective was liberation from the economic, political-national and social yoke; on the other hand, creating, on the basis of social solidarity, the most appropriate conditions for the integral development (physical, mental and moral) of all, and at the same time ensuring the greatest possible individual freedom, regulated solely by solidarity.

The key points of the program were the following:

Abolition of...

- 1) Abolish economic exploitation through:
  - a) Common ownership of workshops (land, factories, tools) and means of production
  - b) Cooperative work
- 2) Abolish political and national oppression through:
  - a) National independence within the limits of voluntary gravity
  - b) Extension of the self-government of communes and lands, limited only by their solidarity
- 3) Free yourself from social slavery through:
  - a) Complete abolition of state classes and privileges
  - b) Full gender equality
  - c) Complete freedom of religion

For Poland, "an independent national existence within the limits of voluntary gravitation" was demanded. The Socialist Association "Polish People" attended the International Socialist Congress at Chur in October 1881, but soon ceased its activities. Its activists largely joined the Liga Polska in 1887 and, above all, they joined the National-Socialist Commune that operated in Paris between 1888 and 1893 and whose leaders were Stanisław Barański, Antoni Lange and Limanowski himself.
