= Party of National Socialists (Poland) =

Party of National Socialists Partia Narodowych Socjalistów
- Abbreviation: PNS
- Leader: Kazimierz Dagnan; Fryderyk Fiałkiewicz
- President: Fryderyk Fiałkiewicz
- Founder: Kazimierz Dagnan
- Founded: 22 June 1933
- Merged into: National Social Camp
- Headquarters: Warsaw, Poland
- Youth wing: Association of National-Socialist Youth
- Ideology: Socialist nationalism Polish nationalism Left-wing nationalism Democratic socialism Third Position; Factions: Anti-German sentiment Anti-clericalism
- Political position: Syncretic
- Slogan: Proletarians of Poland Unite!

The Party of National Socialists (Polish: Partia Narodowych Socjalistów, PNS) was a Nazi party founded on 22 June 1933 by the advocates of Kazimierz Dagnan, an activist of the National Workers' Union and the National Workers' Party.

== History ==
The first president of the PNS was Fryderyk Fiałkiewicz. The party was established as a splinter faction from the National Workers' Party – Left. Subsequently, it was joined by members of the National Socialist Party from Bielsko-Biała and activists from the National Socialist Workers' Party in Kraków, which had dissolved following an internal split.

Logo of the "Zwycięstwo" Kraków faction

The party's official press organ was Narodowy Socjalista (National Socialist). Additionally, several regional publications were issued, including Zwycięstwo in Kraków, Front Narodowo-Socjalistyczny in Vilnius, Polska Błyskawica in Katowice, Wczoraj, Dziś i Jutro in Lviv, and Trybuna Ludu in Łódź. The statutory uniform consisted of steel and gray shirts. The party's official emblem featured a sword, sickle, and hammer intertwined on a white and red shield. However, the Kraków faction rejected this symbol, perceiving it as too closely associated with Marxism, and instead adopted a white three-armed plant (trzywłos, referencing Triglav) with a cross on a red field. The plant symbolized affiliation with the Aryan world and respect for pagan ancestral traditions, while the cross was incorporated similarly to its use in Polish noble heraldry, blending Christian and pre-Christian elements.

In 1935, the PNS made an unsuccessful attempt to merge with the National Labour Party and the National Workers’ Party (NPR) to create the National Labour Camp. The following year, the Union of National Movement became part of the organization. In May 1938, the PNS merged with a faction of the National Labour Party to form the National Community Movement (RNS), and in October 1938, the National Social Party joined the RNS, resulting in the establishment of the National Social Camp.

== Ideology ==
The PNS developed its own variant of National Socialism that was explicitly anti-German and declaredly democratic, distinguishing itself from German Nazism. In seeking historical precedents, it drew inspiration from the nineteenth-century National Socialist Commune and from the thought of Adam Mickiewicz, who argued that socialism should first become national in order to become universal.

The party's stated aim was “the victory of labour over greedy capitalism.” In domestic policy, it called for “undivided power in the state for the Polish working class,” to be achieved through agrarian reform, the nationalization of large industry, and the preservation of parliamentary democracy. Toward Slavic national minorities, it advocated tolerance, while its proposed “solution” to the Jewish question was the emigration of Jews, whom it regarded as “occupiers” of Poland. The party also employed the concept of the “Aryan”.

In foreign policy, the PNS proposed the creation of a bloc of Slavic states and, on a global scale, the establishment of a general union of National Socialist republics. This union was envisioned as a framework for cultural and economic cooperation conducted in harmony while preserving national and political independence.

In matters of social customs, the party adopted a conservative stance, particularly regarding women's rights. It declared attachment to Christianity, though anti-clerical tendencies sometimes emerged, and some members advocated the creation of a national church independent of Vatican authority.

The PNS was anti-Marxist but expressed approval for certain policies of the Soviet Union under Joseph Stalin, hoping that the communist ideology could be “nationalized.” While critical of Fascism and Nazism as foreign models, it acknowledged the antisemitism of those regimes with approval and, at times, expressed understanding for the revisionist aims of governments of that type.

== See also ==
- National Workers' Party
- National Socialism (disambiguation)
- Left-wing nationalism

== Bibliography ==
- J. Tomasiewicz: Towards a Natiocracy. Authoritarian, totalistic and pro-fascist tendencies in Polish political thought (1933–1939): nationalists – national radicals – national socialists. University of Silesia Press, Katowice, 2019.
