= National-Socialist Commune =

Political party in Poland (1888–1893)

National-Socialist Commune Gmina Narodowo-Socjalistyczna
- Abbreviation: GN-S
- Founder: Stanisław Barański
- Founded: 1888
- Dissolved: 1893
- Preceded by: Lud Polski
- Merged into: Polish Socialist Party
- Headquarters: Paris
- Membership: Liga Polska (1889–1891)
- Ideology: Revolutionary socialism Polish nationalism
- Political position: Left-wing to Far-left
- Slogan: "Freedom, Equality, Independence" (Wolność, Równość, Niepodległość)

National-Socialist Commune (Polish: Gmina Narodowo-Socjalistyczna) was a Polish socialist-revolutionary and nationalist organization founded by exiles in Paris in 1888. It remained active until 1893.

== History ==
The National-Socialist Commune was founded in 1888 by Stanisław Barański. Barański brought together young Poles—primarily medical students in Paris—along with members and supporters of the pre-existing socialist organizations Równość and Lud Polski.

The organization adopted a red flag featuring an eagle and the motto "Freedom, Equality, Independence."

The official publication of the National-Socialist Commune was Pobudka, a monthly journal published in Paris and edited by Barański. Initially, he was assisted by Antoni Złotnicki, followed by Jan Lorentowicz. From the first issue, Bolesław Limanowski contributed articles to the magazine.

Other authors who published under pseudonyms in Pobudka included Marian Abramowicz, Władysław Grabski, Jan Wacław Machajski, Tadeusz Jaroszyński, Antoni Lange, Maria Sulicka, Maria Szeliga, Gabriela Zapolska, and Jan Lucjan Tolkemit.

In January 1889, the National-Socialist Commune published its program in Pobudka:

Poland seeks two things: to recover independence as the only guarantee of national liberties, given the existence and prosperity of the Polish nation threatened by the invasion, and a radical revolution of the prevailing socio-economic relations based on free leasing and private property, which it must be replaced by one based on the principles of economic equality, political freedom and national independence.

— Program of the National-Socialist Commune

The National-Socialist Commune advocated for the nationalization of land, real estate, and the means of production, as well as universal suffrage for all citizens, regardless of ethnicity, gender, or religion. They emphasized that Poland’s independence and social issues were inseparable and could not be addressed in isolation.

The organization aimed to initiate a "political revolution" to achieve Polish independence, which would then transition peacefully toward socialism. It sought to build its foundation among the "cultured proletariat."

The National-Socialist Commune regarded all parties advocating for political freedom and the expansion of social equality as allies—provided they did not obstruct its efforts with moderate or reformist aspirations. While the organization was openly influenced by Marxism, its primary ideological reference was Bolesław Limanowski.

Prioritizing an understanding of Polish realities, political structures, and social relations, the National-Socialist Commune first sought an independent path to socialism before embracing an internationalist vision.

Beginning in January 1889, the National-Socialist Commune, while maintaining its political and ideological autonomy, aligned with the Liga Polska under a special agreement, recognizing it as the supreme national revolutionary institution.

At that time, the commissar of Liga Polska in Paris was Henryk Gierszyński, who had previously collaborated with the National-Socialist Commune. As ideological disputes within Liga Polska intensified, activists from the Commune became increasingly vocal in advocating for the creation of a national liberation party that was both openly and radically socialist.

This shift coincided with Gierszyński being succeeded by Bolesław Motz, an activist from Zet, who began fiercely competing with the National-Socialist Commune for influence among Polish youth in Paris.

Starting in 1891, Pobudka, led by Jan Lorentowicz following Barański’s death, became particularly active in promoting the Commune’s vision for an independent socialist party.

From 17 to 23 November 1892, delegates from the National-Socialist Commune participated in the Paris Congress, which led to the establishment of the Foreign Union of Polish Socialists (ZZPS). This congress is considered the founding congress of the Polish Socialist Party (PPS). Following the congress, the Paris branch of the ZZPS was formed, building upon the foundations of the National-Socialist Commune.
