= Ray Hill (British activist) =

British activist (1939–2022)

Raymond Hill
- Born: 2 December 1939; Mossley, England
- Died: 14 May 2022 (aged 82)
- Education: Stamford Secondary School, Ashton-under-Lyne
- Occupation: Gold miner
- Known for: Far-right activist turned mole
- Notable work: The Other Face of Terror: Inside Europe's Neo-Nazi Network (1988)
- Title: Deputy leader of the British Movement
- Term: 1980–1982
- Political party: British Movement; South African National Front; British National Party
- Movement: Racial Preservation Society
- Spouse: Glennis Hill
- Children: 3

Raymond Hill (2 December 1939 – 14 May 2022) was a leading figure in the British far right who went on to become a well-known informant. A sometime deputy leader of the British Movement and a founder member of the British National Party, Hill also secretly worked for Searchlight magazine by feeding information about the groups' activities.

== Early years ==
Born in Mossley, Lancashire, Hill was educated at the local Church of England primary school and at Stamford Secondary School in Ashton-under-Lyne. He spent three years in the army in the 1950s. He moved to Leicester in 1965 where he met Glennis and they were married in June 1966. Their first child was born a year later in 1967.

== British Movement ==
Hill made his first steps in the far right in the latter 1960s with a local group called the Anti-Immigration Society (AIMS), promptly switching to the larger Racial Preservation Society to which AIMS was closely linked. From there he met Colin Jordan and soon became a member of the British Movement, being appointed Organiser for Leicester in 1968 as well as Jordan's election agent for his campaign in the 1969 Birmingham Ladywood by-election. Although his wife largely tolerated his political involvement, Hill's arrest for actual bodily harm in late 1969 led to his disengagement and the couple deciding to emigrate.

== South Africa ==
Hill emigrated to South Africa the following year, and became disabused of his former views after becoming friendly with members of South Africa's Jewish community. He was asked by a friend to infiltrate the South African National Front, an organisation for ex-pat whites, eventually rising to the chairmanship as well as undertaking a series of speaking engagements for the Afrikaans Herstigte Nasionale Party (a radical breakaway from the ruling National Party).

== Return to Britain ==
Hill returned to Leicester in 1980 where he became associated with Anthony Reed Herbert, initially in the National Front, then in the British Democratic Party. Hill did not actually join either group; instead, he renewed his membership in the British Movement. Around this time Hill also began to work in secret for Searchlight, helping to foil an alleged gun-running plot by the BDP. Hill's presence as a double agent in the BM also ensured that their activities were disrupted and that they were subject to several police investigations regarding allegations of planned violence.

By then deputy leader of the BM, Hill clashed with leader Michael McLaughlin in 1982 and succeeded in splitting the party. Hill, a former boxer in the army with a reputation as a street fighter, had the support of the BM's large skinhead following and took them with him when he joined the newly launched British National Party in 1982 (also convincing Reed Herbert to bring his BDP on board). Indeed, Hill claimed that he had contacted BNP leader John Tyndall, at the time leading a group called the New National Front (NNF), as early as 1981 to discuss forming a new united party. Hill contended that he hoped to bring disparate far-right groups together to sabotage their activity and that ultimately he hoped to challenge Tyndall for the leadership and fight a dirty and highly divisive campaign to increase the sabotage. Hill's activities on behalf of the BNP included a June 1982 attempted takeover of the BBC radio show Any Questions?, in which he and some supporters disrupted a broadcast by shouting pro-BNP slogans from the audience. At the 1983 general election he contested Leicester West for the BNP, receiving 469 votes (1.0%).

== Revealed as a mole ==
Hill revealed himself to be a "mole" in 1984 in a documentary for Channel 4 which focused on the links between the British far right and international terrorism, as well as plots to launch bomb attacks in London, said to have been planned by the National Socialist Action Party. Column 88 and the League of St. George were also heavily implicated in Hill's claims. As well as the British far-right, Hill's revelations also included claims about terrorist involvement of their French counterparts and Fédération d'action nationale et européenne leader Mark Fredriksen. Hill's revelations sent shockwaves through the British far-right and encouraged a culture of suspicion. Indeed, soon afterwards when Joe Pearce approached Tyndall about bringing the Young National Front en bloc to the BNP, Tyndall rejected his overtures for fear that Pearce might also be a "mole".

== Subsequent activity ==
Hill became a regular columnist for Searchlight from then on, and in 1988 published a book about his experiences, The Other Face of Terror, with the journalist Andrew Bell. Called as a witness before the European Parliament's Commission on Racism and Xenophobia, Hill's evidence included the claim that within the neo-Nazi underground a system of "brown aid" existed for fugitives and those defined by the movement as political prisoners. He contended that he personally had been involved in "safehousing" several far-right Italian fugitives during his political involvement.

Hill was also elected as an Honorary Vice-President of the National Union of Students due to subsequent work he undertook with students.

Hill died on 14 May 2022, at the age of 82. In an obituary, Searchlight magazine described their former colleague as "that giant of the anti-fascist movement".

== Elections contested ==
Date of election	Constituency	Party	Votes	%
1983	Leicester West	BNP	469	1.0

== Bibliography ==
- R. Hill & A. Bell, The Other Face of Terror- Inside Europe's Neo-Nazi Network, London: Collins, 1988.
