= National Socialist Party of Tripura =

Tripuri nationalist political party in India

- Founder: Hiren Tripura
- Founded: 2003
- Headquarters: Tripura
- Ideology: Tripuri nationalism

National Socialist Party of Tripura is a political party in the Indian state of Tripura. NSPT was formed when Hirendra Tripura and others broke away from the Indigenous Nationalist Party of Tripura in the summer of 2003. One of the principal leaders of INPT, Shyamcharan Tripura, took the side of NSPT. With the help of the Communist Party of India (Marxist) members in the Tripura Tribal Areas Autonomous District Council (TTAADC), the NSPT were quickly able to win control of the TTAADC.

In the 2005 elections to the TTAADC, the NSPT contested four seats, supported by the Left Front. All four candidates were elected.

In spite of the name, the party has no connection with Nazism or any other European use of the term "National Socialism".

== See also ==
- Tripuri nationalism
- Tripura rebellion
