= Bolesław Limanowski =

Polish socialist politician (1835–1935)

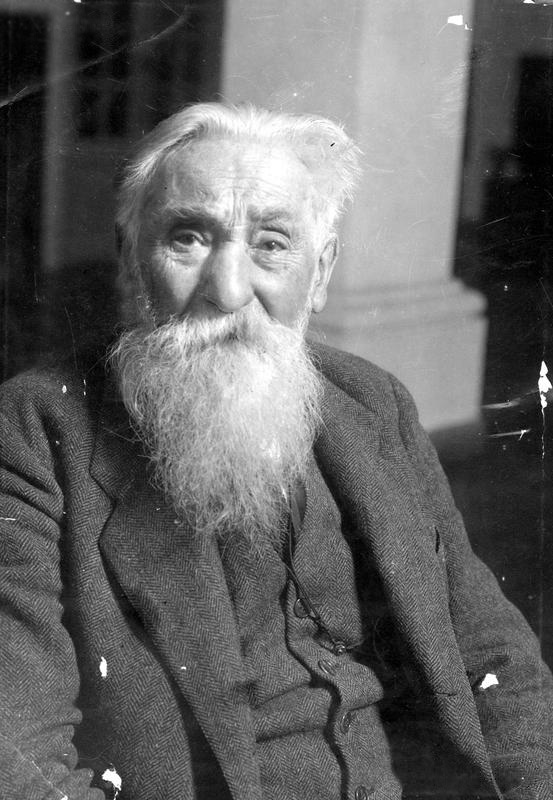
- Bolesław Limanowski in 1924

Member of the Polish Senate
- In office 1922–1935

Personal details
- Born: 18 October 1835 Podgórze, Vitebsk Governorate (now Braslaw District, Belarus)
- Died: 15 February 1935 (aged 99) Warsaw, Poland
- Party: Polish Socialist Party
- Occupation: Historian, politician
- Awards

Bolesław Limanowski (Polish pronunciation: [bɔˈlɛswaf limaˈnɔfskʲi]; 18 October 1835 – 15 February 1935) was a Polish socialist politician, as well as historian and journalist and advocate of Agrarianism. He was one of the first people to promote socialist ideas in Poland.

== Political activism ==
He began to be politically active during his studies in Wilno and was arrested by Russian police in 1861 for expressing patriotic views. He was still in prison, when the January Uprising began in 1863, so he couldn't take part in the fighting. Released from prison in 1867, he moved to Lviv, where he was working as a journalist, expressing socialist views and became the secretary to Rudolf Günsberg, Professor of Applied Chemistry for one year. In 1878 he emigrated to Switzerland, where he was publishing, together with Stanisław Mendelson, Kazimierz Dłuski and Kazimierz Hildt, one of the first Polish socialist newspaper, "Równość" (Equality). He was a founder of Stowarzyszenie Socjalistyczne Lud Polski (Socialist Association "Polish People"), which goal was fighting for independence of Poland and socialism. His views were supported by Friedrich Engels himself, who opted for Polish independence (but changed his mind afterwards), and with whom Limanowski was in contact.

In November 1892 he took part in a meeting of Polish socialists from the Russian partition held in Paris. As the oldest participant, he became a chairman of the talks. He became one of the founding members of the Polish Socialist Party (PPS) established there. After the division of the Party, he supported Polish Socialist Party – Revolutionary Faction, led by Józef Piłsudski. Limanowski was a proponent of the Polish nation and never accepted internationalism of the radical left-wing organizations and communists.

== Senator of independent Poland ==
He was present in Poland during the difficult first years of independence. In 1922 he was elected a senator for the first time. After Piłsudski's coup in 1926, Limanowski strongly advocated democracy and opposed the Sanacja authoritarian government. Despite his age, he remained active and was serving as a senator until his death at the age of 99.

== Political thought ==
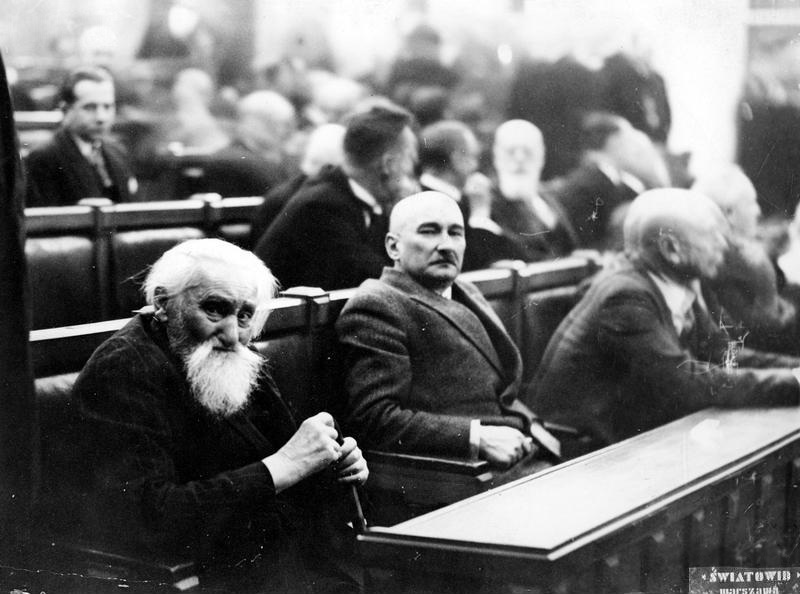
Limanowski (left) in the Senate

Bolesław Limanowski was the first Polish socialist writer and political thinker. In his works, he always expressed that the main goal of every Polish political party is to regain independence. He saw a strong connection between a struggle for nation sovereignty and social reforms. As a historian, he focused his attention especially on Poland during and after the times of partitions – national uprisings, revolutions and development of modern political thought and political parties. For his achievements on that field, he was awarded the title of doctor honoris causa of the University of Warsaw in 1934.

== Agrarianism ==
Though not his party's official spokesman on agrarian matters, he thought deeply about Agrarianism and worked out an eclectic program that fit Polish conditions. His practical experience as a farm manager combined with socialist, "single-tax," and Slavic communal ideas shaped his world view. He proposed a form of agrarian socialism with large state farms to counteract the inefficiency of very small holdings. In independent Poland he advocated expropriation of gentry estates. His observation of with peasant individualism convinced him that Poland should combine voluntary collectivism and individual possession of the leased land. His pragmatism left room even for private peasant ownership, despite his Marxism.

== Works ==
- O kwestii robotniczej (On Workers' Issue) (1871)
- Historia demokracji polskiej w epoce porozbiorowej (The history of Polish democracy in the after-partitions period) (1901)
- Demokracja w Polsce (Democracy in Poland) (1903)
- Emilia Plater (1910)
- Studwudziestoletnia walka narodu polskiego o niepodległość (The 120 Years Fight of the Polish Nation for Independence) (1916)
- Rozwój polskiej myśli socjalistycznej (Progress of Polish Socialist Thought) (1929)
- Pamiętniki (Memoirs) (1961)
