= Robert Relf =

British far right activist (1924–2014)

Robert Edward Relf
- Born: 1924
- Died: October 12, 2014
- Occupation: Political activist
- Known for: Far-right activism, 1976 housing controversy
- Notable work: Founder of White Power Movement
- Criminal charges: Inciting racial hatred, contempt of court
- Criminal penalty: Multiple prison sentences

Robert Edward Relf (1924 – 12 October 2014) was an English political activist of the far right. Regarded by his sympathisers as a 'race martyr', he briefly became a cause célèbre for the tabloid press in the 1970s.

== Early years ==
Relf spent most of his working life as a bus driver although he also had a spell as a paratrooper. He was involved in far-right activity in the Midlands during the 1960s and was arrested in 1965 as a suspect in a cross burning incident. Following this incident he was invited onto Midlands Today to present his point of view, an appearance widely condemned by anti-racist campaigners in the region. That same year, Relf and seven other members of a British version of the Ku Klux Klan were found guilty of wearing a uniforms, or aiding and abetting the wearing of such uniforms at a public meeting signifying association with a political organization, under the Public Order Act 1936. Five of those convicted received fines, while the other three, including Relf, were each sentenced to three months in prison.

== House sale controversy and aftermath ==
Relf first came to national attention in 1976 when he advertised his house in Leamington Spa as being 'For Sale - to an English family only'. The sign had initially read "Viewing. To avoid animosity all round positively no coloureds" before Relf amended it. Relf was found to be in breach of the Race Relations Act and was jailed for contempt of court when he refused to take it down. Relf's plight was taken up by the tabloid press as an example of the supposedly draconian nature of race legislation and there was an outcry that Relf was imprisoned for his actions.

Demonstrations were held, particularly in the Midlands, demanding his release, although counter-demonstrations endorsing the sentence were also organised. One such event in Handsworth ended in a riot with 28 arrests as National Front and anti-fascist demonstrators clashed when their respective marches met. However, fervour for Relf's cause soon died after articles about his background began to appear in the Sunday Times, revealing that Relf had been a member of the British Movement and had served as a bodyguard to Colin Jordan as well as attempting to organise a UK branch of the Ku Klux Klan.

Relf, who staged a hunger strike during his incarceration, was released from prison the same year, although by now much of the popular support that he had gathered had died away. He would go on to rejoin the British Movement, although he left due to his dissatisfaction with the leadership of Michael McLaughlin and instead devoted much of his energies to the World Union of National Socialists, at the time led by Povl Riis-Knudsen. He also been associated with the National Front and it became his main area of domestic activity after he left the BM (although he had also been courted by the National Party who, along with the NF and BM, played a leading role in the campaign for his release).

Having gained notoriety Relf continued to perform publicity stunts, notably in September 1978 when he was handed a £10 fine for refusing to wear a motorcycle helmet in protest at the legal exemption from the requirement for Sikhs. After refusing to pay the fine, Relf was jailed for six days. In 1979, Relf received a 15-month sentence for publishing racial hatred materials and inciting racial hatred, and immediately went on hunger strike, sparking another NF led campaign for his release. He helped to set up White Nationalist Crusade, an attempt to create an umbrella movement for the far right in Britain, although this proved unsuccessful and he briefly led his own White Power Movement the following year.

== Later years ==
Relf largely disappeared from public life until 1991 when he again became involved in controversy, this time over a letter sent to the Conservative Party in Cheltenham. In the letter Relf attacked local Tories for their decision to endorse John Taylor, a black man who would later be appointed a life peer in the House of Lords, as their candidate for the 1992 general election. Relf suggested that those who had chosen Taylor should be 'strung up' because Taylor wanted 'a nation of half breeds'. Taylor failed to win the traditionally Conservative seat of Cheltenham in the 1992 election, losing to Nigel Jones of the Liberal Democrats.

In 2002 Relf was fined £100 after refusing to complete a census form because he was not happy to indicate his nationality as "British", preferring "English". After he refused to pay the fine, Relf was sentenced to a week in jail. Later that same year he was fined for sending postcards to Warwick police station which were deemed to be offensive . Relf had sent the cards after reading a story that the local police had removed a poster promoting a Saint George's Day event.
