= Deutsche Vereinigung =

German Union
- Deutsche Vereinigung
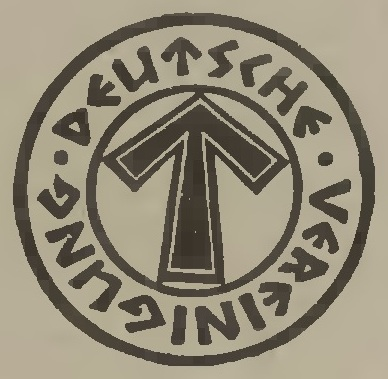

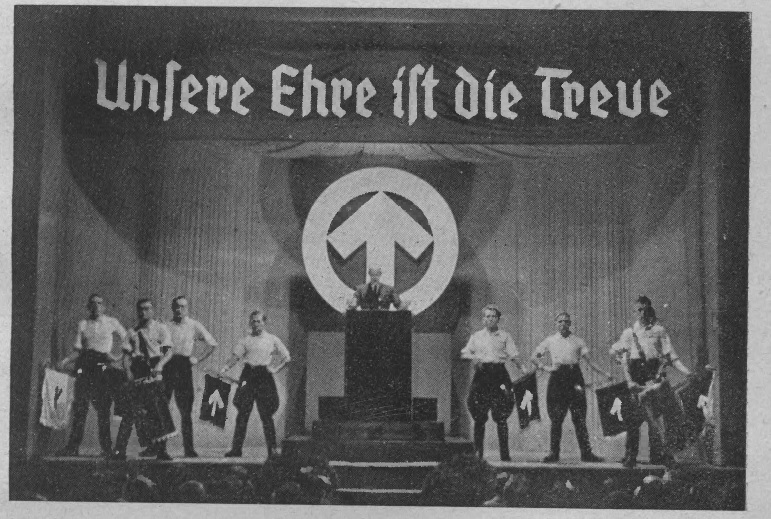
- Meeting of Deutsche Vereinigung in Bydgoszcz (September 10, 1938)
- Established: September 8, 1934
- Dissolved: January 21, 1940
- Type: Nazi Party
- Headquarters: Bydgoszcz, Poland
- Leader: Oberführer Hans Kohnert
- Affiliations: Third Reich
- Remarks: Far-right politics

Deutsche Vereinigung (DV), or the German Union (Polish: Zjednoczenie Niemieckie), was a Nazi German extreme right-wing political party founded in 1934 by members of the ethnic German minority residing in the Second Polish Republic.

== History ==
The organization was established on September 8, 1934, in Bydgoszcz after solving the "German Union in Sejm and Senate". The organization included German minority organizations from northern Poland, such as the "Block of Unity" operating in Poznań, "Young German Block" from Grudziądz and the "German Central Election Commission" operating in Pomerania. Within 1,5 year, 150 branches were established, and by May 1934, the DV already had 16,474 members. At the turn of 1935/36, the number of members increased to 27,804. In the spring of 1939, the DV had about 35,000 members in the provinces of Poznań and Pomerania, which made it the second largest organization of the German minority in Poland. Organizationally, the DV, like other German organizations in pre-war Poland, was subject to the Hauptamt Volksdeutsche Mittelstelle, headed by Obergruppenführer Werner Lorenz. DV published three newspapers, "Deutsche Rundschau in Polen" (Bydgoszcz), "Posener Tageblatt" (Poznań) and "Pommereller Tageblatt" (Tczew), which met primarily the goals of agitation. The German Union competed with another organization of the German minority in Poland - the Jungdeutsche Partei. On January 21, 1940, the German Union was dissolved.

== Bloody Sunday ==
On September 4, 1939, during the Bydgoszcz bloody Sunday, German saboteurs in the village of Prądy (Bydgoszcz County) fired on withdrawing units of the Polish 15th Infantry Division, in retaliation, 15 Germans were shot (including Ferdinand Dreger, Gustav Dreger, Gustav Rudolf Kopiske, Ferdinand Giese).

== Uniforms and symbols ==
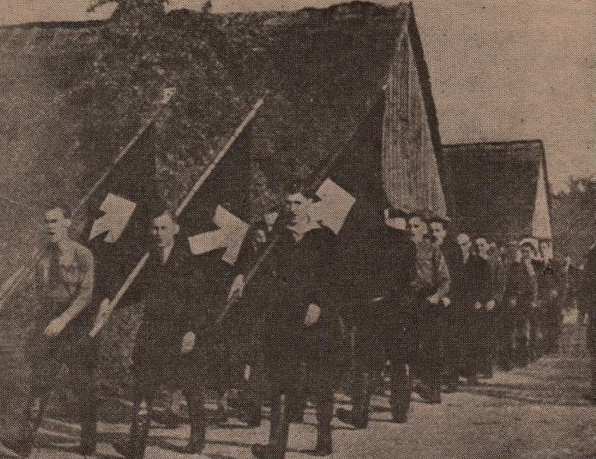
Members of Deutsche Vereinigung in May 1939 in Prądy

During the meetings the members of DV wore a uniform outfit consisting of black pants or a skirt, a white shirt and a black tie. Wearing these clothes in public places was forbidden and resulted in a fine for the infringement. The DV sign was a white arrow on the black background - the Tiwaz.

== See also ==
- Deutscher Volksverband, the German minority organization from central Poland
- Jungdeutsche Partei, the German minority organization operating throughout Poland
