= Russian National Union =

Russian neo-Nazi party (1993–1999)

Russian National Union Ру́сский Национа́льный Сою́з
- Founder: Konstantin Kassimovsky; Aleksei Vdovin
- Founded: 1993
- Dissolved: 1999
- Split from: Pamyat
- Merged into: Russian National Socialist Party
- Newspaper: Shturmovhik
- Ideology: Neo-Nazism
- Political position: Far-right
- International affiliation: NSDAP/AO

Party flag

The Russian National Union (Russian: Ру́сский Национа́льный Сою́з, romanized: Russky Natsionalny Soyuz) was a Neo-Nazi political party in Russia.

== Formation ==
The Russian National Union was first formed in 1993 as a hardline splinter group of the nationalist Pamyat organisation. Based in Moscow, the party was jointly led by Konstantin Kassimovsky and Aleksei Vdovin. The new group was supported by Aleksandr Shtilmark and his influential far right journal Chernaya sotnya (Black Hundreds), Shtilmark having quit Pamyat in 1992.

The party adopted its own flag, which it claimed represented the letters chi and rho in the Greek alphabet, although critics have argued that it is a deliberate attempt to recall the swastika, including in its use of the Nazi colours of red, white and black. Members of the party have carried swastika flag at far right rallies however.

== Ideology ==
=== Nazism ===
The RNU became noted for its neo-Nazism and it attracted a strong current of White power skinhead support, helping to co-ordinate the activities of skinhead gangs by the mid-1990s. It stressed strong ethnocentrism and racism as part of its political discourse. RNU also formed alliances with like-minded groups elsewhere, particularly in western Europe.

It produced its own newspaper, Shturmovhik, which became noted for the strong anti-Semitism which defined its content. Named for a Nazi Party publication Der Stürmer this paper, and its sister magazine Natsiia (Nation) were noted for their heavy reliance on German Nazism. The pages of Shturmovhik also contained regular attacks on Black and Caucasian immigrants. Another newspaper, Russky nablyudatel (Russian Observer), began publication in 1995 under the editorship of R. Lobzova.

=== Orthodoxy ===
As well as Nazism the RNU emphasised the importance of Russian Orthodoxy to its ideology and saw the religion as a central part of its concept of Russian ethnic identity. Amongst the leading members of the party was Anatolii Makeev, who sought to connect the party's neo-Nazi ideas with a distinctly more Russian brand of nationalism. In 1994 he established the Oprichnina Brotherhood of St Iosof Volotsky, a group that has encouraged violent racism in religious terms and which has established groups in Saint Petersburg and Volgograd, as well as amongst émigrés in Sacramento. Its stated aims are to unite the Orthodox Church and to re-establish the monarchy, although its propaganda focuses mainly on anti-Semitism and neo-Nazism. Makeev is a member of the Russian Catacomb Church, an offshoot of the Russian True Orthodox Church, although his brotherhood retains links to members of both the dissident tendencies and mainstream Russian Orthodox Church. Another extremist Orthodox group, the Soyuz 'Khristianskoe vozrozhdenie' (Union of Christian Rebirth), also held joint meetings with the RNU.

== Development ==
The party failed to secure the requisite number of signatures to run candidates in the 1993 Duma election and so did not take part. One candidate was elected as an independent however.

Vdovin was expelled from the RNU in spring 1997 with Kassimovsky confirmed as sole leader of the party. The party disappeared in late 1998 or early 1999 when Kassimovsky began to move away from the religious trappings associated with the RNU. He soon emerged with a new more secular, but equally neo-Nazi, party known as the Russian National Socialist Party.
