= Spanish Action Circle =

Falangist political organization in Chile

The Spanish Action Circle (Círculo de Acción Española) was a Falangist political organization in Chile associated with Francoist Spain.
