= Michael McLaughlin (activist) =

British neo-Nazi (born 1940)

2nd Leader of the British Movement
- In office 1975 – 1983 (8 years)
- Preceded by: Colin Jordan
- Succeeded by: Position abolished (succeeded by the British National Socialist Movement)

Personal details
- Born: Liverpool, England
- Occupation: Activist, blogger, writer

Michael McLaughlin, also known as Michael Walsh and Mike Walsh-McLaughlin, is a British neo-Nazi. Born in Liverpool, McLaughlin was the son of an Irish republican and socialist who was a veteran of the International Brigades.

According to his blog, his father was a good friend of Irish playwright Seán O'Casey, and shared battle experiences with war correspondent and international author, Ernest Hemingway. His mother corresponded with Dolores Ibárruri (La Pasionaria) during the Spanish Civil War.

== Background ==
Michael McLaughlin's father was Paddy Roe McLaughlin (Irish: Pádraig Ruadh Mac Lochlainn), who lived from 1902 to 1974 and was an Irish-speaker born in Lecamy on the Inishowen Peninsula, County Donegal. Patrick was a committed Irish republican and socialist fighting in four major conflicts. As a member of the Irish Republican Army, he fought in the Irish War of Independence and the Irish Civil War (on the anti-Treaty side). After spending time in the United States, he fought in Spain as part of the International Brigades with the Connolly Column of the Lincoln Battalion. Patrick McLaughlin married Kathleen Walsh of Liverpool in 1938 and was a founding member of the Connolly Association in England. During the Second World War he joined the Royal Air Force to fight against the Axis powers flying Spitfires and Hurricanes. The couple were both members of the Communist Party of Great Britain, though Kathleen left the party in 1956.

== British Movement ==
For a time McLaughlin worked as a milkman, and as a result he was known as "The Milkman" in right wing circles, where he was seen as a largely unassuming figure. His first involvement with politics came when he joined the British Movement in 1968. He became leader of the British Movement in 1975 when Colin Jordan abruptly resigned. Although initially seen as not being leadership material he soon gained publicity for the BM by leading the campaign to free Robert Relf, who, at the time, had considerable sympathy in sections of the press.

Moving the BM headquarters away from Jordan's base in Coventry to Shotton, Flintshire, he repositioned the BM as a party geared towards the young working classes and by 1979 had raised membership to around 3,000. McLaughlin was sentenced by judge David Wyn Morgan in 1979 to six four-month prison sentences for publishing leaflets dealing with the British government's foreign policy and immigration policies. The jail term did not affect his position as leader.

== Demise of the British Movement ==
McLaughlin's leadership came under fire from deputy leader Ray Hill, who commanded the respect of the BM's large racist skinhead following and who was also working in secret for the magazine Searchlight. Hill accused McLaughlin of spending all his time in Wales and using the BM for his personal enrichment, causing splits to develop in the group. McLaughlin eventually expelled Hill but was served with a writ by the deputy leader. McLaughlin was forced to use BM funds to fight the case whilst Hill was able to call upon the expertise of his close associate Anthony Reed Herbert.

McLaughlin attempted to change the name of the group to the British Nationalist & Socialist Movement in order to convince the courts that the BM no longer existed, but the move failed and the case continued until finally Hill left to join the British National Party in 1982, taking more than half of the membership with him. Devoid of much of its support and left in a precarious financial state, McLaughlin wound up the BM in 1983.

== Post-British Movement activity ==
McLaughlin ran a series of army surplus outlets, notably Rucksack n'Rifle in northern Wales, which specialised in survivalism, during the late 1980s. He produced an occasional broadsheet newspaper Comment on political themes, although this has not appeared since the mid-1980s.

== Later political writing ==
Sometime in the mid-2000s McLaughlin reappeared on the political scene using the name Michael Walsh-McLaughlin, which he then shortened to Michael Walsh.

As "Michael Walsh" (a pseudonym), McLaughlin set up a copywriting company called Michael Walsh Copywriting, based in Liverpool. Under that name, he began writing intensely pro-Nazi and pro-Hitler articles for long-time neo-Nazi American activist Gerhard Lauck on the latter's website under the topic-heading United Kingdom News Desk by Michael Walsh.

McLaughlin/Walsh writes an irregular column on the website of the Historical Review Press in Sussex, under the title "Contemporary Comments from the News Desk of Michael Walsh".

He has contributed columns to Euro Weekly News, and was the only Euro writer to receive the Writer of the Year Gala Award accolade (in 2011).

Walsh has been interviewed 17 times on the Deanna Spingola radio show, Spingola Speaks (Republican Broadcasting Network), since 2011. Spingola hosts a page dedicated to his writings.

McLaughlin/Walsh now lives in Spain where he operates a blog called European Renaissance.

== Written works ==
Since 1984, Walsh has authored a total of eighteen book titles.

- All I Ask Is A Tall Ship
- Heart to Heart Poetry, volume 1
- Heart to Heart Poetry, volume 2
- Heart to Heart Poetry, volume 3
- The Fifth Column, volume 1
- The Fifth Column, volume 2
- Witness to History: When the Blindfold Drops the Penny Does Too, Historical Review Press; New edition, January 1996
- The Triumph of Reason: The Thinking Man's Guide to Adolf Hitler, Historical Review Press, 20 November 2002
- The Battle for Europe: Hidden Truths about the Second World War Paperback, 11 December 2013
- Heroes of the Reich, Volume One, 19 January 2015
- Heroes Hang when Traitors Triumph: Were Sinners Really Saints, 27 January 2015
- Europe Arise: Europe in Flames Cause and Solution, 28 October 2015
- The Rise of the Sun Wheel: British White Rights Dissident Tells All, 5 May 2016

== Bibliography ==
- R. Hill & A. Bell, The Other Face of Terror- Inside Europe’s Neo-Nazi Network, London: Collins, 1988
