= Charles Luca =

French politician

Charles Luca (born Charles Gastaut) was the founder of the Phalange Française (French for French Falange). Luca was the nephew of the wife of French fascist leader Marcel Déat.
