= Konstantin Kasimovsky =

Russian neo-Nazi (born 1974)

Konstantin Rodionovich Kasimovsky (Russian: Константин Родионович Касимовский; born May 26, 1974, in Moscow) is a Russian neo-Nazi. Formerly a member of Pamyat, he has led two parties of his own, the Russian National Union and the Russian National Socialist Party, as well as a less well-defined group known as Russian Action. It is claimed that he split from Pamyat and became convinced of Nazism after a 1992 visit to Transnistria.

He initially shared leadership of the RNU with Aleksei Vdovin but took sole charge in 1997 when Vdovin was expelled (before going on to join Russian National Unity). He has also been a close associate of Alexander Prokhanov and with him invited David Duke to Russia in 1999.

Kasimovsky has claimed that history has been defined by a constant struggle against decline and has argued that this struggle has been led by various 'orders' such as the Knights of the Round Table, the Oprichnik movement and the SS and has sought to build his movement in the same model. In his ideas he has been influenced by Ariosophy and is close to the Neopagan Society of Nav.
