= German People's Union in Poland =

German People's Union in Poland Deutscher Volksverband in Polen (German) Niemieckie Stowarzyszenie Ludowe w Polsce (Polish)
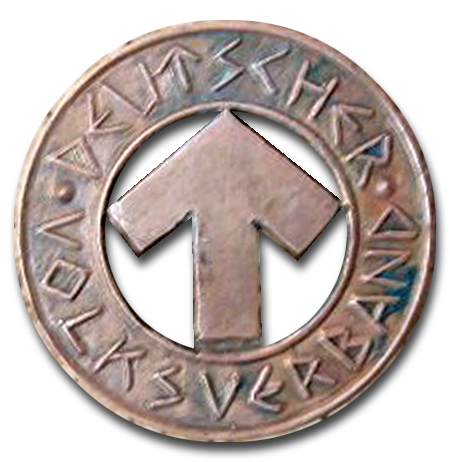
- Leader: August Utta
- Founded: 1924
- Headquarters: Łódź, Poland
- Ideology: Nazism
- Political position: Far-right
- International affiliation: Nazi Germany

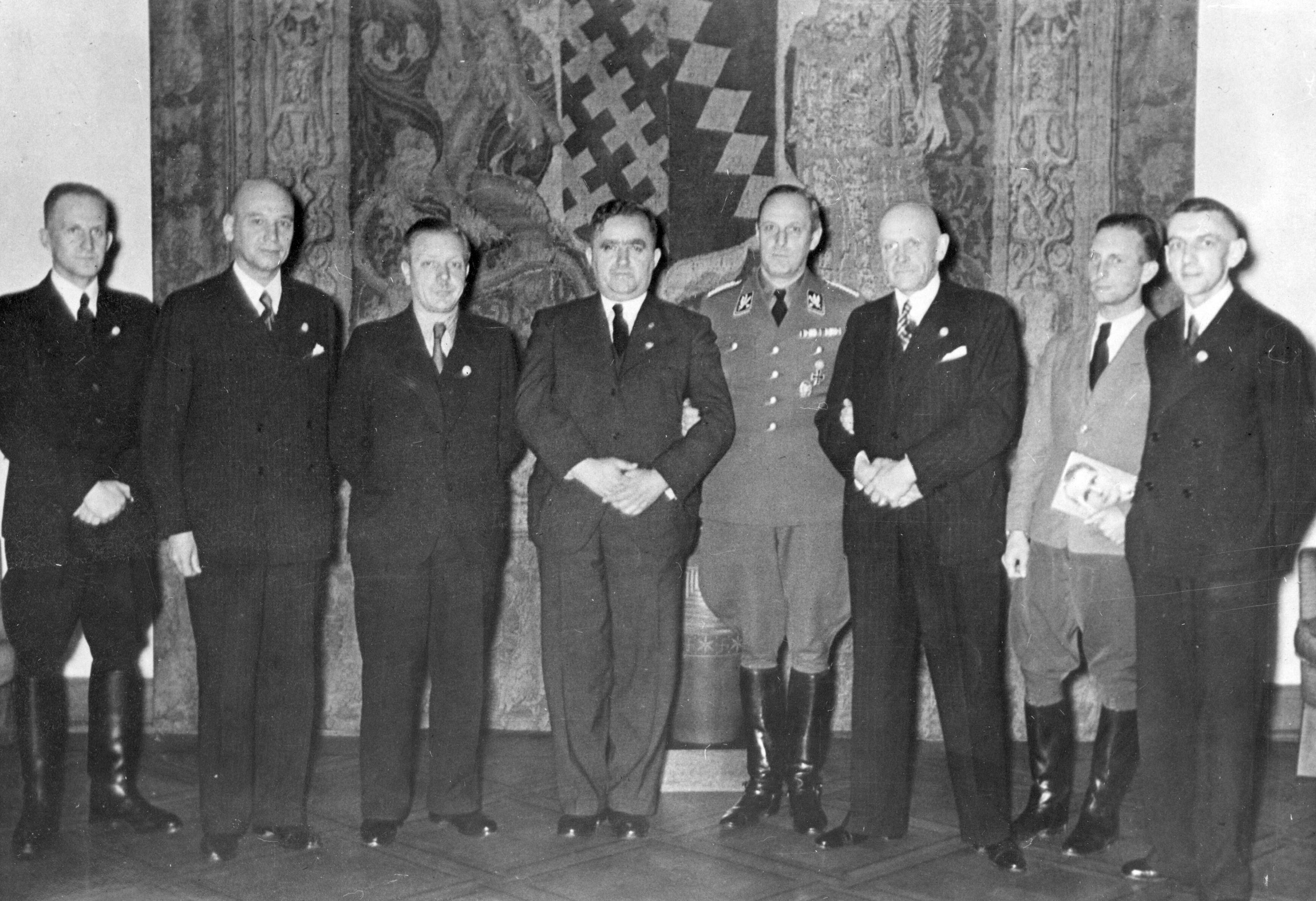
Volksdeutsches decorated Golden Party Badge by Adolf Hitler in Berlin after Invasion of Poland in 1939. From left: Ludwig Wolff head of Deutscher Volksverband from Łódź, Otto Ulitz from Katowice, gauleiter Josef Wagner, mayor Rudolf Wiesner from Bielsko-Biała, obergruppenfuhrer Werner Lorenz, senator Erwin Hasbach from Ciechocinek, baron Gero von Gersdorff from Wielkopolska, Weiss from Jarocin.

Deutscher Volksverband in Polen (DVV), or the German People's Union in Poland, was a Nazi German extreme right-wing political party founded in 1924 in central Poland by members of the ethnic German minority who did not wish to join the minority bloc in the Polish parliament Sejm. DVV was headed by August Utta, and financially supported by the Reich Ministry of Finance. Deutscher Volksverband was most active in the Łódź and Tomaszów area.

The German Foreign Ministry aggressively supported the DVV Party through its own consulate in Poland for a number of reasons, one of them being the presence of the explicitly pro-Polish Deutscher Kultur– und Wirtschaftsbund (DKWB) organization in Łódź, which was critical of the revisionist Weimar government. DVV members denounced the "Lodzer Mensch" from the DKWB as puppets of the Polish government collaborating with the Jews and committing high treason against the German Reich. In 1935 August Utta was replaced by Ludwig Wolff, a committed Nazi.

== Operation ==
By the late 1930s, the whole of Poland was covered by ethnic German organizations supported financially by the Ministry of Foreign Affairs of the Third Reich. The Deutscher Volksverband (DVV) membership grew to over 25,000 participants in 1937. It was helped by emissaries arriving in Poland from Germany and commanded by Abwehr, with the aim of establishing the so-called 5th column among the Volksdeutsche, as well as any willing colonists, including the Mennonites. By 1938, all local structures of the DVV were formed. Many members of the DVV became German partisans during the 1939 invasion of Poland according to research. They were treated as an integral part of the German foreign policy towards the Polish state.

Just before the outbreak of war, in the Powiśle neighbourhood of Warsaw, a massive propaganda campaign was carried out by the members of Deutscher Volksverband directed by German agent Aleks Nipie, trying to convince young Poles to join the Wehrmacht. The DVV community leaders were asked to register people into the Deutsche Volksliste without proof of origin; all that they needed was a declaration, confirmed by a witness. The action was most successful among peasants, as educated Polish Germans did not want to be affiliated with Adolf Hitler. The new Volksdeutsche were trained to guide the Luftwaffe aircraft towards a desired target with mirrors. In Inowrocław, an ethnic German was spotted fastening big mirrors to a chimney on a roof of his dog pound. In the city of Toruń for example, during the first days of war about a dozen people were arrested and executed for signalling German reconnaissance planes with mirrors and flags. The courses in sabotage were conducted with the promise of receiving property in Poland (as in Gliwice), but also in Wrocław, Bielsko, Katowice, Zabrze and Rybnik. It is estimated that up to 20,000 ethnic Germans living in Poland belonged to organizations involved in sabotage actions, including Deutscher Volksbund in Silesia, Deutscher Volksverbarid in Łódź area, Deutsche Vereinigung in Pomerania and Jungdeutsche Partei across the entire country.

== See also ==
- Volksdeutscher Selbstschutz, Nazi storm brigade in World War II consisting of members of the German minority in Poland
