= National Socialist Irish Workers Party =

Defunct Irish political party

- Abbreviation: NSIWP
- Leader: Terence Allan-Byrne
- Founded: 1968
- Dissolved: late 1980s
- Headquarters: 6 Brendan's Cottages, Irishtown, Dublin; 69 Eugene Street, The Coombe
- Newspaper: Phoenix
- Ideology: Neo-Nazism
- Political position: Far-right
- International affiliation: World Union of National Socialists

The National Socialist Irish Workers Party (NSIWP) was a minor Neo-Nazi party in Ireland, founded in 1968.

== History ==
The NSIWP was founded in 1968 by Terence Allan-Byrne in Irishtown, Dublin. Among its members was Jos Mussche, a former member of the Dutch SS. Its newsletter was called Phoenix. The party had close links to the National Socialist British Workers Party, and was affiliated to the World Union of National Socialists.

In 1979, Byrne had a swastika carved into his chest; he refused to allow an Indian doctor treat it and was referred to another hospital, where a different doctor refused to treat him and ‘remarked that the wounds he was receiving were costing the tax-payers a lot of money’.

The NSIWP sought to recruit UNIFIL veterans "who had witnessed at first hand the devastation caused by Israeli power".

The NSIWP only ever had a handful of members and never contested any elections; however, it was important in producing of Nazi paraphernalia for the European and British movement, as, unlike most European countries, Ireland had no law like the British Race Relations Acts that forbade production or sale of neo-Nazi material. They also sent threatening letters to Irish Jews and Black people living in Ireland. Tomás Mac Giolla (Workers' Party, a socialist party), Tony Gregory (an independent left-wing TD) and Alan Shatter (a Jewish Fine Gael TD) raised the matter in Dáil Éireann in 1985; the Prohibition of Incitement To Hatred Act, 1989 made the production of such items illegal.

Republican socialists and other anti-fascists occasionally fought with NSIWP members. "Commander" Byrne died in the early 1980s, and the party ceased to exist by the late 1980s. Colm Tarrant, secretary of the NSIWP, later went on to work with the Irish–Arab Society, an anti-Israel organisation.
