= List of fascist movements by country =

This is a list of political parties, organizations, and movements that are widely regarded as fascist. Although many figureheads of such movements reject the label of fascism, scholars and observers often identify fascist characteristics based on ideology, behavior, and historical context. Because fascism is an ideological framework rather than a formally declared affiliation, its classification can be contested—particularly when leaders do not explicitly identify their movements as fascist.

To accommodate length and improve readability, the complete list of fascist parties, organizations, and movements—including those that have not held power or served as governing bodies—has been divided into four sections:

- List of fascist movements by country A–F
- List of fascist movements by country G–M
- List of fascist movements by country N–T
- List of fascist movements by country U–Z

== Fascist governing bodies ==
The following parties, organizations, movements, and figureheads are widely regarded as fascist and have held, or currently hold, power:

Country	Administration	Party, movement, and/or figurehead	From	To	Ref.
Italy *	Free State of Fiume	Italian Nationalist Association	1922	1923	
Italy *	Fascist Italy	National Fascist Party	1922	1943	
Italy *	Italian Social Republic	Republican Fascist Party	1943	1945	
San Marino	Most Serene Republic of San Marino	Sammarinese Fascist Party	1923	1943	
El Salvador	El Salvador	National Pro Patria Party	1931	1945	
Chile	Chile	National Socialist Movement of Chile	1932	1938	
China *	Manchukuo	Concordia Association	1932	1945	
China *	Reorganized National Government	Kuomintang (Wang Jingwei)	1940	1945	
Germany	German Reich	Nazi Party	1933	1945	
Austria	Federal State of Austria	Fatherland Front	1934	1938	
Poland *	Free City of Danzig	Arthur Greiser and Albert Maria Forster	1934	1939	
Poland *	General Government of Poland	Nazi Party	1939	1945	
Yugoslavia	Kingdom of Yugoslavia	Yugoslav Radical Union	1935	1939	
Yugoslavia	Government of National Salvation	Yugoslav National Movement	1941	1944	
Yugoslavia	Independent State of Croatia	Ustaša	1941	1945	
Yugoslavia	Governorate of Montenegro	Montenegrin Federalist Party	1941	1943	
Yugoslavia	German occupied Montenegro		1943	1944	
Yugoslavia	Independent State of Macedonia	Internal Macedonian Revolutionary Organization	1944	1944	
Spain *	Spanish State	FET y de las JONS	1936	1975	
Greece	Kingdom of Greece	4th of August Regime	1936	1941	
Greece	Hellenic State	Georgios Tsolakoglou, Konstantinos Logothetopoulos, and Ioannis Rallis	1941	1944	
Romania *	Kingdom of Romania	National Christian Party	1937	1938	
Romania *	National Legionary State of Romania	Iron Guard	1940	1941	
Romania *	Kingdom of Romania	Ion Antonescu	1941	1944	
Slovakia	Slovak Republic	Slovak People's Party	1939	1945	
Albania	Kingdom of Albania	Albanian Fascist Party	1939	1943	
Albania	German occupied Albania	Balli Kombëtar	1943	1944	
Czech Republic	Protectorate of Bohemia and Moravia	National Partnership	1939	1945	
Japan *	Empire of Japan	Taisei Yokusankai	1940	1945	
Netherlands	Netherlands	National Socialist Movement in the Netherlands (NSB)	1940	1944	
France *	Vichy France	Philippe Pétain	1940	1944	
Norway	National Government of Norway	Nasjonal Samling	1942	1945	
Philippines	Philippines	Kapisanan sa Paglilingkod sa Bagong Pilipinas (KALIBAPI)	1942	1944	
Monaco	Monaco		1942	1943	
Hungary	Government of National Unity of Hungary	Arrow Cross Party	1944	1945	
Myanmar	State Administration Council	Union Solidarity and Development Party	2021	2025	
Myanmar	National Defence and Security Council	Union Solidarity and Development Party	2025	present	

== Alliances ==
- Harzburg Front
- Tripartite Pact
- Anti-Comintern Pact
- Pact of Steel
- Rome Protocols
- Croatian–Romanian–Slovak friendship proclamation

== See also ==
- Alt-right
- Anti-Communism
- Anti-Sovietism
- Authoritarianism
- Definitions of fascism
- Ethnic nationalism
- Ethnocentrism
- Expansionism
- Extremism
- Far-right politics
- Far-right subcultures
- Fascism and ideology
- Identity politics
- Metaxism
- Nativism (politics)
- Nazism
- Neo-fascism
- Neo-Nazism
- Racial nationalism
- Racial supremacy
- Radical right (Europe)
- Radical right (United States)
- Right-wing politics
- Right-wing populism
- Right-wing terrorism
- Strasserism
- Totalitarianism
- Ultranationalism
- Xenophobia
