= Block FACT =

- Founded: Autumn 2010
- Founding location: Saint Petersburg, Russia
- Years active: 2010–present
- Territory: Russia, Ukraine
- Ethnicity: Ukrainians (core), Russians, Jews and Caucasians
- Activities: Assaults, battery, arsons, vandalism

Block FACT (Russian: Блок «Фаланга антикоммунистического тарана», lit. 'Block "Phalanx of Anti-Communist Ram"') is part of a Russian far-right group, operating in St. Petersburg and established in the autumn of 2010.

== Publicity ==
The public statements from Block FACT often represent hard anti-communism. The organization's criteria for labeling a group as communist are quite broad. For example, the regimes of Muammar Gaddafi, Bashar al-Assad, and even the Kingdom of Bahrain were labeled as "communist" by Block FACT.

== Activities ==
Block FACT claimed responsibility for the beating of St. Petersburg Stalinist historian Igor Pykhalov, setting fire to a Communist Party car (September 2011), and assaulting magistrate Alexei Kuznetsov (April 2013). Block FACT claimed responsibility for beating Communist Party secretary Alexey Rusakov (August 2012), burning a Communist Party car (February 2012), desecrating and destroying a series of Soviet memorials (plaques of Lenin, Uritsky, Romanov, Trefolev and Voytik), and attacking several activists of Communist organizations.

Some commentators characterized the actions of Block FACT as a relaxed variant of European neo-fascist terrorism of the 1970s. It is assumed that the activists of Block FACT attacked a former Duma deputy, Viktor Tyulkin. The leader of the St. Petersburg communist organizations, Tyulkin, was beaten on 4 October 2013, after a communist demonstration commemorating the 20th anniversary of the events of October 1993. One of the attackers congratulated Tyulkin with "happy holidays".

== See also ==
- Decommunization in Russia
- Decommunization (Russian political movement)
