= The Immortals (neo-Nazis) =

Neo-Nazi organization

The Immortals (German Die Unsterblichen) was a German neo-Nazi campaign that used flash mobs to demonstrate, while wearing black clothing with white facial masks and carrying torches.

== Origin ==
The torchlight marches of the Immortals originated from the Spreelichter, a right-wing extremist group in Brandenburg within the so-called resistance movement in southern Brandenburg, some of whose members were also active in the NPD youth organization Junge Nationaldemokraten. Their slogan was "Democrats are bringing us the extinction of the people." In a position paper, they wrote: "It's about propaganda – propaganda that clearly identifies and names the system as the reason our people are heading towards their death." They were banned in June 2012.

The group first appeared in 2006 in Lübbenau. Early appearances also took place in Bautzen, Altenburg, Frohburg, and Kohren-Sahlis, near the manor house that neo-Nazi Karl-Heinz Hoffmann operated as a right-wing extremist educational center.

== Appearance ==
The far-right activists would shop up at folk festivals or nighttime processions, marching in formations of about fifty to a hundred people, chanting right-wing extremist slogans. They usually disappeared as suddenly as they had arrived. The nighttime appearances, in particular, were reminiscent of Nazi torchlight processions. The masking was intended to prevent specific actions or statements from being attributed to individual persons. This intention is similar to that of the Black bloc of the Antifa.

== Propaganda ==
The Völkisch movement expresses itself through rhetoric about the impending "extinction of the people". Its actions were documented in professionally produced videos, which were distributed via right-wing extremist websites and heavily promoted on social media platforms.

Such marches occurred in only 21 locations before they were banned, usually with just a few dozen participants. However, because of the way the videos were edited, viewers got the impression that the number of participants was significantly higher. The images suggest that thousands were marching through the streets with the goal of abolishing democracy.

== See also ==
- White nationalism
- White supremacy
