= New Order (Portugal) =

New Order Ordem Nova
- Leader: Gilberto Santos e Castro
- General Secretary: Zarco Moniz Ferreira
- Founded: 1978; July 25, 1980 (as a party)
- Dissolved: 1982
- Headquarters: Rua Tomás Ribeiro, no. 8, Lisbon
- Ideology: Neo-fascism
- Political position: Far-right

The New Order (Portuguese: Ordem Nova) was a Portuguese neo-fascist political movement that existed between 1978 and 1982. Its headquarters were located in Lisbon.

The organisation was created by Gilberto Santos e Castro, a former commando leader in Portuguese Angola. The European Parliament report by the Committee of Inquiry into the Rise of Fascism and Racism in Europe defined its ideology as "revolutionary fascist" and "hyper-nationalist". The report also mentions close links to the Fuerza Nueva political party in Spain. Disbanded in 1982, it was said to continue its activities underground as of 1985, providing translations of CEDADE publications for distribution in Brazil. The flag of the organization was inspired by the "National Syndicalists" movement. The organization mostly recruited young students and workers into its ranks. A youth wing of the organization led by Paulo Teixeira Pinto existed.
