= Jungdeutsche Partei =

Former political party in Poland

Jungdeutsche Partei in Polen
- Young German Party in Poland

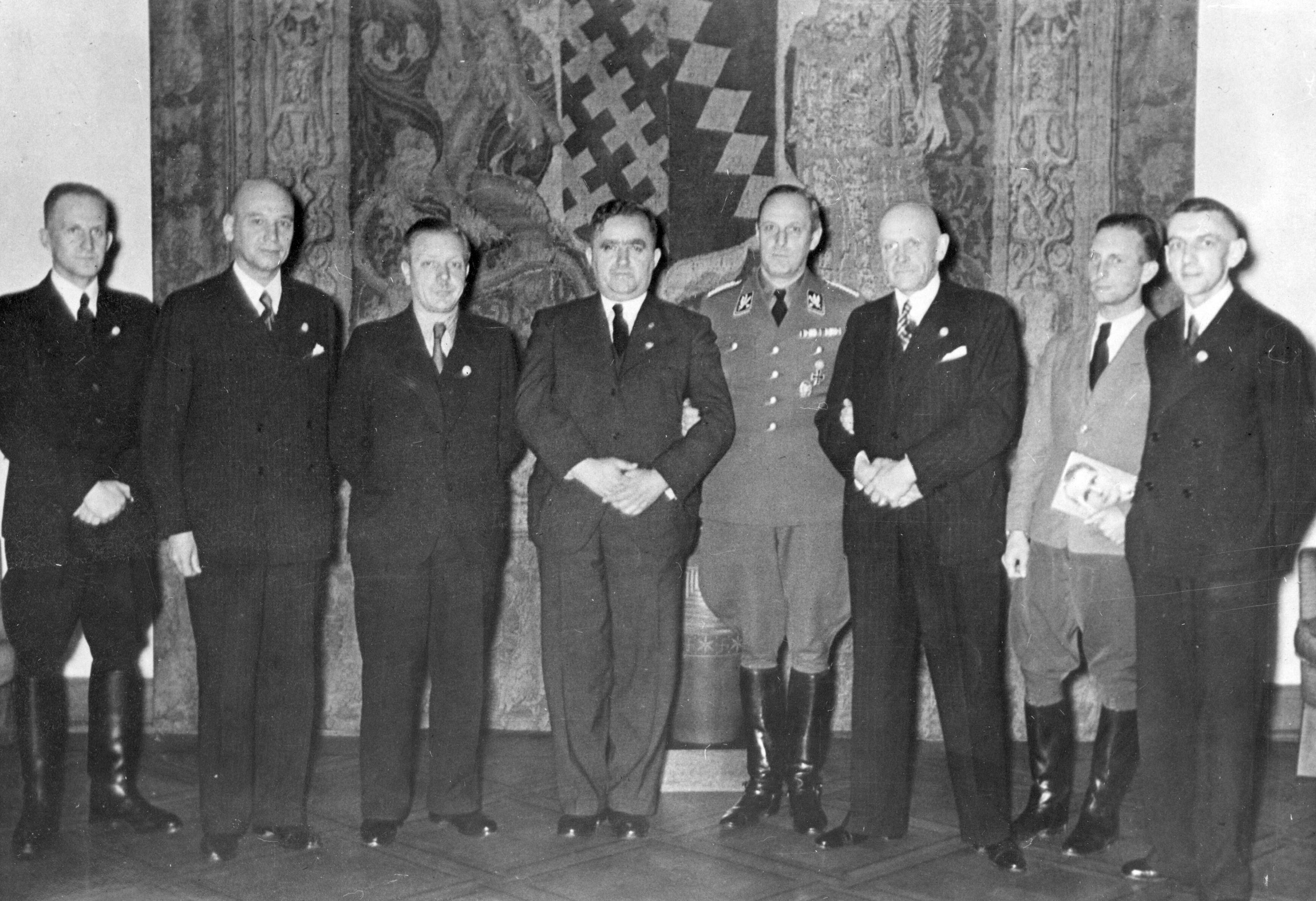
- Volksdeutsches decorated with the Golden Party Badge by Adolf Hitler in Berlin after Invasion of Poland in 1939. From left: Ludwig Wolff of Deutscher Volksverband, Otto Ulitz, Wagner, Rudolf Wiesner from Bielsko-Biała, Obergruppenführer Werner Lorenz, Erwin Hasbach from Ciechocinek, Gero von Gersdorff from Wielkopolska, and Weiss from Jarocin
- Established: 1931
- Type: Nazism
- Headquarters: Bielsko-Biała, Poland
- Leader: Rudolf Wiesner, Obersturmführer Max Wambeck (1938)
- Affiliations: Nazi Germany
- Remarks: Far-right politics

Jungdeutsche Partei in Polen (JDP), or the Young German Party in Poland (Polish: Partia Młodoniemiecka w Polsce), was a Nazi German extreme right-wing political party founded in 1931 by members of the ethnic German minority residing in the Second Polish Republic.

The party was opposed not only to collaboration with Poland, but also, with other German organizations in Poland. Its leader was Rudolf Wiesner, a committed Nazi. He was replaced by Max Wambeck from NSDAP on 22 November 1938. After the invasion of Poland Wambeck (fluent in Polish, known as Maksymilian Wambeck locally) served as SS-Obersturmführer in Chodzież in the Gnesen Gau (Polish Gniezno County) interrogating and torturing Home Army resistance members.

== Activities ==
Sponsored financially by the Ministry of Foreign Affairs of Nazi Germany, the Jungdeutsche Partei members trained in propaganda, sabotage and espionage activities against the Polish state, smuggled military weapons, and waged a campaign of intimidating other members of the community to leave for Nazi Germany, with tangible incentives. A considerable number of young Polish Germans joined the rank-and-file of the Party during the mid-1930s as a result of Nazi indoctrination and aggressive recruitment. The party had its own flag with JdP symbol in it, celebrated anniversaries (Heldengedenktag), a hymn sung at gatherings (Jungdeutsche marschiert) with a Nazi salute, and its own red armbands similar to NSDAP.

The Jungdeutsche Partei was formed originally in 1921 in Bielsko-Biała as the Deutscher Nationalsozialistischer Verein in Polen. Renamed in 1931 the party gradually expanded its activities to cover most of Upper Silesia with 1,200 members, and other regions such as Greater Poland (since 1934) as well as Pomerania and Volhynia in the following years. The public rallies held by the party were aggressively anti-Polish, rabidly racist, and anti-Jewish; while proclaiming to the world: "We want to be Germans, and nothing but Germans." JDP was dissolved by Adolf Hitler after the invasion of Poland with transfer of its membership to Germany.

== See also ==
- Deutscher Volksverband, the German People's Union in interwar Poland
- Deutsche Vereinigung, the German minority organization from northern Poland
- Sonderdienst, Nazi German paramilitary formations created after the invasion
