= National Socialist Action Party =

British neo-Nazi political party

The National Socialist Action Party (sometimes called the National Socialist Action Group) was a minor British neo-Nazi political party in the early 1980s. It gained notoriety due to its violent rhetoric and because of several exposés regarding the group's stockpiling of weapons and its plans for armed attacks.

== Origins ==
The NSAP was the brainchild of Tony Malski, who had been an organiser for the British Movement in London and who during the struggle for leadership of that group between Michael McLaughlin and Ray Hill had sided with Hill. Malski had been involved with the Campaign for Nationalist Unity, a John Tyndall-led initiative that involved elements of the British Movement along with his own New National Front and groups such as the Constitutional Movement and British Democratic Party. This group formed the basis of the British National Party in 1982, although Malski did not join that party.

From early on, Malski supported the use of force, and in 1981 at a meeting of far right activists he claimed that he had a stockpile of weapons hidden near his home in South Oxhey, Watford which he had seized during a raid on a nearby Territorial Army (TA) base. Malski himself had been a TA member and his house was searched for weapons on a number of occasions by Special Branch. Feeling that the British Movement did not match up to his militancy, Malski broke from them in mid 1982 and, along with his deputy Phil Kersey, established the NSAP.

== Development ==
The programme of the NSAP was based entirely on Nazism. The new party had a military-style structure with fifteen separate ranks awarded to party members at various levels, as well as four sub movements, the "Black Wolves", youth, women and "workforce". Malski's devotion to militarism earned him the mocking nickname of "the Field Marshal" amongst far right activists not associated with his fringe party. Given that the NSAP had less than a hundred members, these military-style ranks seemed somewhat spurious.

However, the NSAP did enjoy a close relationship with the influential League of St George, which published the NSAP's glossy magazine The European, and Malski maintained that it was committed to direct action. An early letter sent to all party members stated that they should "support any action of paramilitary groups which come to the rescue of our so much corrupt and infested country". The European similarly endorsed paramilitarism and claimed that an "effective paramilitary army" was being trained by the NSAP.

The militancy of the NSAP attracted press attention, and on more than one occasion articles appeared after undercover reporters claimed to have spoken to Malski. For example, a reporter for Searchlight wrote that Malski had told him that he intended to send NSAP fighters into riot-hit cities to foment discontent, and that he had links to the Edelweiss Group, a paramilitary training operation run by Column 88 founder Ian Souter Clarence. This report was followed by one in the News of the World in which Malski was quoted as having told their undercover reporter that the NSAP had a number of arms and ammunitions dumps. Such revelations led to Labour Party MP Joan Lestor calling for the Department of Public Prosecutions to investigate the activities of the NSAP, although ultimately they decided not to do so.

== Exposure ==
Ray Hill, with whom Malski was long acquainted, had become a "mole" within the far right and had agreed to co-operate with Dutch-Israeli film-maker Ludi Boeken on a documentary for Channel 4, part of which was to include an exposé on the activities of the NSAP. To this end Hill arranged to meet Malski and Kersey in a London pub in October 1983, ostensibly to discuss a meeting Hill had earlier held with Yann Tran Long, a French-Vietnamese arms dealer who maintained a wide circle of contacts within the far right across Europe. This meeting was filmed with a hidden camera and during it Malski claimed that the NSAP had around 1000 members and that members were regularly undertaking military-style training in a local gun club.

Malski also discussed his arrest by Special Branch in 1981 when he was preparing to travel to France to pick up detonators for explosive devices. This had been as part of an earlier plot that Malski had been involved with, along with Yann Tran Long and Alex Oumow of the Faisceaux Nationalistes Européens, and which was to plant a bomb at that year's Notting Hill Carnival. Hill had been privy to the discussions about this initial plot and had informed Searchlight about it before it could be carried out. Malski was filmed telling Hill that he believed the plot had been disrupted by a high-ranking informer within the British far right, although he pointed the finger at Anthony Hancock rather than at Hill.

Malski also told Hill that he had discovered the secret offices of Searchlight and published their address in The European (although the address published had actually been London Transport offices) as well as the details of the News of the World journalist who had written about the party. He further claimed that nine of the leading members of the NSAP were Oxbridge graduates and that an NSAP attack squad had cleared the way for a recent BNP march by attacking and defeating all the protesters. Hill subsequently rejected most of this as fantasy, but vouched for some other claims, notably that the NSAP was working closely with Ian Souter Clarence and that he and Oumow were receiving funding from the wealthy Spanish group CEDADE. The footage of Malski and Kersey formed a significant part of the documentary, which aired in March 1984, during which Hill revealed himself as the mole.

== Disappearance ==
Following the screening of the documentary, the NSAP ceased to operate and the name has not been used since although the party was publicly mentioned in 1986 when member Graham Paton was convicted of sending propaganda and a concealed razor blade to an anti-apartheid activist.

Malski, who was dismissed by many on the far right in Britain as something of a Walter Mitty character, has occasionally surfaced at meetings, including speeches by David Irving. In 2005 he was found guilty of racially harassing his neighbour, a woman of Pakistani origin. He has, on occasion, stood for election to St Albans District Council, as an independent. In 2013 he re-surfaced by contacting former NF associate David G.P. Williams of the Swinton Circle offering to speak for the organisation. The Swinton Circle declined Malski's offer, a rebuff which resulted in attempts to sabotage a musical concert being staged in Oxford by Robin Willow.

== Bibliography ==
- R. Hill & A. Bell, The Other Face of Terror- Inside Europe’s Neo-Nazi Network, London: Collins, 1988
