= South African National Front =

Neo-fascist organisation associated with the British National Front

- Abbreviation: SANF
- Formation: 1977
- Dissolved: 1980s
- Location: South Africa

The South African National Front, also known as the National Front of South Africa (SANF) was a neofascist pro-apartheid white nationalist paramilitary organization in South Africa. Formed in 1977, it was an initiative of John Tyndall of the British National Front; sister organisations were also formed in Australia and New Zealand at the same time.

SANF's first Chairman was Jack Noble, with the party being organized during the 1970s by Ray Hill. SANF channeled funds to the NF as part of an international network of neo-fascism. It moved beyond a mere gathering of expatriates when it linked up with Italian and Portuguese neo-fascists and the South African Ku Klux Klan. It also tried to link with the Afrikaner Resistance Movement (AWB) and the Herstigte Nasionale Party (HNP) (from whom it received funding) with the ultimate aim of a single united racist/neo-fascist party in South Africa but this 'embryonic’ party never came to fruition.

SANF published its own magazine Hitback. It also "published a number of anti-black and 'anti-Zionist' pamphlets which led to calls for it to be prosecuted for incitement to racial hatred", SANF’s policies would have led to a "massive increase in the death rate of black infants". By 1979 SANF's antisemitism led Jewish youths to threaten to take matters into their own hands; Harry Schwarz and Alf Widman of the Progressive Federal Party called on the government to do something about the party.

In 1979 the HNP replaced Noble as leader with Alan Fotheringham, a former HNP candidate, and Ray Hill returned to England.

== Wit Kommando ==
SANF formed its own paramilitary wing Wit Kommando/White Commando, a not unusual development in the context of right wing South African politics. In 1980 the Wit Kommando/White Commando began a campaign of terrorism mainly against blacks. A number of bombings took place, notably against the offices of the South African Institute of Race Relations and the University of South Africa. In 1981 they planned to also attack whites whom they regarded as "white kaffirs" or race mixers. The South African police made arrests and discovered a hitlist of targets which included Bishop Desmond Tutu, the White Commando having previously "threatened him repeatedly". Fotheringham was not charged but Max (Massimo) Bollo from SANF's national directorate, and leader of the Italian associated grouping UNIDO, received a lengthy jail sentence, as did two other fellow Italians. SANF disbanded in the early 1980s.

== See also ==
- British National Front
- New Zealand National Front (1977-2019)
- National Front Australia (1977-1984)
