= Kazimierz Dłuski =

Polish physician and activist

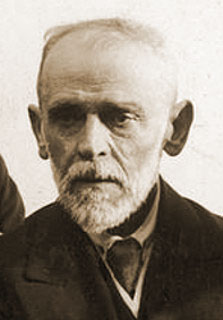
- Kazimierz Dłuski in 1926
- Born: 1855; Podolia Governorate, Southwestern Krai, Russian Empire
- Died: 6 September 1930 (aged 74–75); Otwock, Second Polish Republic
- Occupations: Physician, politician
- Spouse: Bronisława Dłuska
- Relatives: Marie Curie (sister-in-law)

Kazimierz Dłuski (Polish pronunciation: [kaˈʑimjɛʐ ˈdwuskʲi]; 1855–1930) was a Polish physician, and social and political activist. He was a member of the Polish Socialist Party. In later life, he was a founder and activist of many non-governmental organizations; he was the founder and first president of the Tatrzańskie Ochotnicze Pogotowie Ratunkowe (Tatras Volunteer Rescue Service).

He married fellow Polish physician Bronisława Skłodowska, an elder sister of Maria Skłodowska-Curie.

== See also ==
- Bolesław Prus: Dłuski's part in 1878 assault on Prus.
