= National Socialist Movement of Norway =

Norwegian neo-Nazi group

National Socialist Movement of Norway Norges Nasjonalsosialistiske Bevegelse
- Abbreviation: NNSB
- Leader: Erik Rune Hansen
- Founded: 1988
- Dissolved: 2007
- Ideology: Neo-Nazism
- Political position: Far-right
- International affiliation: World Union of National Socialists

Website
- nnsb.net (archived)

The National Socialist Movement of Norway (Norwegian: Norges Nasjonalsosialistiske Bevegelse, NNSB), formerly Zorn 88, was a Norwegian neo-Nazi group with an estimated 150 members, led by Erik Rune Hansen until his death in 2004. Founded in 1988, it was a secretive group with tight membership regulation.

== Ideology and activities ==
The NNSB expressed admiration for Adolf Hitler and Vidkun Quisling, and was focused on historical revisionism and antisemitism, particularly Holocaust denial. It published the magazine Gjallarhorn, and in 1999 published The Protocols of the Elders of Zion. Other recurrent topics included racial hygiene, Norse religion, the occult, UFOs, and the white genocide conspiracy theory. Several of its members were active Nazis as front fighters and members of Nasjonal Samling during World War II. The group had ties to Erik Blücher and the magazine Folk og Land, and to Varg Vikernes. It was part of international networks along with the World Union of National Socialists, the National Socialist Movement of Denmark, the Swedish National Socialist Front, and Blood & Honour. Along with Scandinavian groups it took part in celebrations and memorials to Adolf Hitler and Rudolf Hess.

In November 2007, a memorial ceremony at the German war cemetery in Oslo was attacked by anti-fascists, leaving five NNSB-members wounded, one severely. The NNSB pledged that it had no intentions of retaliating the attack. The group was eventually dissolved later the same year.
