= Phalanx (disambiguation) =

The phalanx is a rectangular mass military formation.

Phalanx may also refer to:

== Military ==
- Phalanx CIWS, a U.S. Navy defense system to protect against an anti-ship missile
- Royal Phalanx, a special military unit formed of veterans of the Greek War of Independence

== Politics ==
- North American Phalanx, a utopian community in New Jersey, organized on proto-communist Fourierist principles, or its journal The Phalanx
- The Spanish Falange
  - Falangism, ideology of the above
- Falanga National Radical Camp/RNR-Falanga/ONR-Falanga - Polish extreme right party
- The Lebanese Kataeb Party

== Places ==
- Phalanx, New Jersey, an unincorporated area within Colts Neck Township, New Jersey
- Phalanx, Ohio, an unincorporated community
- Phalanx Mountain, a summit in British Columbia

== Arts and literature ==
- Aliens: Phalanx, a 2020 science fiction horror novel by Scott Sigler
- Phalanx (art group), an artistic movement formed in Munich in 1901
- Phalanx (comics), a species of villainous mechanical aliens in Marvel Comics
- The Phalanx, a Fourierist journal
- Phalanx, a journal published by the Military Operations Research Society
- Phalanx, the name of the false zombie proof drug in the novel by Max Brooks, World War Z
- The Phalanx Nations, a terrorist organization in the young adult novel, The Prophet of Yonwood
- Phalanx, a 2012 Warhammer 40,000 novel

== Music ==
- Phalanx (album), a 1983 live album by Australian surf rock band, Australian Crawl
- Phalanx, a trance music group formed by Dennis Gertner, DJ Manian, and Manuel Schleis
- Phalanx (band), a jazz music group

== Medicine ==
- Phalanx bone, the bones that form fingers and toes

== Video games ==
- The fictional secret anti-alien invasion force the player commands in the fanmade UFO: Alien Invasion game, an open-source project in the X-COM tradition.
- Phalanx (video game), a Super NES and Game Boy Advance video game.
- The 13th Colossus from the video game Shadow of the Colossus.
- The first Demon (boss) in the PS3 game Demon's Souls.
- The nemesis of the protagonist in the Super NES game Demon's Crest.
- A Cabal enemy type from the video game Destiny.
- The standard ancient defensive unit in the Civilization series.

== Other uses ==
- Phalanx (mythology), a figure in Greek mythology
- Phalanx (honor society), the seniors honor society at Rensselaer Polytechnic Institute. There is a similarly named society at Clarkson University.
- Phalanstère, a building layout developed by utopian socialist Charles Fourier
- Phalanx (horse), American Champion racehorse
- The falanges (legions of spirits) of the Brazilian Umbanda religion
- Phalanx organization, an aircraft contractor
- Phalanx Family Ties, a street family in Law & Order: Special Victims Unit
