= French Falange =

French political party

French Falange Phalange Française
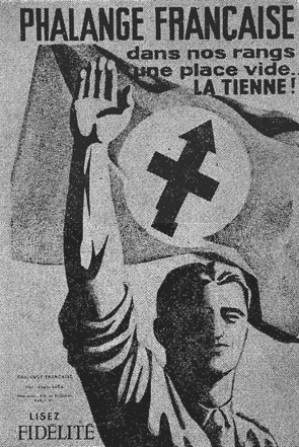
- Illustration from the newspaper of the group "Fidélité"
- Leader: Charles Luca
- Founded: 1955
- Dissolved: 1958
- Ideology: Falangism; Neo-Nazism; Neo-fascism; Anti-Semitism
- Political position: Far Right

French Falange (French: Phalange Française) was a Falangist political party in France founded and led by Charles Luca (pseudonym of Charles Gastaut). The party was founded in 1955 and dissolved on 15 May 1958 by a decree of the Pflimlin administration.

== History ==
=== Background ===
Charles Luca was a journalist and nephew of the wife of collaborationist leader Marcel Déat. After the end of World War II, Luca was imprisoned in Fresnes Prison for his activities in the National Popular Rally and the Organisation Todt.

When Luca was released, he founded an organisation called the Saint-Exupéry Military Preparation Society, a purportedly apolitical organisation dedicated to tasks of public interest.

However, this was a facade for a network of former Collaborationists and Neo-Nazis. They ran training camps for young recruits, teaching them how to handle weaponry.

The Society was dissolved by the Ministry of the Interior in 1950.

=== Foundation ===
The group went through multiple other iterations, including the National Citadel Movement and the French Socialist Party until becoming the Phalange Française.

There they began a newspaper, "Fidélité" and began distributing pamphlets supporting the French forces in the Algerian War and condemning the Independence of Tunisia.

A trade union, the Front Uni du Travail (United Labour Front, FUT), and a youth wing called the Young Falangists were also founded by the group.

=== Dissolution ===
By 1959, the organisation was gaining popularity. It had established groups in the majority of France and a hierarchy was imposed for the administration of the branches.

However, in the same year the group was banned by the Ministry of the Interior along with other French fascist groups.

This gave rise to numerous successor organisations led by Luca, but none of them ever had the momentum to act as the heir to the group.

In 1963, Luca gave up all political activity.
