= Russian National Socialist Party =

Russian neo-Nazi group

Flag used by the National Socialist Movement-Russian Division

The Russian National Socialist Party (Russian: Русская Национальная Социалистическая Партия, romanized: Russkaya Natsional'naya Sotsialisticheskaya Partiya) is a neo-Nazi group based in Russia.

== Development ==
The party grew out of the followers of Konstantin Kasimovsky, a leading member of Pamyat in the immediate aftermath of the collapse of the Soviet Union. He split from the Pamyat-led National Patriotic Front in 1992 and formed his own party, the Russian National Union, the following year. This party re-emerged as the RNSP around 1999 after Kasimovsky closed down the Russian National Union and began to move away from the emphasis placed on the Russian Orthodox Church by that group. Despite this lessening of emphasis on religion the party's website lists Eastern Orthodoxy as one of its four main ideological principles, the others being a strong state, aggressive Russian nationalism and non-Marxist socialism. The party symbol is the Labarum of Constantine the Great and since 1999 have published a newspaper Pravoye Soprotivleniye ('Right Resistance'), itself a successor to the earlier journal Shturmovik.

Kasimovsky has since claimed to be the leader of a group called Russian Action although its nature, and that of its relationship to the RNSP, remains unclear.

== See also ==
- National Socialist Society
