= Stichting Oud Politieke Delinquenten =

Dutch right-wing organisation

The Stichting Oud Politieke Delinquenten ("Foundation of Former Political Delinquents"; abbreviated SOPD) was a Dutch right-wing organization founded by and for formerly jailed and convicted war criminals, who had collaborated with the German occupiers during World War II. The SOPD was the first and the largest of the collaborationist organizations in the country, "numbering perhaps a hundred former internees."

== Foundation and dissolution ==
The SOPD was founded in 1951 by Jan Hartman, formerly of the NSB, the fascist party that allied itself with the German Nazi movement after the occupation of the Netherlands in 1940. Hartman became the organization's secretary. A co-founder was the lawyer Jan Wolthuis, another former NSB member who had been a justice of the peace in Arnhem during the German occupation, essentially an NSB appointment to a political office meant to render Anton Mussert immune from prosecution and to handle infractions committed by NSB matters.

The organization was "tolerated" by the Dutch government, but a political party, founded by SOPD member Paul van Tienen, was not. Van Tienen, an associate of Swedish fascist Per Engdahl, had founded a Dutch chapter of Engdahl's European Social Movement, the Werkgemeenschap Europa in de Lage Landen ("Working Community Europe in the Low Countries"), in 1951. He merged this group with the SOPD to form "the first post-war extreme-right party in the Netherlands", the Nationaal Europese Sociale Beweging ("National European Social Movement"). The party had numbered between 100 and 400 members, all "old comrades", and was banned in 1954 by a Dutch court on the basis of a 1944 decree signed by Queen Wilhelmina, the "Resolution concerning the Dissolution of Treasonable Organisations", a decision confirmed by the Supreme Court of the Netherlands in 1955.

== See also ==
- Florentine Rost van Tonningen
- Nederlandsche SS
