= IKEA Foundation =

Non-profit organization in the Netherlands

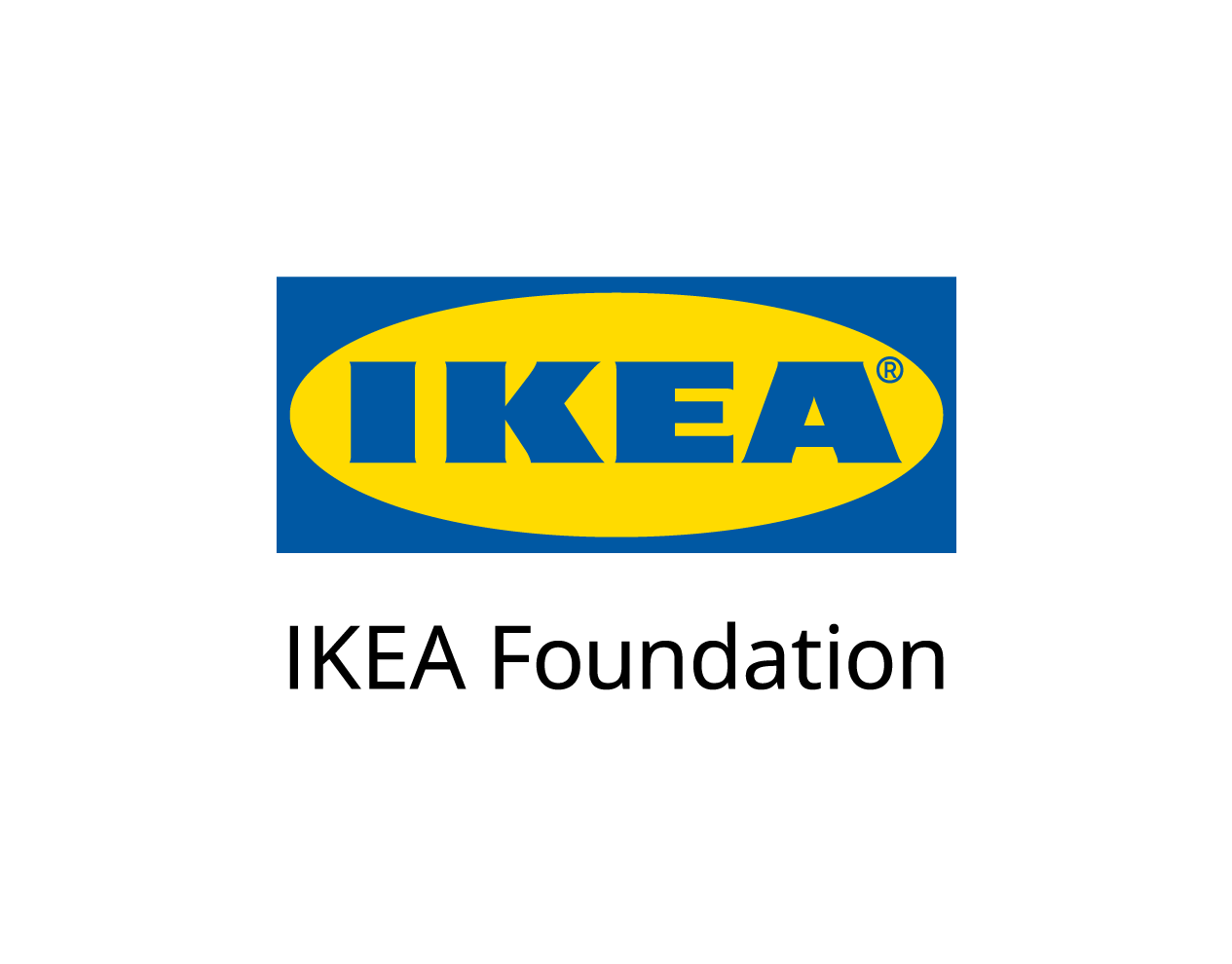
- Established: 1982; 44 years ago
- Founder: Ingvar Kamprad
- Type: Independent charitable foundation under Dutch law
- Legal status: Stichting
- Purpose: Sustainable livelihoods; Climate change
- Location: The Netherlands
- Chief executive officer: Jessica Anderen
- Budget: €282.7 million (2022)
- Disbursements: €268.2 million
- Expenses: €14.5 million (2022)
- Funding: Stichting INGKA Foundation
- Website: ikeafoundation.org
- Financials as of 2022

IKEA ownership chart
Flowchart showing the structure and ownership of IKEA companies. Parent companies are at the top of the chart.
Provides services to | Is the parent of | Provides funding to

The IKEA Foundation is a Dutch not-for-profit organisation founded in 1982 by Ingvar Kamprad as a means to support advancement in interior design and architecture. In 2009, the Foundation's charter was expanded to benefit vulnerable children. In 2018, the Foundation shifted its focus to supporting the development of sustainable livelihoods and combatting climate change. The Foundation is led by chief executive officer Jessica Anderen. In 2022, it provided €268.2 million in grants.

== History ==
The Foundation was created by Ingvar Kamprad in 1982 to advance "innovation in the field of architectural and interior design." In 2006, The Economist reported that the Stichting INGKA Foundation funded the IKEA Foundation, which did not publish its giving numbers. The Economist calculated the value of the INGKA Foundation at €28.67 billion, making it the world's wealthiest charity at the time, and reported the IKEA Foundation had given a comparatively small amount and concentrated its donations on the Lund Institute, providing €1.35 million to the Institute annually. It also reported that the arrangement allowed the INGKA Foundation to make pay minimal taxes, make minimal disclosures, and made IKEA immune to takeover, while allowing the Kamprad family to make a large profit. In 2009, following the publication of the Economist article, Kamprad fought a court battle to change the legal mission of the IKEA Foundation to benefit vulnerable children. Prior to this, the foundation's articles of association limited the foundation's purpose to architecture and it had given a relatively small amount of its assets to the Lund Institute of Technology. The organisation's focus shifted to combating climate change and supporting the development of sustainable livelihoods in 2018.

== Philanthropic activities ==
The Foundation is organised as a not-for-profit Public Benefit Organization with the Tax and Customs Administration. Between 2009 and 2021, the Foundation provided more than €1.5 billion in grants. In 2022, it received €281.8 million from the Stichting INGKA Foundation, of which it provided €268.2 million in grants. The INGKA Foundation is the sole funder of the IKEA Foundation. Its grants are primarily related to global economic development and climate change. Inside Philanthropy described the Foundation as transparent but difficult to reach, noting that it does not accept unsolicited proposals and prefers to provide grants to established organizations over recently created initiatives.

=== Climate change and environment ===
In 2021, the IKEA and Rockefeller foundations partnered to create a fund to expand access to renewable energy generation in India, Nigeria, Ethiopia, and other countries. Each foundation pledged €422.76 million to the effort. The Financial Times reported the foundations set targets to reduce annual CO_{2} emissions by one billion tonnes and eliminate energy poverty for one billion people by the end of 2029. The Bezos Earth Fund later also pledged €422.76 million. The fund received an additional €6.76 billion in pledges from multilateral banks and the World Bank, Asian Development Bank, and U.S. International Development Finance Corporation. At COP26, this fund was launched as the Global Energy Alliance for People and Planet, a group with the goal to provide renewable energy to people in Africa, Asia, and Latin America. The same year, the IKEA Foundation partnered with Enviu and the Circular Apparel Innovation Factory to reduce textile waste in India. Also in 2021, the Foundation cofounded the Global Methane Hub, which garnered more than €284.89 million that year in commitments to reduce agricultural methane production.

In May 2022, the Foundation committed €5.51 million to the Sustainable Energy for All's Universal Energy Facility, a results-based financing initiative. In November of the same year, the Foundation and Acumen partnered on a €23.74 million energy investment initiative to provide renewable power generation and efficient appliances to people living in extreme poverty.

The Foundation pledged €33.82 million in funding to the Clean Air Fund in 2023. The same year, the Foundation partnered with the Selco Foundation and the Ministry of Health and Family Welfare to provide renewable energy and energy efficient equipment to 25,000 healthcare facilities in India. The IKEA Foundation provided initial funding of €48 million for the project. It also partnered with the ClimateWorks Foundation to support a just energy transition in Indonesia, South Africa, and Vietnam. It committed €16.91 million over four years to the effort.

In 2024, the Foundation pledged €17.09 million to the Science Based Targets initiative.

The Foundation is a funder of the We Mean Business Coalition, Science Based Targets initiative, Instituto Clima e Sociedade, InfluenceMap, and Climate Breakthrough.

=== Refugees, agriculture, and emergency response ===
Between 2012 and 2019, the Foundation invested approximately €89.33 million in United Nations High Commissioner for Refugees operations in Dollo Ado refugee camps. According to a 2020 report by the University of Oxford Refugee Studies Centre, it was the largest private sector investment made in a specific refugee setting. The funds were grouped into two phases. From 2012 through 2014, a €46.29 million grant was distributed to address infrastructure and emergency aid needs, including investments in education, shelter, nutrition, water, sanitation, and hygiene. From 2015 to 2019, a €33.5 million grant supported refugee livelihoods and establishment of self-reliance. This phase emphasized investments in agriculture, livestock, environment, energy, and microfinance loan initiatives. At the end of 2018, the livelihood program had 2,050 members earning income, and had disbursed 525 loans.

In 2014, the Foundation raised €7.98 million to provide lighting in the Al Azraq refugee camp. It ran a similar campaign that year to provide additional lighting to refugee camps in Bangladesh, Chad, Ethiopia, and Sudan. The following year, the Foundation began funding the Better Shelter organisation, which produces a flat-packed shelter consisting of a steel frame, stab-proof polypropylene panels, and rooftop solar panels. In 2016, the Design Museum awarded its Design of the Year award to the Better Shelter. Between June 2015 and January 2017, the shelters were sent to Nepal, Djibouti, Greece, and Iraq. The City of Zürich ordered 62 shelters, but could not use them as they did not meet Swiss fire regulations. A spokesperson for Better Shelters noted that they were not intended to meet Swiss fire regulations or be used indoors as the city planned. In April 2017, 10,000 of the shelters were retired due to fire concerns. Better Shelter announced that month the shelters would be redesigned to address the concerns as well as have better ventilation, lighting, and stronger frames and wall panels. As of December 2023, more than 90,000 shelters had been delivered globally.

The Foundation donated €6.88 million in 2019 to a fund helping Syrian refugees find employment. It partnered with the Swiss Agency for Development and Cooperation and the United States Agency for International Development in 2020 to make a €26.27 million investment in Aceli Africa, an American nonprofit that assists with securing agricultural loans for small and medium businesses in Africa.

In 2022, the Foundation donated 20 million euro to help refugees of the Russian invasion of Ukraine. According to data from the UN Office for the Coordination of Humanitarian Affairs and UNDP, the Foundation paid $22.5 of donations for Ukraine (as of 31 August 2024).

The Foundation also provided €11.23 million in funding to Renewable Energy for Refugees, a project that The Guardian reported had installed 183 streetlights, 4,000 solar home systems and 5,600 stoves across three refugee camps and nearby villages in Rwanda, as of April 2022. Following the 2023 Turkey–Syria earthquakes, the Foundation donated €10.16 million to Doctors Without Borders, which had already been established in the region due to ongoing conflict.

The IKEA Foundation is also a funder of the Save the Children Fund, the Global Alliance for the Future of Food, SNV, Global Alliance for Mass Entrepreneurship, and The BOMA Project. As of December 2023, the Foundation was providing 38 agriculture-related grants totaling €165 million.

== See also ==
- List of wealthiest foundations
- Financial endowment
- Private foundation
- Foundation (nonprofit)
