= Renate Haußleiter-Malluche =

German politician (1917–1994)

- Born: Renate Münzberg; 8 May 1917; Breslau, Province of Silesia, Germany
- Died: November 27, 1994 (aged 77)
- Occupations: Physician; Politician
- Political party: DG 1949–1965; AUD 1965–1979; The Greens 1980–1989
- Spouse: August Haußleiter (1963)
- Children: 5

Renate Haußleiter-Malluche (8 May 1917 – 27 November 1994), began her professional career as a Germany|German pediatrician, becoming after 1945 a politician in Bavaria

As Renate Malluche she sat as a member of the Bavarian state parliament (Landtag) between 1950 and 1954, representing the German Community (DG) until 1952, and subsequently as an independent member. A fellow DG member who also sat as an independent member in the Landtag after the DG faction disintegrated in 1952 was the more than averagely colourful politician-journalist August Haußleiter, whom she married approximately ten years later.

== Life ==
=== Early years ===
Renate Münzberg was born in 1917 Breslau, then the administrative capital of the Province of Silesia and a booming manufacturing and industrial city, where the population had quadrupled in the fifty years before her birth. As a young woman she was a "Gauführerin" (regional leader) in the League of German Girls, effectively the female youth wing of the German Nazi Party which took power at the start of 1933. She studied medicine and in 1941 qualified to work as a physician. Her first job was as an assistant doctor at the Breslau University Children's Clinic. She moved on to work as an assistant doctor at a quarantine hospital in Ernsdorf, in the south of Silesia.

=== War years ===
At Ernsdorf during the war she was frequently on emergency shifts lasting 24 hours. Food and drink were strictly rationed, while military offices enjoyed much less restricted rations than those designated as civilians. Renate Malluche accordingly resolved to have herself transferred to the military, and she became one of two female doctors to be promoted to the status of an army officer. After the war ended, in May 1945, she was one of millions subjected to ethnic cleansing in connection with the westward shift of Polish frontiers agreed between the leaders of the winning powers: she ended up as a self-employed physician in Gößweinstein, a small town in lower Bavaria located between Nuremberg and Bayreuth.

=== Politics ===
As early as 1948 Malluche was elected to the Pegnitz district council as a member of Notgemeinschaft Deutschlands, a quasi-political right-wing grouping with link to the Protestant church. In 1949, she participated in the founding of Deutsche Gemeinschaft (DG), a nationalist-neutralist political movement with far-right tendencies. She served as general secretary of DG from 1952, also serving as a member of its Bavarian leadership committee, until it was subsumed into the still far right, but more broadly based Action Group of Independent Germans.

In 1950 she was elected to the Bavarian state parliament (Landtag). The DG took part in the 1950 on a joint platform with the All-German Bloc/League of Expellees and Deprived of Rights which was a significant element in the Bavarian political landscape during the later 1940s and 1950s. The 1954 regional elections delivered a disappointing result in Bavaria for the Deutsche Gemeinschaft (DG) and she was obliged to resign her seat at the end of November 1954.

Renate Malluche married her fellow DG member August Haußleiter in the summer of 1963, and two years later, in May 1965, the two of them co-founded the Action Group of Independent Germans, a coming together of various fringe political groups on the right of the spectrum which individually had enjoyed little electoral success during the preceding twenty years. She was again a member of the leadership committee. In 1979 the AUD in its turn was one of a number of minor political parties and groupings from across the left-right spectrum involved in forming the German Green party. Haußleiter-Malluche again held party office under the new arrangements, serving as the regional party treasurer in Bavaria.
