= Dachverband der Nationalen Sammlung =

- Leader: DG: August Haußleiter; DSB: Karl-Heinz Priester; DB: Karl Meißner
- Founded: May 8, 1953
- Registered: July 19, 1953
- Dissolved: after September 6, 1953
- Ideology: German nationalism Factions: Neo-fascism; Europe a Nation; Pacifism
- Political position: Far-right
- Alliance members: German Community (DG); German Social Movement (DSB); German Bloc (DB)

The Dachverband der Nationalen Sammlung (lit. 'Umbrella organization of the national gathering', DNS) was a short-lived electoral alliance between three minor far-right parties for the 1953 West German federal election. It consisted of the German Community (DG), the German Social Movement (DSB) and the German Bloc (DB). Although the DSB and DG had cooperated since 15 November 1952, the electoral alliance, which by then also included the DB, was officially founded on 8 May 1953 and constituted itself as a political party in the sense of the German party law on 19 July 1953.

The alliance was unsuccessful during the election, only receiving 0.26% of the national vote (70,726 second votes), underperforming the German Realm Party as well as the DG's previous results in its home state Bavaria. The fact that the alliance only ran in two states, Baden-Württemberg and Bavaria, also contributed to its low result.

Soon after the election, Priester's German Social Movement (DSB) would leave this alliance, accusing the leaders of the two other parties of not being nationalist enough in their previous speeches. In fact, there were also notable ideological differences between particularly the DSB and the German Community (DG), with the former believing the age of nation-states to have past, instead preferring a unified fascist Europe (in line with the Europe a Nation idea); while the DG was a staunch supporter of the independent nation-state. Following this break, the DSB would declare itself to be a non-partisan group.
