= Jan Hartman =

Jan Hartman may refer to:

- Jan Hartman (Nazi collaborator) (1887–1969), Dutch fascist and Nazi collaborator during World War II
- Jan Hartman (philosopher) (born 1967), Polish philosopher and bioethicist
