= German Social Movement =

German Social Movement Deutsch-Soziale Bewegung
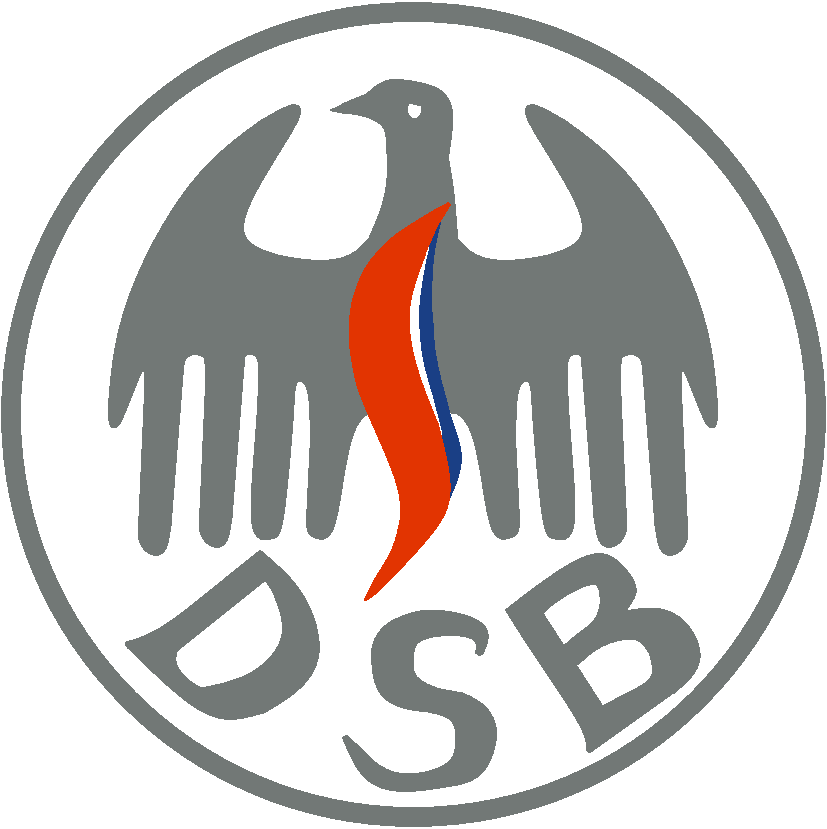
- Leader: Karl-Heinz Priester
- Founded: 4 December 1949; 76 years ago
- Dissolved: 1970s; 55 years ago
- Preceded by: European Nationale AKD; Sammlung zur Tat; European People's Movement of Germany
- Succeeded by: Free Socialist People's Party
- Newspaper: Der Weg Nach Vorn
- Membership: ca. 300
- Ideology: Neo-fascism; Corporatism; Pan-European nationalism
- Political position: Far-right
- European affiliation: European Social Movement

The German Social Movement (German: Deutsch-Soziale Bewegung), short-form: DSB, was a neo-fascist organization in West Germany. It existed from 1951 into the 1970s and acted as the German section of the European Social Movement (ESB). The DSB was founded and led by Karl-Heinz Priester.

== History ==
Contacts between Karl-Heinz Priester and Per Engdahl date back to July 1949, when Priester founded the European Nationale, Working Group Germany (German: Europäische Nationale, Arbeitskreis Deutschland), a group that unsuccessfully tried to influence the National Democratic Party (NDP). On 1 May 1951, only 15 days before the foundation of the European Social Movement (ESB), Priester founded the European Social Movement in Germany (German: Europäische Soziale Bewegung in Deutschland) together with members of the Sammlung zur Tat (SzT) and the European People's Party of Germany (EVD) in Eschborn by Frankfurt. This group would soon after be renamed German Social Movement (DSB).

The newspaper published by the organization was called The European Nationale (German: Die Europäische Nationale), renamed to The Path Forwards (German: Der Weg Nach Vorn).

To partake in the 1953 West German federal election, the DSB formed an electoral alliance named Dachverband der Nationalen Sammlung (DNS) with the German Community (DG) and the German Bloc (DB) on 8 May 1953. This alliance went on to receive 0.26% of the vote. Priester and his DSB would leave this alliance soon after the election, accusing the leaders of the two other parties of not being nationalist enough. After this break, the DSB, which was only active in Hesse and Lower Saxony at the time, declared itself non-partisan.This non-partisanship of the organization didn't last long however as Priester helped in the construction of an electoral alliance with the German Empire Party (DRP) for the following federal election, albeit him declining to join the alliance once it was actually founded. Another electoral alliance, under his leadership, was planned to be founded in April 1960 to partake in the 1961 West German federal election; this plan was scrapped however when Priester died only a few days before the date it was supposed to be founded.

Karl-Heinz Priester was succeeded by Hermann Schimmel as the leader of the DSB. At least parts of the DSB would later merge into the Free Socialist People's Party (FSVP).

== Ideology ==
The DSB adopted the Malmö-declaration of the European Social Movement, which was partially written by Priester, as its program. Priester strongly supported European-Arab cooperation, the Algerian National Liberation Front and the Eurafrica concept. The leader of the DSB, Karl-Heinz Priester, was a frequent sight at European meetings of neo-fascists and corporatists, representing his organization, including multiple meetings with Oswald Mosley. Priester supported a united Europe as a 'third force' against the west and east, believing the age of nation-states to have ended.

== Literature ==
- Stöss, Richard. Parteien-Handbuch Band 1: AUD bis EFP - Die Parteien der Bundesrepublik Deutschland 1949-1980. Westdeutscher Verlag. ISBN 3-531-11570-7
- Stöss, Richard. Parteien-Handbuch Band 2: FDP bis WAV - Die Parteien der Bundesrepublik Deutschland 1949-1980. Westdeutscher Verlag. ISBN 3-531-11592-8
