= NESB =

NESB may refer to:

- National European Social Movement (Nationaal Europese Sociale Beweging), a Dutch neo-Nazi party, 1953–1955
- New England School of Broadcasting, original name of New England School of Communications
- Non-English speaking background, superseded term used in social discourse relating to multiculturalism in Australia
