= Frakta =

Bag manufactured by IKEA

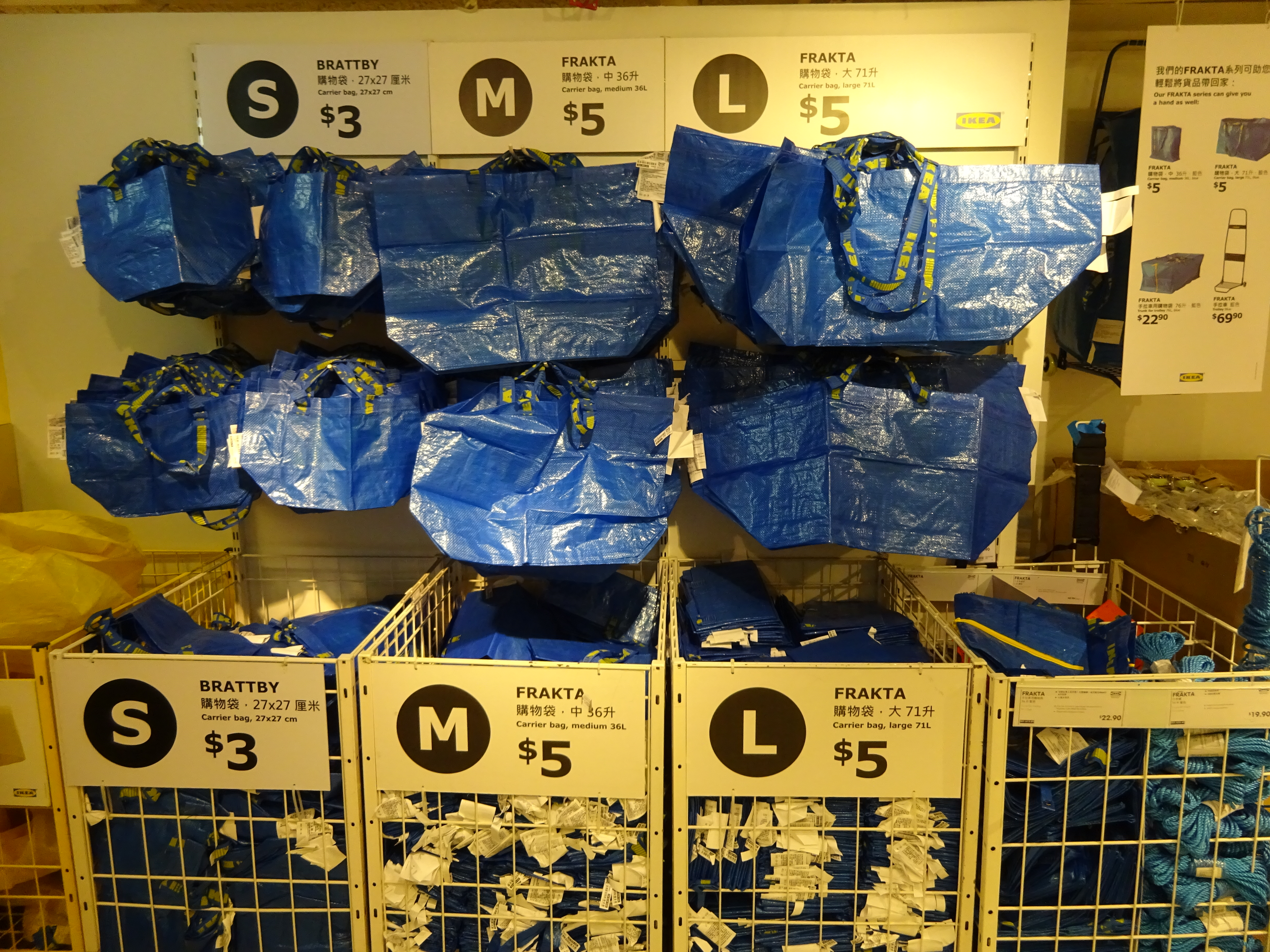
Frakta bags for sale at an IKEA outlet in Hong Kong

The Frakta (stylized as FRAKTA) is a reusable tote bag manufactured by IKEA.

== History ==
In the 1960's, IKEA started selling smaller home furnishing products such as tea lights, glasses, duvet covers, etc. IKEA's creator, Ingvar Kamprad and his assistant Sten Lundén wanted a way to help customers carry smaller items home. Kamprad studied customers at the store and he wanted a bag that can be carried on their shoulder, hung from a shopping cart, and carried in the hand.

On a trip to Taiwan, Kamprad and The head of purchasing, Lars Göran Peterson (commonly known by his initials, LGP) found a suitable manufacturer to make the bag. They specified that the bag be able to hold 50 kg and large enough to carry wallpaper-rolls. Soon after, IKEA released the yellow bag which was a precursor to the FRAKTA, only available to be used in stores. Kamprad wanted two different bags in order to differentiate which bags could be purchased, and which could not. The yellow bag is kept for store-use only, and the blue bag can be purchased and taken home.

== Product ==
The standard large FRAKTA is a 71 litres (19 gal) polypropylene, blue tote bag; it is 35 cm (13¾") tall, 55 cm (21¾") long and 37 cm (14½") wide. The most notable feature of the bag is the price and its versatility. The bag costs in IKEA's homeland of Sweden, 9 kronor, while in the U.S., it is $0.99 and can be re-used indefinitely because is easily cleaned and durable. It can hold up to 25 kg (55 lbs)

== Similar products ==
IKEA also sells similar products with the same FRAKTA name such as a smaller 36 litres (10 gal) bag which can also hold up to 25 kg (55 lbs) and a cooler bag designed for keeping food cold.

IKEA Singapore has introduced a padded version of its iconic Frakta carrier bag, called Resten, which doubles as a pillow for convenience while traveling. This multi-functional bag was launched in Singapore, a country noted for its high levels of sleep deprivation.

== Balenciaga clone ==
In 2017, The designer brand Balenciaga created a bag that shares a striking resemblance to the FRAKTA bag which cost $2,145 and is marketed as an extra large shopper tote. However, Balenciaga's bag has some differences, like a zipper closure which is not on the FRAKTA bag.

=== IKEA's response ===
An IKEA spokesperson told TODAY that IKEA was "deeply flattered that the Balenciaga tote bag resembles the Ikea iconic sustainable blue bag for 99 cents. Nothing beats the versatility of a great big blue bag!" IKEA also made various ads responding to the designer bag. The ads told customers how to identify an original FRAKTA bag and suggested customers just go get the original.
