= Jan Hartman (Nazi collaborator) =

Dutch fascist and Nazi collaborator during World War II

Jan Hartman (1887–1969) was a Dutch fascist and collaborator during World War II. After the war, he was active in far-right politics, and was one of the two founders of the Stichting Oud Politieke Delinquenten ("Foundation of Former Political Delinquents"; abbreviated SOPD), a right-wing organization founded by and for formerly jailed and convicted war criminals and collaborators.

== Biography ==
=== Until 1945 ===
Hartman was born in Beilen and as a young man spent time in Germany. In the 1930s he joined the NSB and worked in propaganda, and in 1941 he volunteered with the Waffen-SS and (like Paul van Tienen) saw action at the Eastern Front.

=== After the war ===
After the war Hartman was sentenced to ten years but was released early, in 1950, on probation. He founded the SOPD together with Jan Wolthuis in 1951. Hartman became the organization's secretary. The SOPD was the first and the largest of the collaboratist organizations in the country, "numbering perhaps a hundred former internees." In 1952 he and Wolthuis played a never fully explained part in the escape of seven convicted war criminals from the Koepelgevangenis in Breda, including Klaas Carel Faber.

From the mid-1950s on Hartman was particularly active in attempts to rehabilitate and provide for veterans of the Eastern Front. After his death in 1969, a Jan Hartman Foundation (Jan Hartman Stichting) was established; it claimed to be a charitable institution for former "political delinquents", offering various kinds of assistance including legal aid. An attempt to found a Jan Hartman House in the 1970s (as a kind of Bronbeek for Eastern Front volunteers) were unsuccessful.
