= New Swedish Movement =

New Swedish Movement Nysvenska rörelsen
- Leader: Per Engdahl
- Founded: 1941
- Dissolved: 1980
- Split from: National League of Sweden
- Headquarters: Malmö
- Newspaper: Vägen Framåt
- Membership: 8,632
- Ideology: Fascism; Swedish nationalism National conservatism Social conservatism Corporatism; Anti-communism
- Political position: Far-right

The New Swedish Movement (Swedish: Nysvenska rörelsen) was a far-right political movement in Sweden that emphasized strong Swedish nationalism, corporatism and anti-communism as well as a cult of personality around Per Engdahl.

Engdahl founded the organization in 1941 under the name "Swedish opposition" (Svensk Opposition) after Engdahl and his supporters broke away from the National League of Sweden. He designated the group's ideology as nysvenskhet (roughly, New Swedishness). During World War II the party supported the Third Reich. Despite this, the party overtly rejected National Socialism, instead looking more towards Benito Mussolini for inspiration while also seeking to unify all groups against democracy, whether they were fascist or not. According to Swedish archives the group had 8,632 members. It played a central role in the attempt to create a European association of fascist parties and associations, the European Social Movement (ESM).

IKEA founder Ingvar Kamprad was a member from 1942 until at least 1945.
