= Elisabeth Åsbrink =

Swedish author and journalist (born 1965)

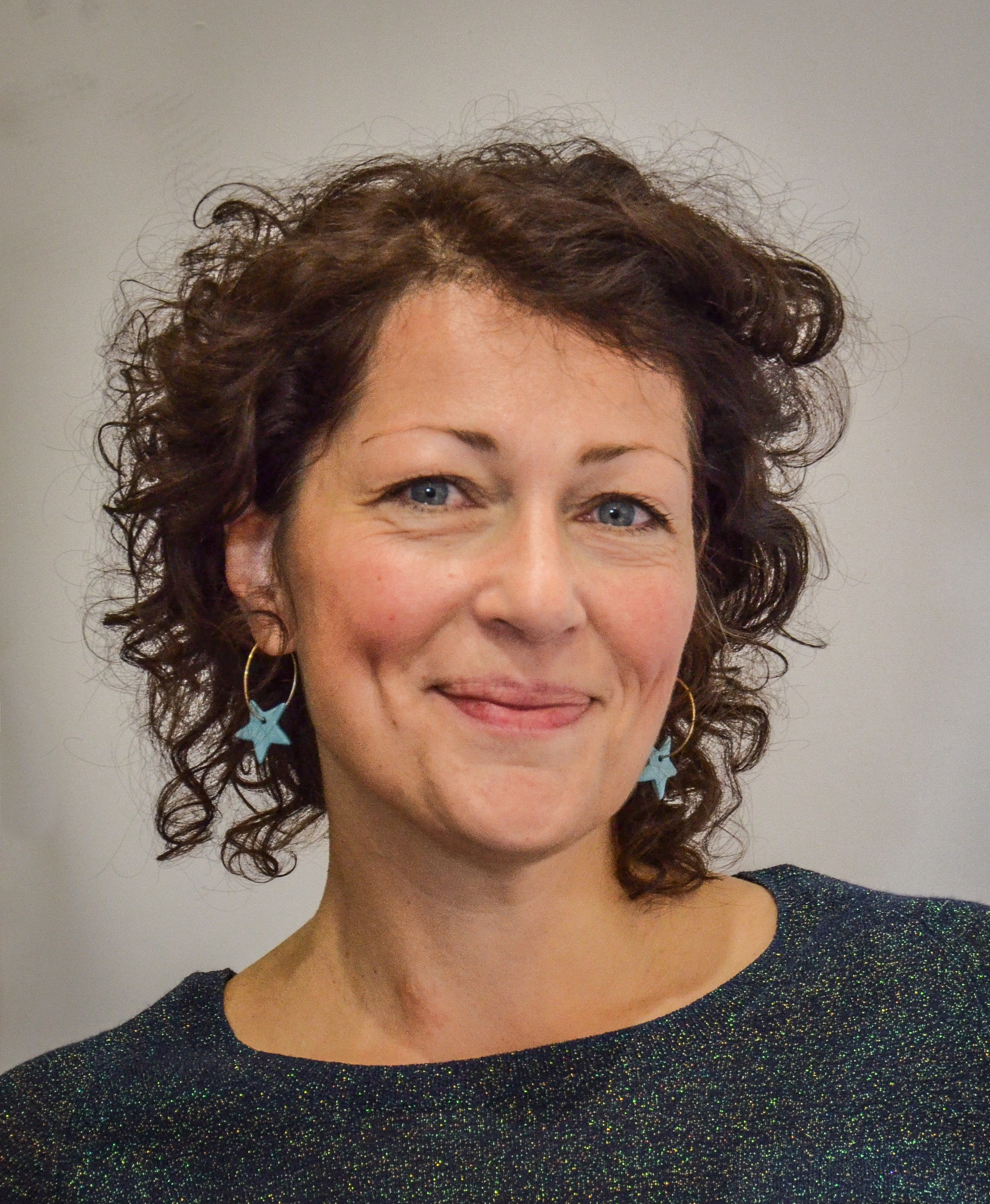
- Åsbrink in 2012
- Born: 29 April 1965 (age 60); Gothenburg, Sweden
- Occupations: Author, journalist

Elisabeth Katherine Åsbrink (born 29 April 1965) is a Swedish author and journalist.

== Biography ==
Åsbrink made her debut with the book Smärtpunkten – Lars Norén, pjäsen Sju tre och morden i Malexander. The book was nominated for the August Prize for non-fiction in 2009, and is translated into Polish.

In August 2011, she released the book Och i Wienerwald står träden kvar based on 500 letters written to a young boy from his family in Vienna after he had fled to Sweden in 1939 as a refugee from the Nazis. The book received a lot of attention as it revealed new information about IKEA founder Ingvar Kamprad that he had been placed under surveillance by the security police. In 1943 the police created a dossier on him under the heading "Nazi". The book also revealed that in an interview Åsbrink made with Kamprad in 2010 he said that he had been loyal to the Swedish fascist leader Per Engdahl. Åsbrink won the August Prize for best non-fiction in 2011 for Och i Wienerwald står träden kvar, the Danish-Swedish Cultural Foundations annual Culture Prize 2013 and in May 2014 she received the Ryszard Kapuściński Award in Warsaw. The book was translated into English by Saskia Vogel as And in the Vienna Woods The Trees Remain (2020). It has also been translated into German, Dutch, Polish, Danish, Norwegian, Slovakian, Czech and Estonian.

In 2012 she debuted as a playwright with the play Räls, based on the authentic minutes from a meeting convened by Hermann Göring in 1938, and interviews with child refugees from Nazi Germany. This was followed by the plays Pojken och det sjungande trädet and Dr Alzheimer. On 13 July 2010, Åsbrink was the host of the radio show Sommar i P1 on Swedish Public Radio, Sveriges Radio.

In 2016, Åsbrink published the non-fiction title 1947, which was nominated for the August Prize in that year. This biography of a year has been published in many other languages, including English (as 1947: When Now Begins, translated by Fiona Graham and published by Scribe in the UK and by Other Press in the US and Canada).

Her latest book, Made in Sweden: 25 Ideas that Created a Country, was published in Australia by Scribe in 2019.
