= Stichting INGKA Foundation =

Dutch nonprofit organization

- Founder: Ingvar Kamprad
- Type: Foundation
- Headquarters: Liechtenstein
- Region served: Worldwide
- Subsidiaries: INGKA Holding
- Endowment: US$36 billion in 2006
- Website: www.ingkafoundation.org//

IKEA ownership chart
Flowchart showing the structure and ownership of IKEA companies. Parent companies are at the top of the chart.
Provides services to | Is the parent of | Provides funding to

The Stichting INGKA Foundation is a Dutch foundation founded in 1982 by Ingvar Kamprad, a Swedish billionaire and founder of IKEA, and his corporate attorney Linnea Walsh. INGKA is one of the largest charitable foundations in the world and used to be one of the largest nonprofit organisations in the world. The name "INGKA" comes from a contraction of Ingvar's name, while stichting is the Dutch language word for foundation. The stated purpose of the foundation is "To promote and support innovation in the field of architectural and interior design"; however, the organization in 2009 expanded its philanthropic agenda towards well-being of children in the developing world, focusing on child poverty, refugee livelihoods and climate change. Since 2009 total giving has exceeded €2 billion.

The foundation contributes funds via the IKEA Foundation which works with the UNHCR. It is one of the seven international entities who support the UNHCR camp office in Kutupalong (Bangladesh) for the Rohingya refugees from Myanmar.

== Overview ==
The foundation owns the private Dutch company INGKA Holding, based in Leiden, which is the holding company that controls 372 of the 432 outlets of IKEA.

In an explanation of IKEA's complex corporate structure, Ingvar Kamprad stated to the authors of a Swedish documentary that tax efficiency was "a natural part of the company's low-cost culture". Sweden had in 1982 very high Inheritance tax for larger fortunes, and the tax on the profit of selling stocks to pay for the tax was added. The foundation also provides an anti-takeover protection scheme for IKEA. The Dutch Tax Service at that time applied the "Institution for General Benefit" (algemeen nut beogende instelling, ANBI) status to the Stichting IKEA Foundation. According to the ANBI register in the Netherlands, Stichting INGKA Foundation lost ANBI status in 2010, but was registered as an ANBI from January 1, 2008, until January 1, 2010. Due to changes in Dutch tax law, Stichting INGKA Foundation does not currently hold ANBI status.

== Giving ==
In 2017, the foundation donated 159 million euros to the IKEA Foundation of which 144 million was subsequently donated.

== Criticisms and reforms ==
In May 2006, The Economist magazine estimated that the parent organization's foundation's endowment was worth US$36 billion, making it the world's wealthiest charity at the time; however, it also stated that the foundation "is at the moment also one of its least generous. The overall set-up of IKEA minimises tax and disclosure, handsomely rewards the founding Kamprad family and makes IKEA immune to a takeover". Following the publication of the Economist article, Ingvar Kamprad went to court in the Netherlands to expand the donor intent of the foundation, whereby a fraction of the endowment would be spent on children in the developing world. Prior to this, the foundation's articles of association limited the foundation's purpose to "innovation in the field of architectural and interior design" and it had given a relatively small amount of its assets to the Lund Institute of Technology.

== See also ==
- List of wealthiest charitable foundations
