= Jonas Kamprad =

Swedish businessman

- Born: Hans Jonas Ingvar Kamprad; March 1966 (age 59); Amhult, Sweden
- Children: 2
- Parent: Ingvar Kamprad

Jonas Kamprad (born March 1966) is a Swedish billionaire based in London. He is the son of IKEA founder Ingvar Kamprad.

== Early life ==
Jonas Kamprad was born in March 1966. He is the second son of IKEA founder Ingvar Kamprad. Kamprad studied industrial and furniture design in École cantonale d'art de Lausanne (ECAL) in Lausanne, Switzerland.

== Career ==
Together with his two brothers, he owns Ikano Group, which manages Ikea's real estate, insurance and financial service businesses.

== Personal life ==
Kamprad is married, with two children, and lives in London, England.
