= Vägen Framåt =

Weekly newspaper in Sweden (1932–1992)

- Type: Weekly newspaper; Bimonthly magazine
- Founder: New Swedish Movement
- Publisher: Riksförbundet Det nya Sverige
- Founded: 1932
- Ceased publication: 1992
- Political alignment: Far-right
- Language: Swedish
- Headquarters: Uppsala; Stockholm; Malmö
- Country: Sweden
- ISSN: 0346-4849
- OCLC number: 924810836

Vägen Framåt (Swedish: The Road Forward) was a weekly newspaper published by the New Swedish Movement, a fascist and corporatist nationalist political movement in Sweden founded by Per Engdahl. The paper was in circulation between 1932 and 1992 with some interruptions.

== History and profile ==
Vägen Framåt was established as a weekly newspaper by the New Swedish Movement in Uppsala in 1932. The founding editor was Per Engdahl. The publisher was Riksförbundet Det nya Sverige based in Uppsala. Vägen Framåt was published in Stockholm in the period 1935-1937 and in Malmö from 1942.

Between 1937 and 1940 Vägen Framåt temporarily ceased publication. One of the editors was Yngve Nordberg, a friend of Per Engdahl. The paper frequently published articles by Per Engdahl who praised Adolf Hitler and Nazi Germany. One of his articles dated 1979 formulated the strategy to be followed by the Swedish fascist movement in future. The newspaper folded in 1992.
