= Action Group of Independent Germans =

Action Group of Independent Germans Aktionsgemeinschaft Unabhängiger Deutscher
- Leader: August Haußleiter (1968–1980); Hermann Schwann (1965–1968)
- Founders: August Haußleiter; Hjalmar Schacht
- Founded: 15 May 1965; 61 years ago
- Dissolved: 27 January 1980; 46 years ago
- Preceded by: German Community; German Freedom Party; Association of the German National Assembly
- Merged into: The Greens
- Headquarters: Homberg (Efze)
- Newspaper: Die Unabhängigen
- Ideology: German nationalism Environmentalism; Neutrality
- Colours: Gold

Action Group of Independent Germans (German: Aktionsgemeinschaft Unabhängiger Deutscher, or AUD) was a nationalist-neutralist party in the West Germany. It was founded in May 1965 as a successor of various anti-Nazi nationalist groups and parties in West Germany. By the end of the 1960s, it approached the political demands of the extra-parliamentary opposition (APO), particularly its environmentalism, claiming the title of Germany's first environmentalist party. On 27 April 1980 it would eventually merge into the then-new and still very diverse Greens for which the AUD's long-time leader, August Haußleiter, would end up serving on the federal board.

== History ==
The AUD was founded on 15/16 May 1965 in Homberg (Efze) and brought together "nationalists who generally clearly distanced themselves from the Nazi regime, as well as liberals and pacifists" from the three right-wing nationalist groups German Community (DG), German Freedom Party (DFP) and parts of the Association of the German National Assembly (VDNV) as well as the readership of the newspaper Neue Politik. The reason for the founding of the AUD was the lack of success of nationalist-neutralist parties in the Federal Republic until the early 1960s. The AUD attempted to unite all nationalist-neutralist currents in a broad alliance. In doing so, it rejected the ideology of the National Democratic Party of Germany (NPD) because it seemed to be too backward-looking and too closely aligned with the NSDAP. The AUD was initially largely unsuccessful with this strategy in elections. The party had internal disagreements, some members wanted the inclusion NPD and the German Peace Union (DFU). DFP later withdrew their support for AUD in favour of NPD.

== Notable members ==
- August Haußleiter (1905–1989), nationalist and environmentalist politician as well as journalist. Founding member and leader of the AUD (1968-1980).
- Hjalmar Schacht (1877–1970), economist, banker, and politician who served as the minister of economics of Nazi Germany (1934-1937). Founding member.
- Baldur Springmann (1912–2003), Ex-Nazi, environmentalist, and organic farmer. Leader of the AUD state section in Schleswig-Holstein during the 70s.
- Herbert Rusche (1952–2024), LGBT rights activist. Member of the AUD Offenbach am Main district board.
- Joseph Beuys (1921–1986), artist, teacher, and art theorist. Candidate for the AUD in the 1976 federal election.
- Dieter Burgmann (born 1939), engineer, trade unionist, and politician. Leader of the AUD state section in Bavaria.
- Bernd Grimmer (1950–2021), later Alternative for Germany (AfD) member and MdB.

== See also ==
- All-German People's Party
- Bund der Deutschen
- German Peace Union

== Literature ==
- Stöss, Richard. Parteien-Handbuch Band 1: AUD bis EFP - Die Parteien der Bundesrepublik Deutschland 1949-1980. Westdeutscher Verlag. ISBN 3-531-11570-7
