= Karl-Heinz Priester =

German far-right politician (1913–1960)

Karl-Heinz Priester (20 March 1912 – 16 April 1960) was a German far-right political activist. While he played only a minor role in Nazi Germany, Priester became a leading figure on the extreme right in Europe after the Second World War.

== Under the Nazis ==
A native of Hesse-Nassau, Priester joined the regiment of the Hitler Youth that covered the south of the territory in 1932. He went on to serve as head of propaganda for the Hitler Youth. He also acted as executive director of Kraft durch Freude from 1935 to 1939.

Following the outbreak of the Second World War Priester applied to join the Schutzstaffel but was rejected and instead enlisted in the Luftwaffe as a war correspondent. Subsequently switching to the army as a lieutenant, he ended the war as a liaison officer for the Waffen SS. During the course of his war service he was seriously injured.

== Post-war ==
Priester was interned by the American occupation forces from 1946 to 1948. When released he joined the National Democratic Party, a rightist party led by Heinrich Leuchtgens and mainly active in Wiesbaden (and distinct from the later National Democratic Party of Germany). Act as the group's propagandist, he helped to ensure that the group secured local representation. However Priester's neo-Nazi tendencies put him at odds with the more conservative leadership and in December 1949 his wing broke away. This group, largely based in Hesse, linked up with the Fatherland Union of Karl Freitenhansl to form a new party, the Nationaldemokratische Reichs-Partei (NDRP). The new group co-operated with the Socialist Reich Party for a time but merger discussions floundered as Priester became isolated from his colleagues due to his heavy-handed style of leadership. Eventually Priester was expelled from the NDRP in December 1950, establishing his own German Social Movement in March of the following year.

Priester was keen to develop supranational co-operation between extreme right groups and to this end he was central to the organisation of a conference in Rome from 22–25 October 1950 at which representatives of several such movements were in attendance. He was also in attendance at the 1951 conference in Malmö that saw the foundation of the European Social Movement (ESM). Priester initially had problems attending after his visa was refused (and according to Philip Rees he did not actually attend the event because of this) but ultimately he was appointed to the four man council of leadership alongside chairman Per Engdahl, Maurice Bardèche and Augusto De Marsanich. Priester was an enthusiastic supporter of the idea of a united Europe although his co-operation with another leading light of that position, Oswald Mosley, was hamstrung by the stormy nature of their personal relations. A strong opponent of democracy, he would later move to have the Italian Social Movement expelled from the ESM due to their willingness to co-operate with more mainstream right-wing parties in Italy.

Priester was a featured essayist for Nation Europa from the journal's foundation in 1951 and was a close ally of its founder Arthur Ehrhardt. Working closely with Otto Skorzeny, Priester attempted to utilise the magazine as a rallying point for his dream of European unity and traveled widely promoting this aim, including meetings in London with his rival Mosley. The two even worked together on their shared aim of exporting the idea to South Africa, where Mosley had already secured an alliance with former cabinet minister Oswald Pirow. He was also a close collaborator of René Binet, helping him to develop his journal La Sentinelle.

Priester's involvement in domestic politics waned as he came to concentrate his efforts on publishing and the development of the international movement. The German Community of August Haußleiter temporarily absorbed his German Social Movement in 1952, with both becoming part of the Nationale Sammlung the following year. He would subsequently chair a meeting at Weisbaden where he made a final attempt to unite the various competing far right groups in Germany but this was unsuccessful.

== Publishing ==
He controlled his own publishing house, the Verlag Karl-Heinz Priester, which produced the works of a number of authors including Paul Rassinier. The Verlag also published Advance to Barbarism, an attack on the validity of the Nuremberg Trials by British Union of Fascists and Union Movement activist F.J.P. Veale, with an introduction written by another prominent critic of the trials Maurice Hankey, 1st Baron Hankey.
