= Paul van Tienen =

Dutch Nazi (1921–1995)

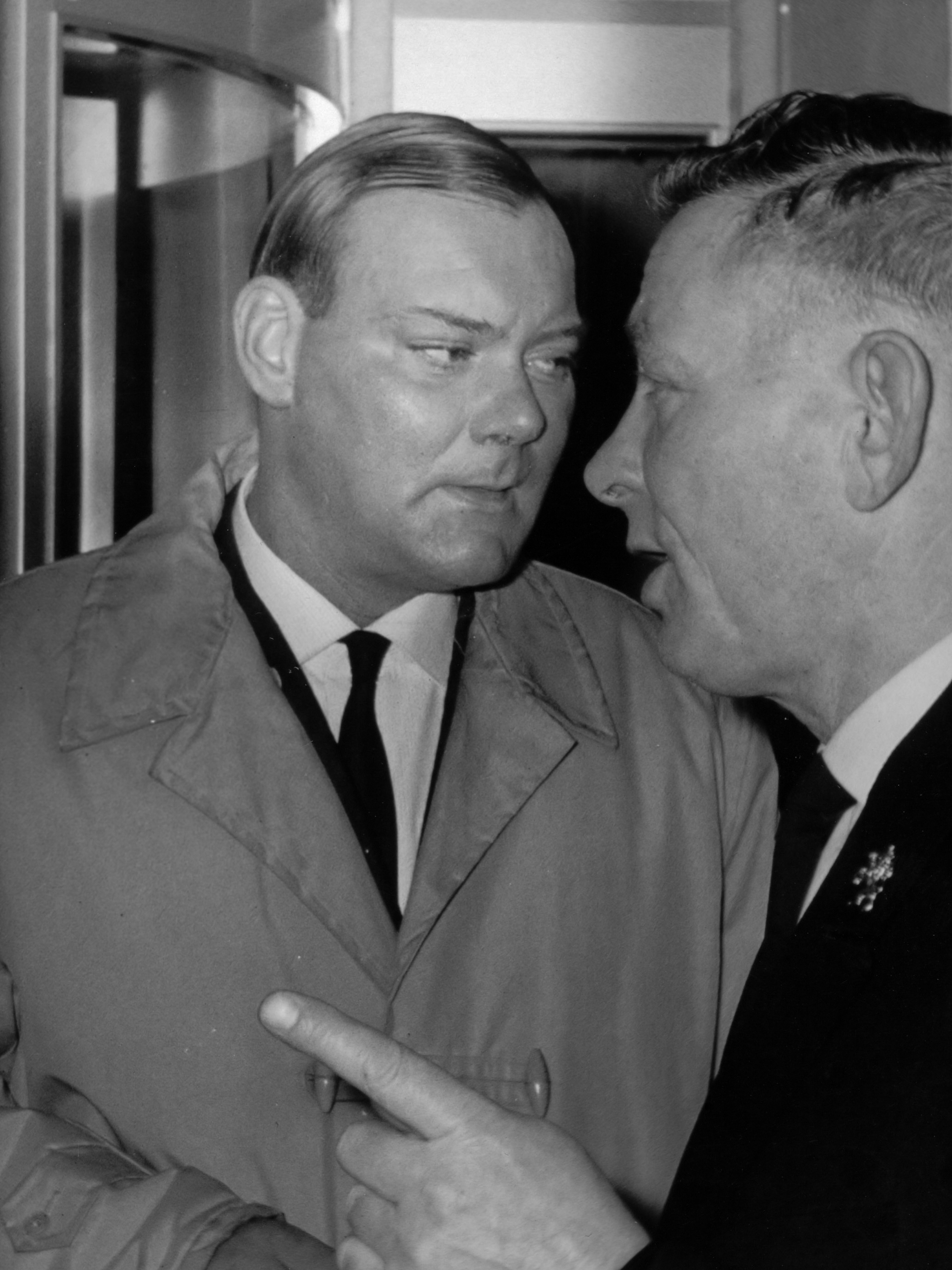
Van Tienen (left) in 1964

Paul van Tienen (10 January 1921 – 1995 probably in La Manga del Mar Menor, Murcia, Spain) was a Dutch Nazi during World War II and a far-right politician after the war, convicted at least twice for his political activities.

== Biography ==
=== Until 1945 ===
Born in Yogyakarta, Van Tienen joined the Waffen-SS during World War II and became an Untersturmführer. He was active on the Eastern Front in a propaganda detachment.

=== After the war ===
After the war, Van Tienen continued his political activism and became involved with the European Social Movement of Per Engdahl, whom he cited as a political ally in 1953. Unlike many of his collaborating colleagues he never lost his right to vote or his Dutch citizenship, since he was a minor when he joined the SS. A member of the Dutch organization of former collaborators Stichting Oud Politieke Delinquenten ("Foundation of Former Political Delinquents"), he went on to organize a political party associated with that organization, the National European Social Movement, which was dissolved by the Supreme Court of the Netherlands in 1954/1955. His activities with the NESB had led to an arrest in 1953, when he and Jan Wolthuis were sentenced to two months' imprisonment for running an organization considered a successor to the NSB.

Throughout the 1950s, Van Tienen, a bookseller in Utrecht, published revisionist articles in an irregularly appearing periodical, the Nederlands Archief der Conservatieve Revolutie ("Dutch Archive of the Conservative Revolution"). He also operated a mail-order book-selling business and was arrested and convicted in 1965 of insulting a segment of the population since he sold antisemitic literature. He was sentenced to three months imprisonment and three months of probation. Van Tienen had lost his passport due to his SS involvement and fled to Spain, likely with false papers, where he operated a penny arcade, and died sometime in 1995.
