= Jan Wolthuis =

Dutch Nazi collaborator and far-right politician

- Born: February 27, 1903; Groningen, Netherlands
- Died: March 16, 1983 (aged 80)
- Education: University of Groningen
- Political party: Nationaal Europese Sociale Beweging (1953–1955); National Socialist Movement in the Netherlands (1933–1945)

Jan Aksel Wolthuis (27 February 1903 – 16 March 1983), a lawyer by training, was a Dutch Nazi who collaborated with the German occupiers during World War II and after the war was active in far-right politics.

== Biography ==
=== Until 1945 ===
Born in Groningen, Wolthuis studied law at the University of Groningen. In 1933 he joined Anton Mussert's National Socialist Movement in the Netherlands, or NSB. In the years before 1940 he fulfilled a number of offices in the NSB at the local level, and during the war proved himself a fanatical Nazi, adhering to the ideology of Meinoud Rost van Tonningen. He received an appointment as "justice of the peace" in Arnhem, essentially a political office occupied by NSB members and intended to handle civil infractions involving NSB members. In addition, the justice of the peace in Arnhem was also a justice of the economy, a special position introduced in 1941 to punish infractions in the domestic economy, particularly in relation to food rationing and price control. Wolthuis made no secret of his allegiance; he was known to occasionally wear his NSB uniform under his robes. The cases he handled that were reported on in the papers were minor: he sentenced a chaplain to two months in jail for an unauthorized fundraiser, and presided over a case in which a citizen (a member of the NSB) complained that his bicycle had been requisitioned without a proper notification and subsequently insulted the mayor, claiming he was responsible for the theft of his bicycle.

=== After the war ===
After the war he was jailed for four years and was banned from working in the legal and judicial professions. An unrepentant ideologue, he corresponded regularly with Arnold Meijer, the Catholic fascist who had been convicted as a collaborator and was released from jail in 1948. An attempt to organize a celebration for Dutch SSers who were killed in the war, a "Celebration of Heroes," was unsuccessful. In the 1950s, he co-founded (with fellow Waffen-SS volunteer and collaborator Jan Hartman) the Stichting Oud Politieke Delinquenten. This was the first and largest of Dutch organizations of convicted collaborators; an attempt at resurrecting the NSB under the transparent moniker NESB, or Nationaal Europese Sociale Beweging, was unsuccessful. His activities with the NESB led to an arrest in 1953, when he and Paul van Tienen were sentenced to two months' imprisonment for running an organization considered a successor to the NSB.

After the NESB was dismantled Wolthuis ceased having any importance in far-right parties, though he remained involved with organizations that supported veterans of the Eastern Front. With Hartman, he played a never fully explained part in the 1952 escape of seven convicted war criminals from the Koepelgevangenis in Breda, including Klaas Carel Faber.
