= August Haußleiter =

German politician and journalist (1905–1989)

- Born: 5 January 1905; Nuremberg, Kingdom of Bavaria, German Empire
- Died: 8 July 1989; Munich, Bavaria, West Germany
- Other name: Karl Konstantin
- Occupations: Politician; Journalist
- Political party: DVP (before 1933); Christian Social Union in Bavaria (1946–1949); DG (1949–1965); AUD (1965–1979); The Greens (1980–1989)
- Spouse: Renate Malluche (1963)
- Children: 4

August Haußleiter (5 January 1905 – 8 July 1989) was a German politician and journalist. After his exclusion from the Bavarian Christian Social Union in 1949 he spent three decades as a right-wing political activist, on many occasions positioned beyond the frontiers of West Germany's consensual political mainstream. During the 1980s he remained politically active, but now as a somewhat unconventional member of the German Green party. He is also the mentor of the Finnish Greens.

He is sometimes identified by the pseudonym under which he occasionally wrote, as Karl Konstantin.

== Life ==
=== Before 1945 ===
Relatively little is known for certain about Haußleiter's life before 1945. Much of what is known comes from what Haußleiter himself wrote, or from party publications emanating from the German Community, the right-wing political movement with which he was associated in the 1950s, and not all of this can be agreed to more neutral sources. Haußleiter himself also managed to disseminate differing versions of his past.

August Haußleiter was the son of a Lutheran minister. He was born and grew up in Nuremberg. According to his own statements, he lost his parents at a young age and grew up as an orphan. He became politically aware early on, and while still at secondary school joined "national defence organisations". At the age of 15 he was arrested by police for the first time, while participating in a major political confrontation. Much later, in 1957, Haußleiter himself would write that during the quasi-civil war that persisted following the upheavals of 1918-1919 his own political focus remained unclear. He saw the so-called German Day mass marches of 1920–1922 in North Bavaria as a manifestation of a wider evolving nationalist mood, and he would only slowly take to heart the lessons of the 9 November 1923 confrontation, remembered in history as the Hitler-Ludendorff Putsch. "You must retain a sober judgement and correctly evaluate the strengths of the enemy if you want to secure lasting results in the political struggle" (" Man muss nüchtern bleiben, und man muss die Feindstärke richtig beurteilen, wenn man dauernde Ergebnisse im politischen Kampfe erzielen will"). The commentators Martin A. Lee and Richard Stöss appear both to assume that Haußleiter was a participant in the (failed) Hitler-Ludendorff Putsch. Others, including Silke Mende, are content to infer from sources including Haußleiter's own autobiographical writings of 1957, that in 1923 Haußleiter was still "looking for nationalistic groups to join" (...er schon früh "Anschluss an nationalistische Gruppen suchte").

After passing his school final exams (Abitur) he studied theology and philosophy locally at Erlangen University, while undertaking paid work to fund his studies. In 1924 he became a member of the Onoldia student fraternity. Various sources indicate that before 1933 Haußleiter was a member of the German People's Party.

From 1928 Haußleiter worked as an economics and politics editor with the Fränkische Kurier (newspaper). The hitherto conservative newspaper had transformed itself since 1918 into an anti-republican, sometimes anti-Semitic "nationalist" publication, and thereby indirectly helped to prepare the way for National Socialism, even if before 1933 it found itself condemned by the Nazis as a mouthpiece for Chancellor von Papen (als "Papen-Blatt"). Haußleiter remained with the Kurier for another seven years following the savage regime change of 1933, a period during which Nazi criticism of the publication became infrequent, although as the Nazi government struggled to tame opposition from the churches they continued to criticise the Kurier's pro-church stance ("kirchenfreundliche Haltung"). Richard Stöss asserts that during his time with the Kurier, Haußleiter wrote a succession of articles justifying Nazi policies including those involving anti-Semitism.

In 1940 August Haußleiter had a major altercation with Julius Streicher. Streicher, who lived in Nuremberg, was both the local Gauleiter and a top Nazi. The result of the altercation was that in 1940 August Haußleiter was removed from the Fränkische Kurier. There is a suggestion, which may have originated with Haußleiter himself, that it was a few years earlier that Haußleiter became the involuntary cause of a ban on art criticism imposed by the Nazi Propaganda Minister.

War had broken out the previous year, and later in 1940 Haußleiter was conscripted into the army. He spent the rest of the war employed in the 13th Army Corps. In 1942 he was badly wounded on the Russian Front. Later the same year he published a book, entitled ""An der mittleren Ostfront"" about the war on the Russian Front. In the context of Haußleiter's post-war political career this book would attract far more critical attention than would have seemed likely at the time of its publication. Later he was switched to the Western front, ending up in 1945 as a US prisoner of war.

=== After 1945 ===
Haußleiter was released from the prisoner-of-war camp later in 1945 and took a teaching job at a school in Neudrossenfeld, a small town between Nuremberg and Erfurt. In 1946, at nearby Kulmbach, he was one of the co-founders of the Bavarian Christian Social Union (Christlich-Soziale Union in Bayern) party. The Christian Social Union was a regional political party for Bavaria, an overwhelmingly Roman Catholic state within Germany. The district around Nuremberg was a protestant enclave within Bavaria, however, and Haußleiter's own protestant provenance was an important part of broadening the party's coverage beyond Bavaria's catholic majority, although his protestantism would also help to make Haußleiter in some respects an outsider. He nevertheless represented a long standing liberal conservative and federalist tradition as well as Bavaria's protestant minority within the Christian Social Union. In 1946 he became a Christian Social Union member of the Bavarian state parliament (Landtag) and of the important Landtag committee for drawing up the new Bavarian constitution, party positions which he retained till his forced resignation from the Christian Social Union in 1949.

In 1947 Haußleiter was temporarily deprived of his party endorsement by means of a majority vote of Christian Social Union members in the Bavarian state legislature (Landtag). It was stated that this was because his writings, in particular his 1942 book "An der mittleren Ostfront" (1942), were excessively militaristic in tone, and implied support for Nazi ideology. Haußleiter appealed to the Bavarian Constitutional Court, and after winning his case before the arbitration board, he was successful in recovering the party mandate on 16 January 1948. A few weeks later, on 29 February 1948, Haußleiter was elected a deputy chairman of the Christian Social Union.

The suspicion was allowed to grow that the underlying cause of the problems Haußleiter faced within the Christian Social Union arose because he was a member of Bavaria's Protestant minority. The disclosure in 1980 of hitherto confidential documents indicate that a major additional issue was the inclusion of Haußleiter's name on a list of suspected Nazi sympathizers compiled by the intelligence services supporting the US occupation authorities.

Following major internal differences between rival wings of the Christian Social Union in Bavaria, Haußleiter finally resigned from the party in September 1949. By that time, he had been able to prepare the way for an alternative political focus, having been a co-founder at Braunschweig in January 1949 of the German Union, not merely a Bavarian entity but a German one, defined as a cross party non-doctrinaire movement whose objectives included the preparation of a democratic revolution ("Vorbereitung einer demokratischen Revolution"). The programme of the German Union was compiled by Haußleiter with Gerhard Krüger, a former Nazi party official who before the end of the year left the German Union in order to join the more overtly extremist Socialist Reich Party. With Ferdinand Zimmermann, another fellow journalist, whose backing for the Nazi regime before 1945 appears to have been less nuanced than his own, Haußleiter produced the German Union's weekly political journal, "Die deutsche Wirklichkeit" ("The German Reality"). At the end of 1949 the German Union evolved/merged into the German Community (DG), with Haußleiter a leading spokesman of what had in effect become another German political party.

As a leading DG figure in Bavaria, August Haußleiter advocated a merger for Bavarian political purposes with the All-German Bloc/League of Expellees and Deprived of Rights, a grouping representing the millions of victims of ethnic cleansing whose former homes had ended up on the wrong side of Germany's new eastern frontier, and many of whom had ended up as refugees in Bavaria. A merger and cooperation agreement between the DG and the BHE were duly completed for the Bavarian state election of 10 October 1950, following which the DG achieved six seats in the Bavarian state legislature (Landtag). Haußleiter was one of the six, and led the DG group in the Landtag between 1950 and 1952.

During 1952 the little DG grouping in the Landtag splintered as members drifted off to other parties, while the alliance with the BHE also came to an end as refugees made new lives and moved on politically and, sometimes, geographically. The two remaining DG Landtag members were August Haußleiter and the doctor-pediatrician Renate Malluche, whom he would later marry. The two of them continued to sit in the Bavarian Landtag, now without any party affiliation, for more than another two years, from April 1952 till December 1954.

Anticipating (correctly) the subsequent outlawing of the Socialist Reich Party (SRP), on 4 October 1952 Haußleiter instigated a meeting with Karl-Heinz Priester, a right-wing extremist who had recently established his own Deutsch-Soziale Bewegung (literally "German Social Movement"). Their purpose was to discuss how they might, along with Werner Boll of the Deutsche Reichspartei (German National Party) work together to pick up SRP activists after their own party had been banned (as indeed it was in 1952, followed by the West German Communist Party in 1956). Haußleiter further burnished his credentials as a right-wing extremist during this period with his contributions to the right-wing newspaper, Nation Europa, frequently identified as a pro-Nazi publication.

For the West German General Election of 1953 Haußleiter organised an electoral alliance of extreme right wing parties into a grouping named the Dachverband der Nationalen Sammlung (DNS) in which the principal players were himself, Karl-Heinz Priester and Karl Meißner (Deutscher Block). The grouping's message failed to resonate with voters, however, and it won just 0.3% of the popular vote.

In 1965 Haußleiter was persuaded by Hermann Schwann to become a founding member of the Action Group of Independent Germans (AUD), a nationalist anti-war political grouping which in the next few years became increasingly focused on environmental issues, and in the end, in 1979, merged into the embryonic forerunner of the German Green party. After 1967 he also produced the AUD's party newspaper, "Die Unabhängigen" ("The Independents").

The AUD failed to gain traction with the German electorate, and in preparation for the European Parliament election of 1979 it joined together with various other fringe political groupings, most of them recently emerged as part of the surge in environmental awareness and concern that was a feature of the 1970s in West Germany. They presented themselves initially as a "joint list" under the name "Sonstige politische Vereinigung Die Grünen". Haußleiter produced a newspaper for the political grouping which some suggested was simply a continuation of the party newspaper he had hitherto been producing for the AUD, but it came with a new name, "Die Grünen" ("The Greens").

He became a spokesman for the new grouping/party, which consciously refused to define itself in terms of "left-right" politics and also, possibly to avoid a public "left-right" split, resisted the idea of electing a single party leader. Haußleiter claimed to have proposed the four pillars of green politics at a congress held in Offenbach in October 1979 to agree a programme for the national party, in order to break a deadlock over economic orientation and non-violence, securing the agreement of the leaders of the right (Herbert Gruhl) and left (Jürgen Reents) factions at the conference.

The German Green Party was formally inaugurated at a congress in Karlsruhe in January 1980, and two months later, at a follow-up party congress held at Saarbrücken, he was elected as one of the spokespersons for the new party, and a member of its collective leadership team. At the age of 75 August Haußleiter was by now a forgotten albeit colourful figure from West Germany's political past. His unexpected appearance as a possible candidate for the job of Chancellor, campaigning on behalf of The Greens against Franz Josef Strauss and Helmut Schmidt in the forthcoming general election, attracted a surge in public interest, however. Press attention included a hitherto unfamiliar level of interest in Haußleiter's erratic political career to date, on his wartime writings, and on some of his more controversial political fellow travelers since 1945.

On 24 April 1980 the political television magazine programme, Monitor broadcast a lengthy feature on Haußleiter, referring to his war diary and including footage from the 1957 party conference of the DG. Various Haußleiter quotations from the early 1950s were also included, and the programme concluded that Haußleiter was really a Nazi. Haußleiter himself initially dismissed this as an unexpected politically motivated attack on the new party, and part of the normal political smear culture. Nevertheless, following consultation with other members of the party leadership, at the next party conference, held at Dortmund in June 1980 to prepare for the October general election, he resigned from his high-profile position. His successor was Dieter Burgmann, a less flamboyant performer, who also came from the formerly AUD wing of the party, but was too young to have published anything during the war.

1980 did not mark the end of August Haußleiter's political career in The Green Party. He continued to produce the party's weekly newspaper. In 1986 he was back as a member of the Bavarian state parliament (Landtag), but he resigned in 1987 on health grounds.

== Personal life ==
August Haußleiter married the doctor turned politician Renate Malluche at a Munich registry office in 1963. He was the father of four recorded children.
