= Herbert Rusche =

German politician (1952–2024)

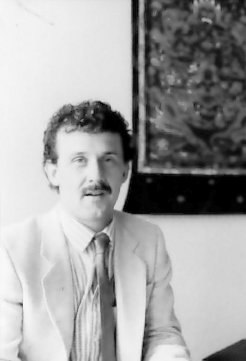

Member of the Bundestag
- In office 1985–1987

Personal details
- Born: 6 May 1952 Bad Neuenahr-Ahrweiler, Rhineland-Palatinate, West Germany
- Died: 22 December 2024 (aged 72) Frankfurt am Main, Germany
- Party: Pirates (2009–2024)
- Other political affiliations: The Greens (1980-2009); AUD (until 1980)

Herbert Ludwig Rusche (6 May 1952 – 22 December 2024) was a German politician and LGBTQ activist.

== Background ==
Rusche was born in Bad Neuenahr-Ahrweiler, Rhineland-Palatinate on 6 May 1952. In his childhood, he lived in three cities. After his schooling, he lived in Kaiserslautern, Heidelberg, Berlin, Hamburg, Offenbach am Main and Frankfurt am Main. Rusche left the Protestant Church in 1970 and became a Buddhist in 1977. In 1977 he also opened the first health food store in Offenbach with a friend. In the 1990s he was self-employed with a telecommunication business. He encountered severe health issues and retired permanently disabled in 2004. Rusche died in Frankfurt am Main on 22 December 2024, at the age of 72.

== Work as politician ==
Rusche was openly gay from 1970. He, with some other friends, founded the organisation Homo Heidelbergensis in 1972, the first gay group in Heidelberg. In 1973 Rusche became a member of the organisation Homosexuelle Aktion Westberlin (HAW). Later he worked in Frankfurt as an activist with Anderes Ufer. He then became a member in Action Group of Independent Germans in Offenbach/Frankfurt and also became a member of the Green List Hessen (GLH). In 1978 Rusche he was a GLH candidate for the parliament of Hesse, but lost with the GLH only getting 1.1% of the vote.

Later Rusche became a founding member of Sonstige politische Vereinigung DIE GRÜNEN and of the party Die GRÜNEN. Rusche was Landesgeschäftsführer of the Greens in Hesse. In 1982 the party won 8.6% of the vote in Hesse and the party was in parliament in Hesse (Hessischer Landtag) for the first time. The Green party later also won in federal elections and became a member of the Bundestag for the first time. Rusche was a member of the Bundestag from 1985 to 1987.

During his time in Bundestag, Rusche, who was openly gay, worked for the equalizing of the age of consent, AIDS causes, and financial help for people with AIDS. He and Petra Kelly worked on the situation in Tibet. After he left the Bundestag, Rusche worked for AIDS organisations and for Homosexuelle Selbsthilfe. In 2001, Rusche left The Greens because of the party's political decision on Kosovo. In 2003 he became a member of the new LGBT organisation Wissenschaftlich-humanitäres Komitee (whk) in Hesse. From 2004 Rusche was a delegate of Buddhistische Gemeinschaft within the Deutsche Buddhistische Union (DBU). He became one of the members of the "Rat" (board of directors) of the DBU in early 2008. On 24 August 2009, he joined the Hesse chapter of the German Pirate Party.
