= The BOMA Project =

BOMA.NGO, Inc.
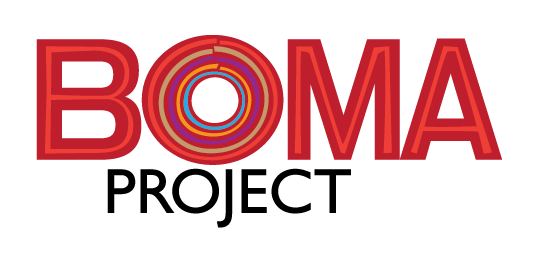
- Founded: 2005; 21 years ago
- Founders: Kathleen Colson, Ahmed 'Kura' Omar
- Type: 501(c)(3) nonprofit
- Location: Manchester Center, Vermont Nanyuki, Kenya
- Area Served: Africa
- Focus: Poverty graduation in rural Kenya
- Website: boma.ngo

BOMA is a U.S. nonprofit organization and Kenyan NGO that works to provide poor women living in the arid and semi-arid lands of Northern Kenya with the educational, financial, and technological resources to lift themselves out of poverty. Its mission is to "empower women in the drylands of Africa to establish sustainable livelihoods, build resilient families, graduate from extreme poverty and catalyze change in their rural communities."

Since 2009, The BOMA Project claims to have aided 203,114 participants in starting new businesses and supported their 1,015,570 household members, also reporting their participants' increased ability to afford food, school fees, and medical care. It aims to reach 3 million women and children by 2027.

== History ==
In 2005, The Boma Project was founded by Kathleen Colson after she observed the exacerbating effects of climate change on poverty in Northern Kenya and proceeded to travel across the region with Ahmed "Kura" Omar to develop the Rural Entrepreneur Access Project (REAP).

== Program ==
The Rural Entrepreneur Access Project (REAP) is BOMA's two-year poverty graduation program, which uses a similar approach to a graduation model performed in six countries that was mostly considered by The New York Times as "enormously successful." This program is implemented in the Marsabit and Samburu counties of Northern Kenya where the poverty rate was 71% in 2016 (25.8% higher than the national poverty rate) and where a series of climate change-induced droughts have occurred since 1992, culminating in the Kenyan government's declaration of a national drought emergency in February 2017. As a result, the livelihoods of local pastoral communities (which largely depend on livestock) have been severely affected, leaving many in extreme poverty and food insecurity. REAP aims to empower the women of these vulnerable communities by helping them start sustainable businesses and establish savings groups to beat poverty and build resiliency against social, economic and climate shocks.

REAP consists of six steps

1. Targeting communities: Field officers and community members identify the poorest women to participate in the program.
2. Mentoring: BOMA mentors help participants launch three-women business groups and provide support for a duration of two years.
3. Cash transfer: Each woman is given seed capital to set up their enterprises.
4. Financial, life skills, and human rights training: Participants are trained in basic economic concepts and skills in financial management, family planning, and household decision-making.
5. Savings: Participants join savings associations (made from multiple business groups) to gain access to credit.
6. Financial Inclusion: BOMA helps participants open bank accounts and provide them with mobile phones to access M-PESA, a Kenyan mobile money transfer system.

In 2013, the BOMA Project was a recipient of the UNFCCC's Momentum for Change Lighthouse Activity Award. In 2015, The Boma Project passed ImpactMatters' impact audit. The Boma Project currently holds a Platinum rating on Guidestar.

== Results ==
According to a 2016 survey, BOMA participants saw their monthly incomes increase by 147%, their savings increased by 1,400%, and the number of children going to bed hungry declined by 63%. In addition, 92% of women graduated from extreme poverty and 97% of BOMA businesses are still in operation after a year.

== Funding ==
The BOMA Project is funded by individual donors, foundations, and government agencies. Major donors include Aid for Africa, the Bill & Melinda Gates Foundation, Boeing, IKEA Foundation, Cartier Philanthropy, Bohemian Foundation, Feed the Future Innovation Lab for Assets and Market Access, International Fund for Agricultural Development, the Mastercard Foundation, the Montpelier Foundation, the Mulago Foundation, the Peery Foundation, the Planet Wheeler Foundation, the Skees Family Foundation, the UK Department for International Development, the United States Agency for International Development, and the Vibrant Village Foundation.
