= German Community =

German Community Deutsche Gemeinschaft
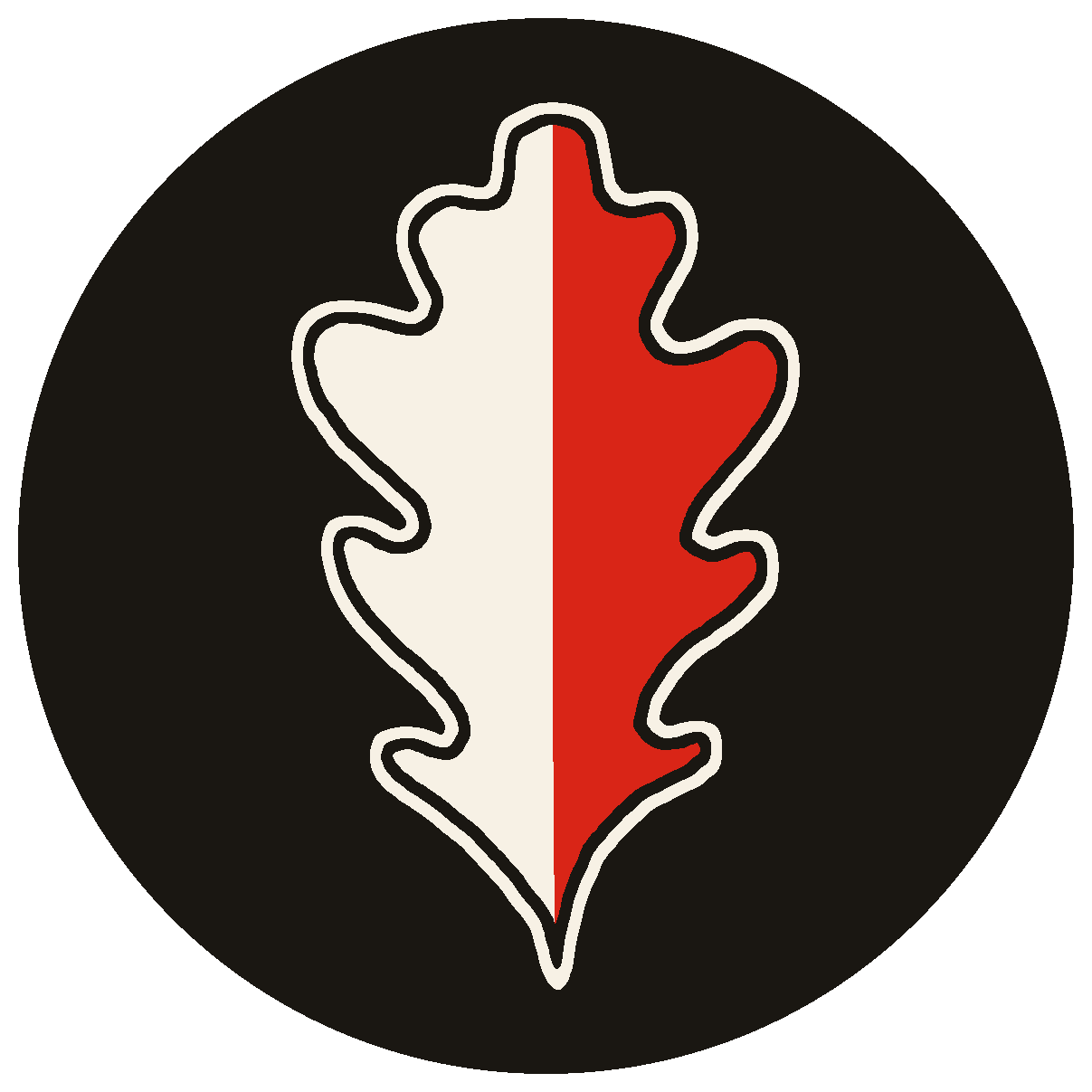
- Leader: August Haußleiter (1952–1965); Kurt Graebe (1950–1952)
- Founded: 4 December 1949; 76 years ago
- Registered: 19 December 1949; 76 years ago
- Dissolved: 15 April 1965; 61 years ago
- Preceded by: German Union
- Merged into: Action Group of Independent Germans
- Newspaper: Deutsche Gemeinschaft
- Youth wing: Young German Community
- Membership (1963): 2,000
- Ideology: German nationalism Volksgemeinschaft; Anti-militarism; Revanchism; Neutrality
- Political position: Far-right
- Colours: Black

The German Community (German: Deutsche Gemeinschaft), short-form: DG, was a nationalist-neutralist political party in the Federal Republic of Germany that existed between 1949 and 1965 when it merged into the Action Group of Independent Germans (AUD). The party was represented in two state legislatures though electoral lists with the All-German Bloc/League of Expellees and Deprived of Rights (GB/BHE) for one legislative period each. The party was primarily active in southern Germany.

== History ==
Founded on 4 December 1949, the German Community succeeded the German Union of August Haußleiter, a political organization that explicitly opposed both representative democracy and the Nazi-system in favour of a "true Volksgemeinschaft", while advocating for a unified Germany in alliance with France, independent from both the United States and the Soviet Union. Several smaller, mainly expelle, groups were also involved in the foundation of the party. The first party leader was Kurt Graebe, who served in the office from 1950 to 1952, when he was replaced by August Haußleiter who led the party until its dissolution.

The main propaganda organ of the German Community was a newspaper of the same name, Deutsche Gemeinschaft, that was published in Munich between 1951 and 1979 (then as the newspaper of the AUD, later renamed to Die Unabhängigen). By 1963, up to 10,000 copies were distributed per edition.

Since the 1950 Bavarian state election up until 1954, the party was represented in the Bavarian state parliament through an electoral alliance with the All-German Bloc/League of Expellees and Deprived of Rights (GB/BHE), being awarded six of the 26 seats won by the alliance, with August Haußleiter serving as the DG-faction leader in parliament. A similar electoral success, though the same constellation, was achieved in Württemberg-Baden, where the alliance, this time as a unified parliamentary faction, elected during the 1950 Württemberg-Baden state election, held 16 seats. After losing all their seats in the 1954 Bavarian state election, the German Community decided not to ever enter into alliance with other political parties, a promise which it held until 1965 when it merged into the Action Group of Independent Germans (AUD).

In 1951, a youth wing of the party was founded named 'Young German Community' (German: Junge Deutsche Gemeinschaft, JDG). This initiative was spearheaded by Günter Hessler and Herbert Neumann, although the latter would soon leave for the Free Socialist Party, causing the project to come to a standstill.

After the Socialist Reich Party (SRP) was banned in 1952, the German Community attempted to act as a save haven for its former members, hoping to act as a de facto successor organization that could accordingly gain popularity. This attempt however instead lead to the state sections of Rhineland-Palatinate, Hesse, and Lower Saxony being banned and a major organizational setback right before the 1953 West German federal election. This influx of more radical members, as well as the organizational setbacks, forced the German Community into an electoral alliance, named Dachverband der Nationalen Sammlung, with the neo-fascist German Social Movement (DSB) and the German Bloc in order to participate in the 1953 election.

Before 1963 there are no exact numbers, only highly fluctuating estimations, of the party's membership. The first such estimation saw the party's membership at 14,000 in 1951, followed by around 500 in 1953. The membership finally stabilized with official internal numbers in 1963 at around 2,000 paying members and 300 activists.

Viewing its project of an "All-German independence movement" as failed, the German Community participated in the foundation of the Action Group of Independent Germans (AUD), effectively merging into it.

== Ideology ==
Richart Stöss categorized the party as far-right and as standing in the tradition of the conservative revolution, particularly representing an anti-Nazi "new nationalism" conflated with an early form of the German New Right. Their ideas were also described as "radical-petite bourgeoisie" and "social-harmonious".

The party's most important goal was the reunification of Germany, including the eastern territories, as a nation-state independent from both the west and the east as well as the establishment of a social- and economic order that is independent from both capitalism and communism, in opposition to financial speculation as well as communist world revolution, instead striving for a "modern German Socialism". The German Community was a staunch supporter of the independent nation-state, declining ideas of supranational unions and the idea of Europe as a nation, which was popular within the European far-right at the time. It was neutralist and pacifist in its foreign policy, while praising the anti-imperialist fights for national independence in the third world, believing its mission for a free and unified Germany to stand in the same tradition. The party declined the idea of restoring the German Realm.

The German Community believed in a "great reconciliation" between all political groups within Germany, including but not limited to: National Socialists, Liberals, Conservatives, and Marxists as well as between autochthonous and expelled Germans; in an effort for a true Volksgemeinschaft that could resist the divide and conquer strategy of the "old", or bourgeoisie, parties (CDU, SPD, FDP, etc.). Its concept, the 'German renewal movement' (German: Deutsche Erneuerungsbewegung) of the expelled and war victims, was viewed as the natural opposite to the "old" parties who had cooperated with the foreign occupying powers.

Its concept of the state was based on a non-pluralist authoritarian system legitimized though direct democracy and plebiscites wherein the subdivisions of the 'social organism' would possess a right to self-determination within the bounds of the unifying Volksgemeinschaft.

As the party increasingly lost its basis in the expellee community it turned down its economic rhetoric, instead focusing on an image of nationalist opposition.

== Literature ==
- Stöss, Richard. Parteien-Handbuch Band 1: AUD bis EFP - Die Parteien der Bundesrepublik Deutschland 1949-1980. Westdeutscher Verlag. ISBN 3-531-11570-7
