= Bernd Grimmer =

German politician (1950–2021)

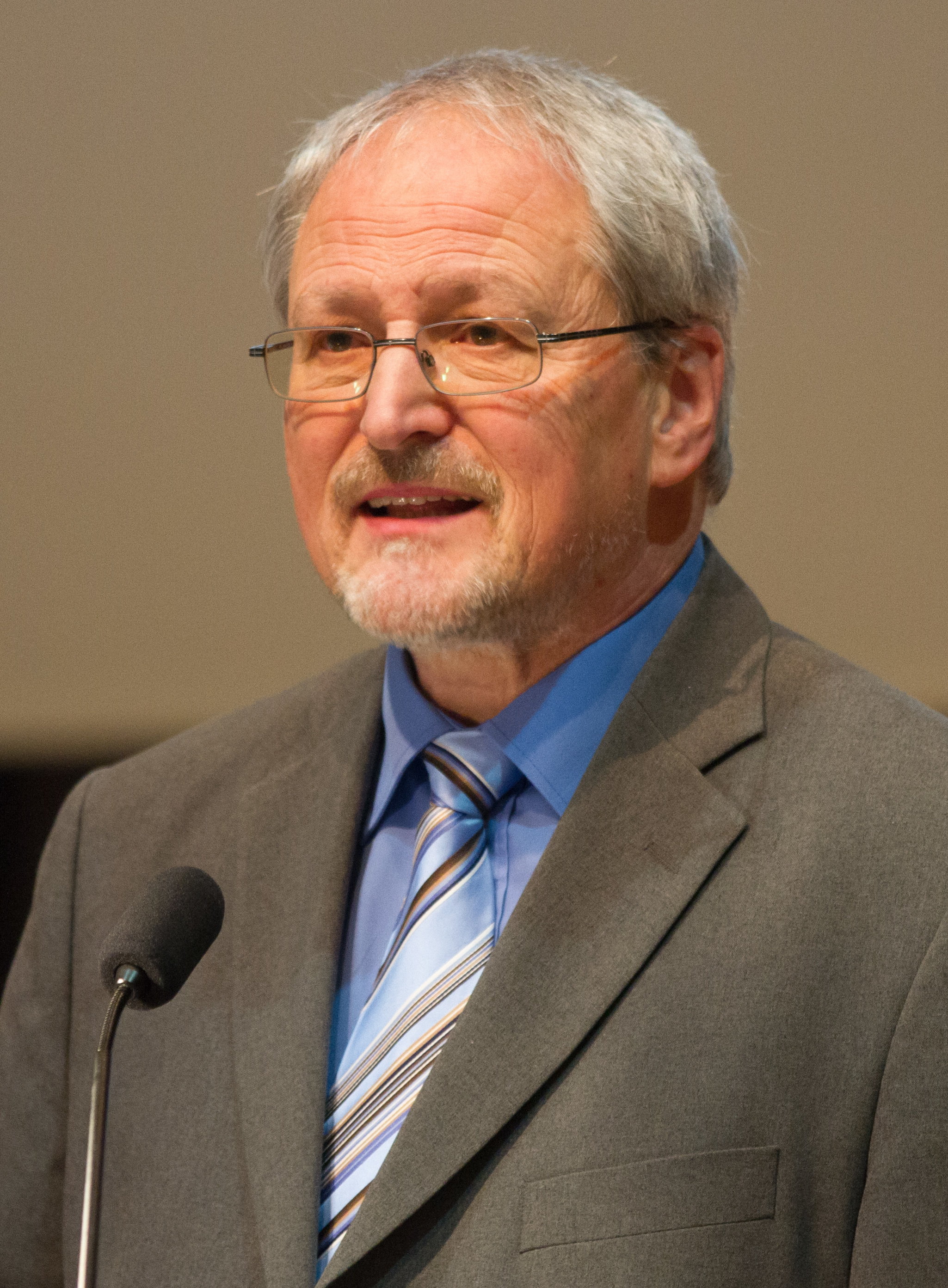
- Grimmer in 2015

Member of the Landtag of Baden-Württemberg
- In office 7 July 2016 – 18 December 2021

Personal details
- Born: 30 March 1950; Pforzheim, West Germany
- Died: 18 December 2021 (aged 71); Germany
- Political party: Alternative for Germany (AfD)

Bernd Grimmer (30 March 1950 – 18 December 2021) was a German politician. A member of Alternative for Germany, he served in the Landtag of Baden-Württemberg from 2016 to 2021.

Grimmer was a critic of COVID-19 vaccination mandates. He died from COVID-19 aged 71 on 18 December 2021, amid the COVID-19 pandemic in Germany.
