= National European Social Movement =

The National European Social Movement (NESB, Dutch: Nationaal Europese Sociale Beweging) was a Dutch neo-Nazi party, founded in 1953 as the political arm of the Stichting Oud Politieke Delinquenten ("Foundation for Political Delinquents"), and disbanded by a ruling of the Dutch Supreme Court in 1955.

Since the Second World War, three parties have been forbidden by court order in the Netherlands. The other two parties are the Nederlandse Volks-Unie (NVU, Dutch People's Union) and Centre Party '86.

The NESB was founded by Paul van Tienen, a former Waffen-SS commandant in the Wiking Division, and Jan Wolthuis, a former NSB member. After the NESB was banned, Van Tienen and Wolthuis were each sentenced to two months in prison for running an organization which was considered a successor to the NSB.
