= European Social Movement =

Neo-fascist European political alliance

- President: Per Engdahl
- Founded: 1951
- Ideology: Neo-fascism; Pan-European nationalism; Corporatism; Anti-communism
- Political position: Far-right

The European Social Movement (German: Europäische soziale Bewegung, ESB) was a neo-fascist European political alliance set up in 1951 to promote pan-European nationalism.

== History ==
The ESB had its origins in the emergence of the Italian Social Movement (MSI), which established contacts with like-minded smaller groups in Europe during the late 1940s, setting up European Study Center and publishing a magazine Europa Unita. On the back of this work they organised a conference in Rome in 1950 which was attended by Oswald Mosley, whose Union Movement was advocating closer European unity with its Europe a Nation policy, representatives of the Falange, allies of Gaston-Armand Amaudruz and other leading figures from the far-right. After submitting plans for a centrally organised Europe a second congress followed in 1951 at Malmö, the home of Per Engdahl, where it was agreed that the ESB would be set up as an alliance to this end. Engdahl was chosen as leader of a four-man council to head up the group, also featuring MSI leader Augusto De Marsanich, French writer Maurice Bardèche and German activist Karl-Heinz Priester.

The ESB suffered early setbacks however, arguing that a war against communism was, at least initially, impractical for a united Europe, whilst some delegates felt that racialism had not been sufficiently underlined as necessary for the new Europe. These problems proved particularly acute for some members of the French Comité National Français, with leading members René Binet and Maurice Bardèche quitting both the French group and the ESB as a whole, before becoming instrumental in the formation of the New European Order.

Continuing its activity despite the split, the ESB encountered difficulties in 1956 when a delegate was invited to the annual conference of the MSI. Following his attendance he recommended a total split from the MSI, whom he accused of being too preoccupied with Italian politics to be of use to pan-Europeanism. With divisions growing and competition from other movements biting the movement had largely become moribund by 1957. Its role was later taken over by the similar National Party of Europe, in a more formalised organisation.

== Ideology ==
The ESB advocated the construction of an anti-communist and corporatist European empire, with common rules on defence and economy, under the leadership of a leader appointed by plebiscite.

== Members ==
Country	Party	Leader
West Germany	German Social Movement	Karl-Heinz Priester
Italy	Italian Social Movement	Augusto De Marsanich
Spain	Falange Española Tradicionalista y de las JONS	Francisco Franco
Sweden	New Swedish Movement	Per Engdahl
United Kingdom	Union Movement	Oswald Mosley
France	French National Committee	René Binet

== See also ==
- National Party of Europe
- New European Order
