= Ingvar Kamprad =

Swedish businessman (1926–2018)

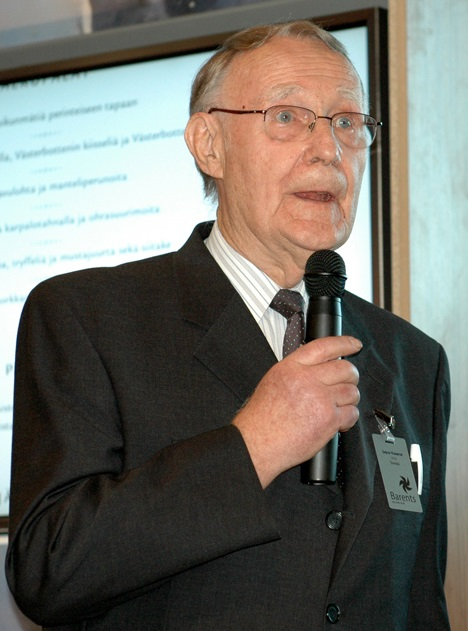
- Kamprad in 2010
- Born: 30 March 1926; Pjätteryd, Sweden
- Died: 27 January 2018 (aged 91); Älmhult, Sweden
- Occupation: Businessman
- Known for: Founder of IKEA
- Spouses: Kerstin Wadling (m. 1950; div. 1960); Margaretha Stennert (m. 1963; died 2011)
- Children: 4

Feodor Ingvar Kamprad (Swedish: [ˈɪ̌ŋːvar ˈkǎmːprad]; 30 March 1926 – 27 January 2018) was a Swedish billionaire businessman who founded IKEA in 1943 and grew it into a multinational retail company that became the world's largest furniture seller in 2008.

== Early life and family ==
Feodor Ingvar Kamprad was born in Pjätteryd (now part of Älmhult Municipality), Kronobergs län, in Småland, Sweden, to Feodor Kamprad (1893–1984) and Berta Linnea Matilda Nilsson (1901–1956). His mother was of Swedish origin, while his father was born in the German Empire and came to Sweden a year after his birth with his parents. Kamprad's paternal grandfather, Achim Erdmann Kamprad, was originally from an aristocratic German family in Altenburger Land in Thuringia, while his paternal grandmother, Franzisca ("Fanny") Glatz, was born in Radonitz (Radonice) in Bohemia in the Austro-Hungarian Empire to a lower-class family. After seeing an ad in a magazine, Achim and Franzisca purchased a timber estate near Agunnaryd, Sweden, where they moved with their young children in the winter of 1896.

The surname Kamprad is a variant of "Kamerade" ("Comrade") and dates back to the 14th century; in the 19th century the Kamprad family had become wealthy estate owners in Thuringia. Achim Kamprad's mother was a distant relative of Paul von Hindenburg. Achim was the younger son of an estate owner and had bought the farm Elmtaryd (presently standardized Älmtaryd) near the small village of Agunnaryd (now part of Ljungby Municipality) in the province of Småland; with 449 hectares (1,110 acres) of land it was the largest farm in the area. He took his own life a few years after Feodor (Ingvar's father) was born, leaving the farm to Franzisca, and with time, to Feodor. From the age of 6 onwards, Ingvar Kamprad lived on the farm with his parents, sister, and grandmother.

Kamprad visited his family's ancestral town in Thuringia and kept in contact with relatives there.

== Career ==
Kamprad started selling matches at the age of five. When he was seven he began travelling further afield on his bicycle to peddle to neighbours. He found he could buy matches in bulk very cheaply in Stockholm, sell them individually at a low price, and still make a profit. From matches he expanded to selling fish, Christmas tree decorations, seeds, and later ballpoint pens and pencils. When Kamprad was 17, his father gave him a cash reward for succeeding in his studies.

Ingvar attended Gothenburg's Handelsinstitut, now part of Hvitfeldtska Gymnasiet, from 1943 to 1945. In 1943, when he was 17 Kamprad founded IKEA at his uncle Ernst's kitchen table. In 1948, Kamprad diversified his portfolio, adding furniture. His business was mostly mail order. The acronym IKEA is made up of the initials of his name (Ingvar Kamprad); plus those of Elmtaryd, the family farm where he was born; and the nearby village of Agunnaryd where he was raised.

In June 2013, Kamprad resigned from the board of Inter IKEA Holding SA and his youngest son Mathias Kamprad replaced Per Ludvigsson as the chairman of the holding company. Following his decision to step down the then-87-year-old founder explained, "I see this as a good time for me to leave the board of Inter IKEA Group. By that we are also taking another step in the generation shift that has been ongoing for some years." Mathias and his two older brothers, who also have leadership roles at IKEA, work on the corporation's overall vision and long-term strategy.

== Net worth and Stichting INGKA Foundation ==
The Dutch-registered Stichting INGKA Foundation is named after Ingvar Kamprad (i.e., ING + KA) which owns INGKA Holding, the parent company for all IKEA stores. Kamprad was chairman of the foundation.

According to an article in the Swedish business weekly Veckans Affärer in 2004, Kamprad was one of the world's wealthiest people. However, the report was based on the assumption that he owned the entire company, an approach both IKEA and the Kamprad family rejected since Kamprad retained little direct ownership in the company, having transferred his interest to the foundation.

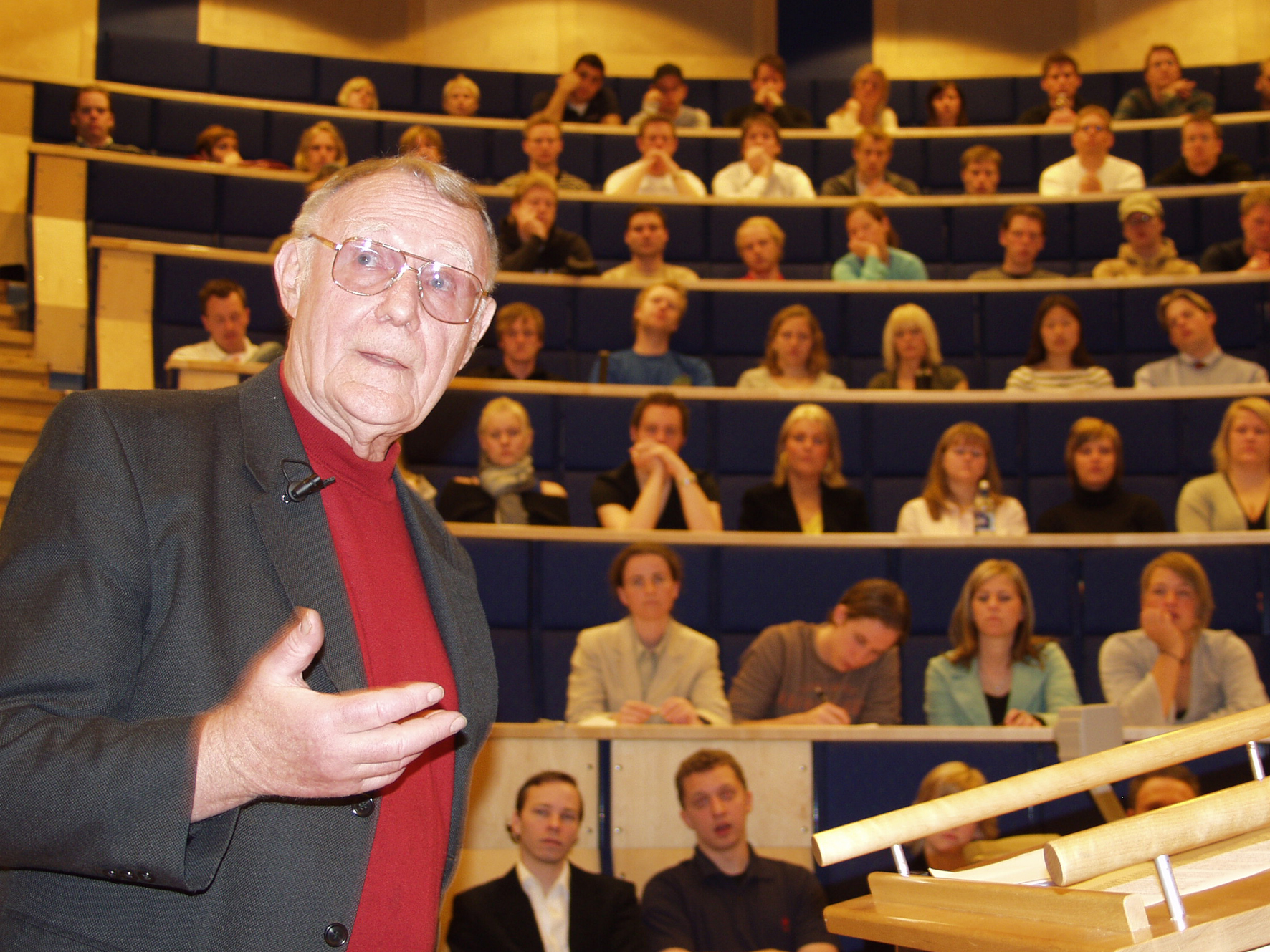
Kamprad in 2004

In March 2010, Forbes magazine estimated Kamprad's fortune at US$23 billion, making him the eleventh richest person in the world. A year later, he fell to 162nd after his lawyers produced documents proving that the foundation he established and heads in Liechtenstein owns IKEA, and that its bylaws bar him and his family from benefiting from its funds. In June 2015, Kamprad was listed as the eighth wealthiest person in the world in the Bloomberg Billionaires Index, with an estimated net worth of $58.7 billion. Forbes reported Kamprad's net worth as of March 2015 to be $3.5 billion.

== Works ==
While generally a private person, Kamprad published a few notable works. He first detailed his philosophies of frugality and simplicity in a manifesto entitled A Testament of a Furniture Dealer in 1976.

Kamprad also worked with Swedish journalist Bertil Torekull on Leading by Design: The IKEA Story. In the autobiographical book, Kamprad further describes his philosophies and the trials and triumphs of the founding of IKEA.

== Fascist involvement ==
In 1994, the personal letters of the Swedish fascist Per Engdahl were made public, posthumously revealing that Kamprad had joined Engdahl's pro-fascist New Swedish Movement (Nysvenska Rörelsen) in 1942, at age 16. Kamprad had been active till as late as September 1945. When he quit the group is unknown, but he remained a friend of Engdahl until the early 1950s.

Kamprad devoted two chapters to his time in Nysvenska Rörelsen in his book Leading by Design: The IKEA Story and, in a 1994 letter to IKEA employees, called his affiliation with the organization the "greatest mistake of my life". Kamprad explained his teenage engagement in New Swedish Movement as being politically influenced by his father and grandmother in Sudet-Germany.

According to a 2011 book by Elisabeth Åsbrink, Kamprad had deeper ties to Nazi organizations than previously acknowledged. Åsbrink wrote that Kamprad had actively recruited members for the Swedish Nazi group Svensk Socialistisk Samling in his youth. Swedish security police took note of his activities in 1943, the same year he established IKEA. Åsbrink alleged that Kamprad's engagement with Nazi and other fascist movements extended past the end of World War II. In a 2010 interview, Kamprad reportedly referred to Engdahl as "a great man".

== Personal life ==
Kamprad and his first wife Kerstin Wadling adopted a daughter, Annika in 1958. Wadling and Kamprad divorced in 1961 with Annika living with her mother.

In the 1960s, Kamprad married his second wife, Margaretha Kamprad-Stennert (1938–2011), whom he met when she was twenty years old. They had three sons: Peter, Jonas and Mathias.

Kamprad lived with his family in Épalinges in Canton Vaud in Switzerland, from 1976 to 2014. He moved back to Småland in Sweden in March 2014, following his wife's passing.

While working with furniture manufacturers in Poland earlier in his career, Kamprad became an alcoholic. In 2004, he said that his drinking was under control, and according to The New York Times, Kamprad "controlled it by drying out three times a year".

According to a 2006 interview, Kamprad was then driving a 1993 Volvo 240, flew economy class, and encouraged IKEA employees to use both sides of a page when writing or printing. He reportedly recycled tea bags and was known to keep the salt and pepper packets in restaurants. Kamprad had also been known to visit IKEA for a "cheap meal", and had a reputation for frugal behaviour; purchasing wrapping paper and presents in post-Christmas sales. The company he founded is still known for the attention it gives to cost-control, operational details and continuous product development; this focus allowed it to lower its prices by an average of 2–3% over the decade to 2010 while continuing its global expansion. Kamprad explains his social philosophy in his Testament of a Furniture Dealer: "It is not only for cost reasons that we avoid the luxury hotels. We don't need flashy cars, impressive titles, uniforms or other status symbols. We rely on our strength and our will!" Kamprad owned a villa in Switzerland, a large country-estate in Sweden and a vineyard in Provence, France. He drove a Porsche for several years.

== Death ==
Kamprad died in his sleep of pneumonia at his home in Småland, Sweden, on 27 January 2018 at the age of 91.

According to his will, half of Kamprad's estate would go to projects in Norrland, the sparsely populated northern half of Sweden. Kamprad reportedly wanted to develop Norrland and make it possible for young people to live there.

The other half of his estate went to his four children. In 2015, it was reported that Kamprad had named his sons as the sole heirs of an entity called the Ikano Group, which is valued at US$1.5 billion, while his adopted daughter, Annika, who lived with him for three years as an infant, was planned to receive about $300,000.

== See also ==
- The World's Billionaires
