= Per Engdahl =

Swedish far-right politician (1909–1994)

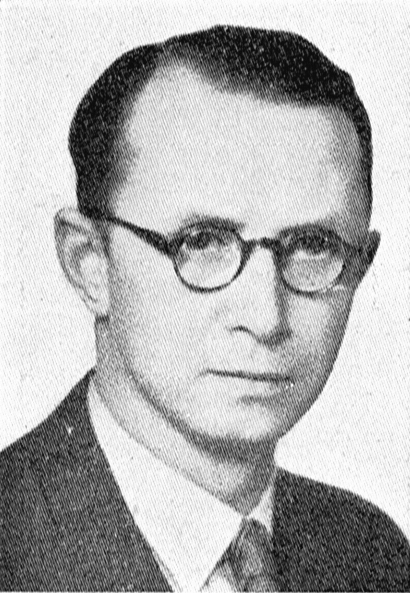
- Per Engdahl in the 1940s
- Born: Per Claes Sven Edvard Engdahl; 25 February 1909; Jönköping, Sweden
- Died: 4 May 1994 (aged 85); Malmö, Sweden
- Political party: New Swedish Movement; National League of Sweden; European Social Movement
- Spouse: Stina Berglund (m. 1937)

Per Claes Sven Edvard Engdahl (25 February 1909 – 4 May 1994) was a leading Swedish far-right politician. He was a leader of Sveriges Fascistiska Kamporganisation (SFKO or Sweden's Fascist Combat Organization), during the 1930s. He led and was involved in various other fascist movements in Sweden and Europe after World War II, though he never had electoral success.

He influenced the founding of far-right group Bevara Sverige Svenskt, which eventually became the modern political party the Sweden Democrats. He has gained posthumous notoriety due to his connections to IKEA founder Ingvar Kamprad.

== Early and personal life ==
=== Family and education ===
Per Claes Sven Edvard Engdahl was born in Jönköping on 25 February 1909. He was the son of Major Sven Edvard Engdahl and Karin Håkansson. He came from a conservative family with a strong military tradition.

Engdahl attended Uppsala University, where he studied philosophy. He also took part in political debates there. He obtained a Bachelor's degree in 1930 and a PhD in 1935.

In 1937, Engdahl married Stina Elna Sofia Berglund. Near the end of his life, he lost most of his eyesight.

=== Literary career and political writing ===
The Karolinska förbundet ("Caroline Society") published their 1930 yearbook in 1931, and Engdahl wrote a section on King Charles XII in it. He argued that Charles XII had a multi-faceted personality and one of the greatest men of all time.

In 1935, Engdahl published a collection of poetry titled "Stormsvept". It was reportedly well-received by major Swedish newspapers. His second poetry collection, Fast vinden ligger mot, was published in 1939. According to the biographical dictionary Svenska män och kvinnor, he was considered to have been one of the most acclaimed writers and speakers in the country until 1941, when he became a leading promoter of Nazi propaganda in Sweden.

Engdahl also used his writing to express his views. Engdahl's 1934 book Sweden in the twentieth century (Swedish: Sverige och det tjugonde århundradet) argued for a racial hierarchy and against race-mixing. The book also defended ongoing purges of German Jews in the administration and universities, with Engdahl describing it as "fully motivated" and a "sound reaction against the influence of the Jews on German cultural life". In his 1940 book Sweden's road through the centuries towards the future (Swedish: Sveriges ödesväg genom seklerna mot framtiden), Engdahl argued for the unification of the Nordic countries under the symbol of a dragon or Viking ship. He downplayed his support for Nazism in his 1945 book Sweden after the war Swedish: Sverige efter kriget, though he later admitted his support for the Nazi concept of a Volksgemeinschaft.

== Fascism ==
=== Early activity ===
Engdahl began his political career while still a student in Uppsala. He became an admirer of Italian fascism and Benito Mussolini's March on Rome in 1922. Sweden's Fascist Combat Organization (Swedish: Sveriges Fascistiska Kamporganisation) (SFKO) was founded in 1926, and Engdahl joined it. From 1928 to 1929, the group began moving towards Nazism and away from Italian fascism. As a result, Engdahl and a few others left and in 1930 founded the New Swedish Federation (Swedish: Nysvenska Förbundet). He advocated a fascist-influenced policy of his own creation which he called nysvenskhet ('new Swedishness'). An attempt was made in 1932 to incorporate his group into the newly formed Nationalsocialistiska folkpartiet of Sven Olov Lindholm (a pro-Nazi party) although Engdahl resisted their overtures.

The coat of arms of Engdahl's National League of Sweden.

As an ideology, nysvenskhet supported a strong Swedish nationalism, corporatism, anti-Semitism and anti-communism as well as a cult of personality around Engdahl himself. It placed an emphasis on racial nationalism, advocated the Madagascar Plan, and called for the replacement of the existing Swedish parliament with a corporatist body elected on an occupational franchise. The policy overtly rejected Nazism, instead looking more towards Benito Mussolini for inspiration while also seeking to unify all groups against democracy, whether they were fascist or not. He wrote the first published Swedish biography on Mussolini.

However, he is also known to have praised Hitler in comments such as: "Today [23 April 1944], we can only salute Adolf Hitler as God's chosen savior of Europe" Nonetheless Engdahl also frequently claimed that he followed neither man, arguing that his ideology was purely Swedish in nature, and as such he claimed his inspirations to be Sven Hedin, Adrian Molin and Rudolf Kjellén.

=== World War II ===
Engdahl founded his own group, Riksförbundet Det nya Sverige, in 1937. Before long he merged this group into the pro-Nazi National League of Sweden, becoming deputy leader of this organisation. Adopting a policy which he described as nysvenskhet ('new Swedishness') he split from this group in 1941 to lead his own Nysvenska Rörelsen which continued to strongly support the Nazis.

Before the end of the war his supporters had united in the Svensk Opposition (Swedish Opposition) which also included the supporters of Birger Furugård. The group advocated Swedish entry into World War II on the Axis side and went public with this aim in 1942, but in fact the country stayed neutral. He visited Germany in 1941, where, according to his memoirs, he was asked if he "wished to become a Swedish Quisling", writing that he would have replied "no", part of his attempts to paint himself as a patriot who would have resisted a Nazi invasion of Sweden. By 1943, Engdahl's party was considered to be the largest Nazi party in the country. Sweden's secret police also classified him as a Nazi. In 1942, Engdahl visited Norway's fascist leader Vidkun Quisling, and then met Wehrmacht representatives in Finland, leading to his passport being confiscated.

During the war, Engdahl published a newspaper, The Road Forward, which called for the extermination of Sweden's Jews. A May 1942 article in the newspaper blamed Jewish people for communism, and argued that, to answer the "Jewish question", Sweden should end Jewish immigration, remove Jews from government positions, replace Jewish administrators in corporations with Swedes, and outlaw marriage between Swedes and Jews. A month later, a young Ingvar Kamprad would contact Engdahl requesting a subscription, and Engdahl's connections to the future businessman would posthumously be controversial.

== Post-war activity ==
=== European fascist involvement ===
After World War II, Engdahl revived Nysvenska Rörelsen, publishing a paper, Vägen Framåt ('The Way Forward'), that concerned itself with attacks on communism and capitalism. Changes in the defamation laws in Sweden however meant that he largely had to eliminate the earlier strident anti-Semitic rhetoric from his writing. Nonetheless his reputation for attacks on the Jews saw him barred from entry into both West Germany and Switzerland. He was one of the contributors of a Nazi publication, Der Weg, which was published from 1947 in Buenos Aires, Argentina.

Engdahl also became a leading figure in the European neo-fascist scene, and was instrumental in setting up the European Social Movement (ESM) in 1951, hosting the meeting in his home base of Malmö, leading to the organization also being known as the Malmö Movement. The meeting was held on the week 14 May, and included delegates from Scandinavia, Belgium, Germany, France, Italy, and Switzerland. Engdahl personally contacted Sweden's prime minister, Tage Erlander, and received his personal assurance that he would fast-track the visa applications of Engdahl's foreign guests, with the Germans giving private reasons for their applications such as family visits. However, as the West German authorities warned Sweden's Aliens Commission about their Nazi activities, six of the German applicants were denied visas, including a representative from Der Weg, Karl-Heinz Priester and his wife. Engdahl had also wanted Otto Skorzeny to take part and initially lobbied the Aliens Commission to accept his visa application, but other Germans at the meeting expressed disapproval, which caused Engdahl to personally call the Aliens Commission and ask them to reject Skorzeny's application. Branches of the ESM were established in the Netherlands and Belgium, and a second meeting was held in Spain that year. Engdahl's book Västerlandets Förnyelse, published the same year, was widely read in such circles and was adopted as the chief ideological document of the ESM in 1954.

In August 1955, Engdahl contacted the government of Hesse, West Germany, to secure permission to hold an ESM meeting in Wiesbaden, but the government, headed by the German Social Democratic Party, refused. The meetings and Engdahl's involvement with the ESM caused the government of Konrad Adenauer to ban him from entering Germany. Although this group proved unsuccessful, Engdahl continued to be active in such circles for many years.

In 1957, Sweden's government coalition, comprising the Social Democratic Party and the Centre Party broke apart, leaving Erlander to head a minority Social Democratic government. The following year, Erlander called a snap election after his party's proposed pension scheme failed in the Riksdag. Engdahl presented himself as an electoral candidate in Gothenburg in election of 1958 and, although unsuccessful, he captured enough votes to deny the Social Democratic Party the seat.

=== Later life ===
Although Engdahl's influence declined throughout the 1960s and 1970s, he continued to be politically active until well into his old age and was a frequent contributor to the far-right journal Nation Europa. He also served as part of the journal's five man editorial board alongside Hans Oehler, Paul van Tienen, Erik Laerum and Erich Kern. As he aged, he became increasingly pro-European, in contrast to the growing Euroscepticism of younger members of Sweden's far-right. He also attracted the support of Holocaust deniers, an issue which historian Björn Kumm says Engdahl "wavered" on. Journalist Elisabeth Åsbrink described Engdahl as a Holocaust denier, noting his collaboration with Maurice Bardèche, an early formulator of Holocaust denial. Engdahl expressed support for Israel, viewing Israelis as "great enterprising pioneers of the desert".

Engdahl published his autobiography, Fribytare i folkhemmet, in 1979. His final political writing was Europa med svenska ögon (Europe through Swedish eyes), where he again argued for European unity. He was interviewed in the 1993 series Blågul nazism (Blue-yellow Nazism), broadcast by Sveriges Television. He died in Malmö on 4 May 1994, aged 85. His death was publicly announced in Sweden two weeks after his funeral.

== Legacy ==
=== Influence and assessment ===
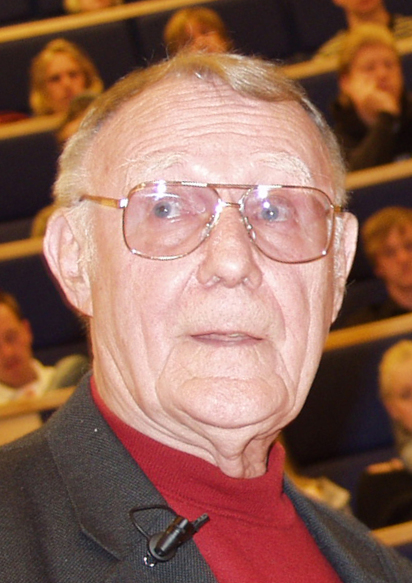
Engdahl's connections to IKEA founder Ingvar Kamprad (pictured) have put his name in the news several times since his death.

Nation Europa was still in circulation at the time of Engdahl's death. In 1979, Engdahl inspired the creation of the far-right organization Bevara Sverige Svenskt ("Keep Sweden Swedish"). This group was the predecessor to the modern party the Sweden Democrats. In 2023, some of his poetry was included in a book by literary professor Bibi Jonsson analyzing Swedish nationalist and Nazi poetry of the 1930s and 1940s.

In post-war Sweden, Engdahl emphatically denied that he was or had even been a Nazi, as well as his antisemitism. Åsbrink stated that "his actions speak louder than his words", while historian Conny Mithander viewed Engdahl's constructed narrative as selective and sanitized. Kumm agreed that Engdahl was not a Nazi, but wrote that "he was certainly a fascist". Many news sources have described Engdahl as a fascist. (Note: News sources describing Engdahl as a fascist include:)

The rabbi Abraham Cooper of the Simon Wiesenthal Center stated that "Anyone who reads history knows that if the Germans had won the war, Engdahl would have been the man to hand over the Jews". According to Mithander, Engdahl's involvement in the European Social Movement gave him the reputation as "the most dangerous Fascist in Europe".

=== Kamprad controversies ===
Engdahl donated all of his documents to the Swedish National Archives. His name once again became controversial after his death, when, on 21 October 1994, the newspaper Expressen published a story about information they found in his archived personal correspondence, revealing that Ingvar Kamprad, the founder of IKEA, had been a member of Engdahl's groups during the war. Kamprad publicly acknowledged his youthful fascist involvement, called it "delusional", and had an IKEA employee search through Engdahl's archives to find other preserved correspondence between the two. He stated that he attended Engdahl's meetings from 1945 to 1948, due to them both being fervent anti-communists, but that he left after he found the meetings to be in "pure Nazi style".

In the decades following his death, Engdahl largely faded from Sweden's public consciousness. However, he was again in the news in 2011, when a book by Elisabeth Åsbrink included details of a wedding invitation sent by Kamprad to Engdahl in 1950. Åsbrink clarified that Kamprad was still friendly with Engdahl well into the 1950s, which was when the latter was most politically active. According to Åsbrink, Kamprad said to her in a 2010 interview that "Per Engdahl is a great man, and I will maintain that as long as I live" (Swedish: Per Engdahl är en stor människa, och det kommer jag att vidmakthålla så länge jag lever), although a spokesperson for Kamprad stated that he rejected fascist and Nazi-sympathizing ideas. According to Åsbrink, Kamprad's alleged late appraisal of Engdahl went largely unnoticed, which she attributed to Engdahl being unknown to the public.

In 2022, during the Russian invasion of Ukraine, a poster was put outside of Sweden's embassy in Moscow which sought to portray famous Swedes as Nazi supporters. The poster included Kamprad's later quote about Engdahl being "great". The poster was described by critics as being part of a Russian disinformation campaign to portray the invasion as an effort to remove supposed neo-Nazis from Ukraine's government.

== See also ==
- Nils Flyg
- Birger Furugård
