= Richard Stöss =

Richard Stöss (born 18 March 1944) is a German political scientist and extraordinary professor at the Free University of Berlin. The focus of his research is on right-wing extremism and on political parties.

== Life ==
Richard Stöss was born during the final part of World War II at Sankt Goar, a small wine producing town on the left bank along the narrow section of the Rhine Gorge between Koblenz and Mainz. He passed his school final exams (Abitur) in 1965, just a few weeks short of his twenty-first birthday. Between 1969 and 1996 he worked at the Central Institute for Social Sciences Research at the Free University of Berlin, which is where in 1970 he received his first degree, in political sciences .

Till 1971 he combined his studies with part-time work as a research assistant. Between 1971 and 1976 he was a research assistant, and between 1976 and 1996 he was a research associate (initially on the DFG "Party systems" project, and subsequently unrestricted). He was supervised for his doctorate, which he received in 1978, by Wolf-Dieter Narr. His habilitation, also awarded by the Free University of Berlin, followed in 1984, was received in return for a dissertation on the "structure and development of the party system" in West Germany, which was subsequently adapted for wider publication.

In 1996 Stöss became a member of the Department of Political Sciences (today the Department of Political and Social Sciences) at the Free University of Berlin, also taking on the top job at the Otto Suhr Institute's "Otto-Stammer-Zentrum". In 2004 he was appointed an extraordinary professor.

Richard Stöss is a member of the SPD.

He has been retired from his full-time university commitments since April 2009.
