= Ensio Hiitonen =

Finnish Doctor of Law and lawyer

Kaarlo Ensio Paulus Hiitonen (last name until 1923 Hidén; 27 October 1900 Helsinki – 14 January 1970) was a Finnish Doctor of Law and lawyer of Alko.

Hiitonen's parents were Dr. Karl Julius Hidén and Helmi Liisi Parmanen. Hiitonen became an undergraduate in 1919 and graduated as a Bachelor of Philosophy in 1921, a Master of Philosophy in 1923, a Bachelor of Law in 1926, and a PhD in law in 1929.

Hiitonen was at the beginning of his career at the Ministry for Foreign Affairs, for example as a contributor to the newspaper division in 1925, a delegation assistant in Paris in 1926, Consul General in The Hague in 1929, Head of the League of Nations branches since 1929, Chargé d'Affaires in Prague 1938–1939 and Bucharest in 1939. He then served as Agent of the Finnish Film Chamber in 1942–1948 and as managing director in 1948–1949. Since 1949, he was a lawyer for Alko and a public relations officer.

Hiitonen was involved in politics first in the National Progressive Party and then in the Socialist Unity Party. At the end of the 1940s, he served as the editor of the Socialist Unity Party, the weekly magazine Vapaan Pohjola.

In 1953, Hiitonen published the book entitled "Vääryyttä oikeuden valekaavussa", in which he discussed, inter alia, political trials in the 1920s and 1930s and the imprisonment of so-called gang of six at the beginning of the Continuation War.
