= Socialist Unity Party (Finland) =

Socialist Unity Party Sosialistinen Yhtenäisyyspuolue
- Founded: 1946
- Dissolved: 1955
- Split from: Social Democratic Party of Finland
- Newspaper: Vapaa Pohjola
- Ideology: Socialism
- Political position: Left-wing
- National affiliation: Finnish People's Democratic League

Socialist Unity Party (Finnish: Sosialistinen Yhtenäisyyspuolue, SYP) was a left-wing political party in Finland. The SYP was founded in March 1946 by socialists working inside the communist-dominated Finnish People's Democratic League (SKDL). Most of the founders were former members of the Social Democratic Party of Finland (SDP). The SYP had many known politicians in its ranks but it never became a mass party. In 1955, the party split from the SKDL and was disestablished soon afterwards.

The founders of the SYP included the so-called "socialist six" (in Finnish "kuutoset") who were expelled from the SDP parliamentary group in 1940 before the summer 1941 Continuation War against Soviet Union. Another important group was the former "peace opposition" which split from the SDP after the war. In autumn 1946, two members of the SDP parliamentary group joined the SYP/SKDL. Some of the socialists working inside the SKDL never joined the SYP.

The first chairman of the SYP was J.W. Keto, former leader of the peace opposition. He was succeeded by Atos Wirtanen in 1948. In 1955, Wirtanen organized an extraordinary party congress in which it was decided that the SYP would leave SKDL. The congress, however, was held under somewhat shady conditions. The secretary of the congress was Wirtanen's wife and no representatives from the important Southern Workers Organization of Helsinki were present. Many leading members and sections of the SYP dismissed the congress, left the party and continued their work inside the SKDL.

The SYP organ was Vapaa Pohjola (Free Pohjola), a weekly newspaper which was published until 1949 and edited by Ensio Hiitonen. In 1952, the SYP published nine issues of the paper Yhteisrintama (United Front). During the summer of 1955, the party had a paper called Veckoposten (Weekly Post).
