= Strafgesetzbuch section 86a =

German prohibition of extremist symbols

The German Strafgesetzbuch (StGB; English: Criminal Code) in section § 86a outlaws use of symbols of "unconstitutional organizations" and terrorism outside the contexts of "art or science, research or teaching". The law does not name the individual symbols to be outlawed, and there is no official exhaustive list. However, the law has primarily been used to suppress fascist, Nazi, communist, extremist and Russian militarist symbols. The law, adopted during the Cold War, most notably affected the Communist Party of Germany, which was banned as unconstitutional in 1956; the Socialist Reich Party, which was banned in 1952; and several small far-right parties.

The law prohibits the distribution or public use of symbols of unconstitutional groups—in particular, flags, insignia, uniforms, slogans and forms of greeting.

== Text ==
The relevant excerpt of the German criminal code reads:

§ 86 StGB Dissemination of Means of Propaganda of Unconstitutional Organizations

1. Whoever domestically disseminates or produces, stocks, imports or exports or makes publicly accessible through data storage media for dissemination domestically or abroad, means of propaganda:
  1. of a party which has been declared to be unconstitutional by the Federal Constitutional Court or a party or organization, as to which it has been determined, no longer subject to appeal, that it is a substitute organization of such a party;
  2. of an organization, which has been banned, no longer subject to appeal, because it is directed against the constitutional order or against the idea of international understanding, or as to which it has been determined, no longer subject to appeal, that it is a substitute organization of such a banned organization;
  3. of a government, organization or institution outside of the territorial area of application of this law which is active in pursuing the objectives of one of the parties or organizations indicated in numbers 1 and 2; or
  4. means of propaganda, the contents of which are intended to further the aims of a former National Socialist organization,
  shall be punished with imprisonment for not more than three years or a fine.
2. ...
3. Subsection (1) shall not be applicable if the means of propaganda or the act serves to further civil enlightenment, to avert unconstitutional aims, to promote art or science, research or teaching, reporting about current historical events or similar purposes.
4. If guilt is slight, the court may refrain from imposition of punishment pursuant to this provision.

§ 86a StGB Use of Symbols of Unconstitutional Organizations

1. Whoever:
  1. domestically distributes or publicly uses, in a meeting or in writings (§ 11 subsection (3)) disseminated by him, symbols of one of the parties or organizations indicated in § 86 subsection (1), nos. 1, 2 and 4; or
  2. produces, stocks, imports or exports objects which depict or contain such symbols for distribution or use domestically or abroad, in the manner indicated in number 1,
  shall be punished with imprisonment for not more than three years or a fine.
2. Symbols, within the meaning of subsection (1), shall be, in particular, flags, insignia, uniforms, slogans and forms of greeting. Symbols which are so similar as to be mistaken for those named in sentence 1 shall be deemed to be equivalent thereto.
3. The exceptions from § 86 subsection (3) and (4) apply accordingly.

== Symbols affected ==
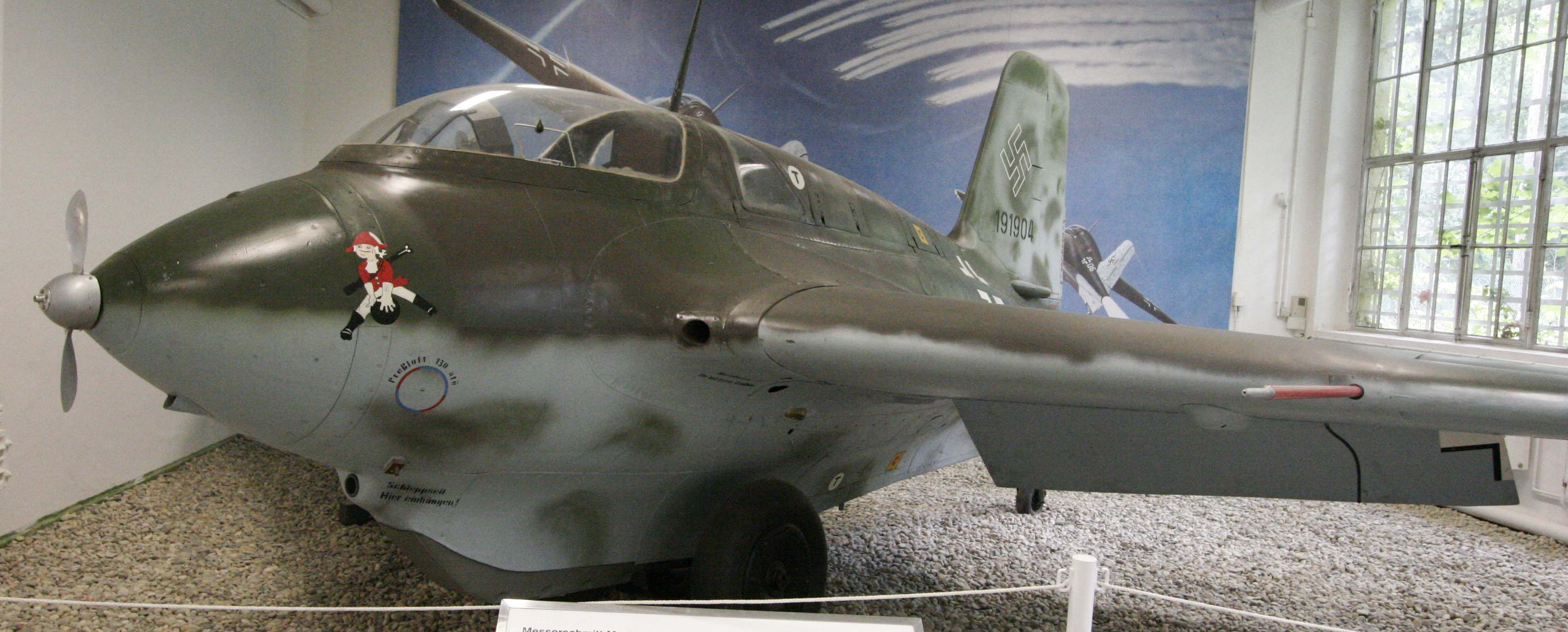
A restored Me 163B Komet World War II rocket fighter with a historically accurate, low-visibility swastika shown on the fin, as displayed in a German aviation museum in 2005

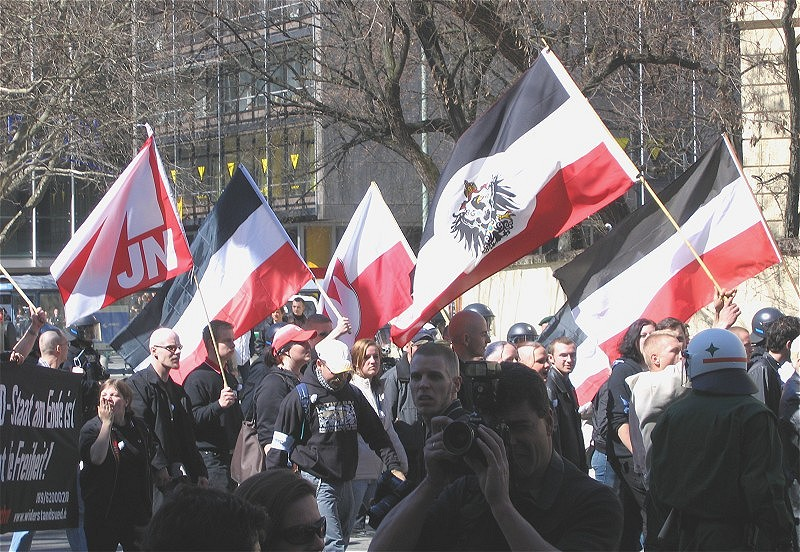
Participants in a Neo-Nazi march in Munich (2005) resorted to flying the Reichsflagge and Reichsdienstflagge of 1933–1935 (de) (outlawed by the Nazi regime in 1935) due to § 86a.

Flag of the Nazi Party (1920–1945), but with the Iron Cross instead of the swastika due to § 86a. Occasionally used by neo-Nazis.

Flag of the Strasserist Black Front (1930–1933), occasionally used by neo-Nazis as a substitute for the flag of Nazi Germany due to § 86a

The text of the law does not name the individual symbols to be outlawed, and there is no official exhaustive list. A symbol may be a flag, emblem, uniform, or a motto or greeting formula. The prohibition is not tied to the symbol itself but to its use in a context suggestive of association with outlawed organizations. Thus, the Swastika is outlawed if used in a context of völkisch ideology — while it is legitimate if used as a symbol of religious faith — particularly any South, South Eastern or East Asian religions. Similarly, the Wolfsangel is outlawed if used in the context of the Junge Front but not in other contexts such as heraldry, or as the emblem of "landscape poet" Hermann Löns.

Because of the law, German Neo-Nazis took to displaying modified symbols similar but not identical with those outlawed. In 1994, such symbols were declared equivalent to the ones they imitate (Verbrechensbekämpfungsgesetz § 2). As a result of the ban on Nazi symbols, German Neo-Nazis have used older symbols such as the black-white-red German Imperial flag (which was also briefly used by the Nazis alongside the party flag as one of two official flags of Nazi Germany from 1933 until 1935) as well as variants of this flag such as the one with the Eiserne Kreuz and the Reichsdienstflagge variants, the Imperial-era Reichskriegsflagge, the Schwarze Sonne and the flag of the Strasserite Black Front – a splinter Nazi organization – as alternatives. They have also used the American Confederate battle flag, due to its association with racism and white supremacy.

Affected by the law according to Federal Constitutional Court of Germany rulings are:

- Sozialistische Reichspartei (1952)
- Kommunistische Partei Deutschlands (1956)
- Freie Deutsche Jugend (West Germany)
- Volkssozialistische Bewegung Deutschlands/Partei der Arbeit (1982)
- Aktionsfront Nationaler Sozialisten/Nationale Aktivisten (1983)
- Deutsche Alternative (1992) (not to be confused with Alternative für Deutschland)
- Nationalistische Front (1992)
- Wiking-Jugend (1994)
- Freiheitliche Deutsche Arbeiterpartei (1995)
- Blood & Honour, Germany chapter (2000)

Symbols known to fall under the law are:

- the swastika as a symbol of the Nazi Party, prohibited in all variants, including mirrored, inverted etc. (Note: Exceptions are only applied to swastikas used as religious symbols in Hindu, Buddhist, and Jain temples.)
- a stylized Celtic cross, prohibited as a symbol of the VSBD/PdA and in the variant used by the White Power movement. The legal status of the symbol used in non-political contexts is uncertain, but non-political use is not acted upon in practice.
- the solar cross as a symbol of the Ku Klux Klan (symbol of cross burning from the "second Klan" era onward), the German Faith Movement, the Thule Society and the 5th and 11th Waffen SS divisions
- the Sig rune as used by the SS
- the Sturmabteilung emblem
- the legal status of the Othala SS-rune is disputed; prohibited as a symbol of the Hitler-Jugend/Wiking-Jugend. Post-war military usage was incorporated into the Bundeswehr with a stylized "Odal SS-rune" being featured on the shoulder insignia of the Hauptfeldwebel with it also being used by the ranks succeeding it.
- the Wolfsangel as used by the 2nd, 4th and 34th Waffen-SS divisions, Hitlerjugend and Junge Front
- Gauwinkel badges (2002)
- Reichskriegsflagge: prohibited in the Third Reich version including a swastika.
- the "Heil Hitler" greeting (1970)
- the "Sieg Heil" greeting (1990)
- Unsere/Meine Ehre heißt Treue, along with the Totenkopf symbol, as the motto of the Waffen-SS and Mit deutschem Gruß as the verbal equivalent of the Hitler salute.
- The Reichsadler with the Nazi swastika.
- the "Horst-Wessel-Lied" (the anthem of the Nazi Party) and "Unsre Fahne flattert uns voran" (a song of the Hitler-Jugend) (1991)
- The symbols of the Ustaše featuring the flags of the Independent State of Croatia and the slogan "Za dom spremni"
- the hammer and sickle, red star and red flag when used as emblems of the Communist Party of Germany
- The Black Standard of the Islamic State; widely considered the chief sigil or flag of the jihadi group.
- the People's Protection Units (YPG) pennant was explicitly banned as a symbol related to the PKK on 2 March 2017, even though the organisation itself is not currently recognised as terrorist.
- Since the 2022 Russia-Ukraine war, several states including Berlin, Lower Saxony and Bavaria are looking to put the military Z symbol under the law.
- Hamas is considered a terrorist organisation in the European Union and has been forbidden in Germany since 2023. Accordingly, the public use of all symbols of Hamas is prohibited, including their emblem, flag, logo, images of their representatives, and the red triangle used by Hamas to mark their targets. The phrase "From the river to the sea" is also considered a symbol of Hamas, as long as it is not used in a context that "unambiguously" has nothing to do with the organisation, for example if the organisers of a demonstration have explicitly distanced themselves from Hamas. The use of the Palestinian flag is generally allowed, but might be subjected to restrictions in some schools. Palestinian flags have been confiscated by the police at some demonstrations.

Illustration of the emblems mentioned in the list above:

Nazi swastika

Party Eagle (Parteiadler) of the Nazi Party

Solar cross

Celtic cross as used by White Power movements

Broken solar cross of the Thule Society and the German Faith Movement

Ku Klux Klan (1915–current) (Note: "Fiery cross" from the 1905 novel The Clansman: A Historical Romance of the Ku Klux Klan, and its 1915 film adaptation The Birth of a Nation)

Wolfsangel

Odal rune

Sturmabteilung emblem

Schutzstaffel sig runes

Totenkopf

Flag of the Nazi Party

Flag of the Third Reich (1935–1945)

Reichskriegsflagge 1935–1938 (national war flag)

Reichskriegsflagge 1938–1945 (national war flag)

Reichsdienstflagge 1935–1945 (Reich service flag)

Ustaše with the Croatian checkerboard start from the white

Flag of the Independent State of Croatia (Zastava Nezavisne Države Hrvatske, 1941–1945)

Coat of arms of NDH (1941–1945)

Emblem of the Communist Party of Germany (redrawn after a historical lapel pin)

Red flag of the Communist Party of Germany

Reverse side of the red flag of the Communist Party of Germany

Islamic State version of the jihadist black flag

Flag of the Kurdish People's Protection Units

Russian "Z" military symbol

Hamas flag (Note: Whole Hamas-related symbols)

== Anti-fascist symbols ==
The No symbol applied to the swastika

In 2005, controversy arose about whether the paragraph should be taken to apply to the display of crossed-out swastikas as a symbol of anti-fascism. In late 2005 police raided the offices of the punk rock label and mail order store "Nix Gut Records" and confiscated merchandise depicting crossed-out swastikas and fists smashing swastikas. In 2006, the Stade police department started an inquiry against anti-fascist youths using a placard depicting a person dumping a swastika into a trashcan. The placard was displayed in opposition to the campaign of right-wing nationalist parties for local elections.

On Friday, 17 March 2006, a member of the Bundestag, Claudia Roth, reported herself to the German police for displaying a crossed-out swastika in multiple demonstrations against Neo-Nazis and got the Bundestag to suspend her immunity from prosecution. She intended to show the absurdity of charging anti-fascists with using fascist symbols: "We don't need prosecution of non-violent young people engaging against right-wing extremism." On 15 March 2007, the Federal Court of Justice of Germany (Bundesgerichtshof) reversed the charge and held that the crossed-out symbols were "clearly directed against a revival of national-socialist endeavors", which thereby settled the dispute for the future.

== Application to forms of media ==
Section 86a includes a social adequacy clause that allows the use of the symbols that fall within it for the purposes of "art or science, research or teaching". This generally allows these symbols to be used in literature, television shows (as with the 1968 Star Trek episode, "Patterns of Force", itself allowed after 1995), films, and other works of art without censoring or modification and stay within the allowance for the clause. For example, German cinemas were allowed to screen Raiders of the Lost Ark and Inglourious Basterds, films which feature frequent displays of Nazi symbols (albeit clearly depicting the users of these symbols as villains), without censorship.

Up until 2018, video games were not included in the social adequacy clause. A High District Frankfurt Court ruling in 1998 over the video game Wolfenstein 3D determined that because video games do attract young players, "this could lead to them growing up with these symbols and insignias and thereby becoming used to them, which again could make them more vulnerable for ideological manipulation by national socialist ideas". Since this ruling, the Unterhaltungssoftware Selbstkontrolle (USK), the German content ratings board, would refuse to rate any game that includes symbols under Section 86a, effectively banning them from retail sales within Germany. This led to software developers and publishers to either avoid publication in Germany, or create alternative, non-offending symbols to replace them, such as in Wolfenstein II: The New Colossus, where the developer had to replace the game's representation of Adolf Hitler with a version without the moustache and named "Chancellor Heiler".

In August 2018, the German government reversed this ruling as a result of a ruling from April 2018. The web-based game Bundesfighter II Turbo was released prior to the September 2017 elections, which included parodies of the candidates fighting each other; this included Alexander Gauland, who had a special move that involved swastika imagery. When this was noticed by public authorities, they began prosecution of the game in December 2017, submitting it to the Public Prosecutor General's office for review based on the Wolfenstein 3D decision. The Attorney General declined to consider the game illegal under Section 86a, stating that the 1998 ruling was outdated; since then, USK had adopted age ratings for video games, and that there was no reason not to consider video games as art within the social adequacy clause. As a result, the Federal Department for Media Harmful to Young Persons adapted the Attorney General's ruling to be applicable for all video games within Germany, and subsequently the USK announced this change in August 2018; USK will still review all games to judge whether the use of imagery under Section 86a remains within the social adequacy clause and deny ratings to those that fail to meet this allowance. In August 2020, Through the Darkest of Times, in which players follow an anti-Nazi resistance group, became the first game permitted by USK to depict swastikas.

== See also ==
- Bans on Nazi symbols
- Bans on communist symbols
- Censorship in Germany
- List of symbols designated by the Anti-Defamation League as hate symbols in the United States
- Memory law
- Modern display of the Confederate battle flag
- Thor Steinar
- Verbotsgesetz 1947 in Austria
