= Racism in Germany =

Racism in Germany encompasses both historical and contemporary forms of racial discrimination and prejudice. This includes the colonial-era genocide of the Herero and Nama people, state-sanctioned racism in Nazi Germany that culminated in the Holocaust, and ongoing issues in post-reunification Germany.

During the Nazi era, policies such as the Nuremberg Laws codified racial hierarchies and led to the persecution of Jews, Roma, and other groups deemed "inferior". After World War II and German reunification, there have been instances of racist street violence and reports of systemic discrimination against immigrants and ethnic minorities and International human rights organizations have documented evidence of institutional under-representation, marginalization, and racial profiling.

Germany has also faced accusations of anti-Palestinian racism, including allegations of censorship, police violence and the conflation of anti-Zionism with antisemitism. The Bundestag's labeling of the BDS movement as antisemitic, along with allegations by academics and artists of a "witch hunt" against pro-Palestinian activists, has sparked controversy.

== 19th and early 20th centuries ==
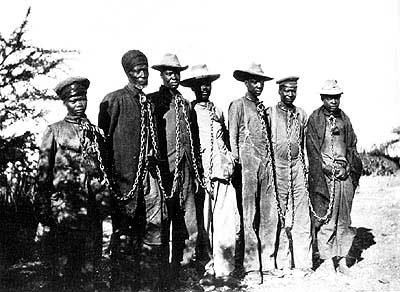
Herero people chained up in 1904

When Germany struggled to become a belated colonial power in the 19th century, several atrocities were committed, most notably the Herero and Nama genocide in what is now Namibia. The German authorities forced the survivors of the genocide into concentration camps.

Eugen Fischer, a German professor of medicine, anthropology and eugenics conducted "medical experiments on race" in these camps, including sterilizations and injections of smallpox, typhus and tuberculosis. He advocated the genocide of alleged "inferior races" stating that "whoever thinks thoroughly about the notion of race, cannot arrive at a different conclusion".

The Herero genocide has commanded the attention of historians who study complex issues of continuity between this event and the Nazi Holocaust. According to Clarence Lusane, an Associate Professor of Political Science at the American University School of International Service, Fischer's experiments can be seen as testing ground for later medical procedures used during the Nazi Holocaust.

=== Against the Polish population ===
The Germanization policies against the Polish population in Germany were largely concentrated in territories conquered from Poland during the Partitions of Poland, but they were also enforced in Silesia, Pomerania and Masuria. They were motivated by racism.

=== The Third Reich ===
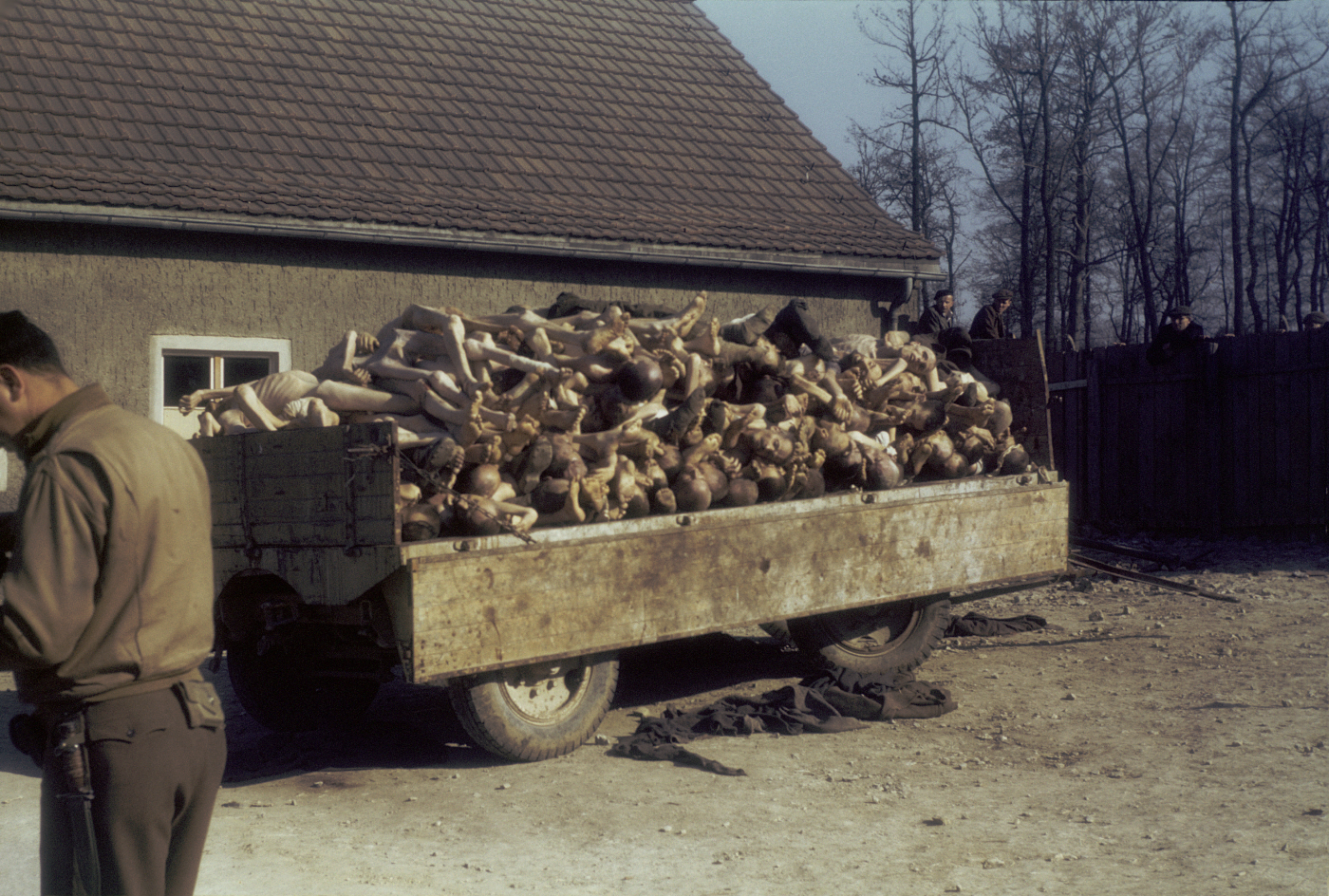
Corpses at the Buchenwald concentration camp

After the Nazis came to power in 1933, racism became a part of the official state ideology.

Shortly after the Nazis came to power, they passed the Law for the Restoration of the Professional Civil Service which expelled all civil servants who were of "non-Aryan" origin, with a few exceptions.

The Nazis passed the Nuremberg Laws in 1935. The first law known as the "Law for the Protection of German Blood and German Honour" forbade sexual relations and marriages between people of "German blood" and Jews. Shortly afterwards, the Nazis extended this law to include "Gypsies, negroes or their bastards".

Although the Nazis preached racial supremacy, in several books and pamphlets they stated that they were preaching racial consciousness rather than supremacy such as:

The fundamental reason for excluding foreign-race groups from a people’s body is not discrimination or contempt, but rather the realization of otherness. Only through such thinking will it be possible for the peoples to again become healthy and able to respect each other.

The Nazis believed that race determined everything and they told the Germans to be racially conscious.

In the 1930s and 1940s, Nazi Germany's military conquest of Europe in the Second World War was followed by countless acts of racially motivated murder and genocide.

In its broad definition, the term Holocaust refers to an industrially run programme of state-sponsored murder by Nazi Germany, a genocide of different groups and the murder of individuals, whom the German authorities at this time defined as belonging to an "inferior race", as having "life unworthy of life" or advocating beliefs that were disturbing to their politics. The affected cultures use their own expressions such as: The Shoah (Hebrew: השואה, HaShoah, "catastrophe"; Yiddish: חורבן, Churben or Hurban, in the Jewish context, the Porajmos [ˌpɔʁmɔs] (also Porrajmos or Pharrajimos, literally "devouring" or "destruction" in some dialects of the Romani language) used by Romani people, or the Polish word "Zagłada" (literally meaning "annihilation", or "extinction") often used by Poles as a synonym of the word Holocaust.

The Holocaust was one of many outbreaks of antisemitism, a term coined in the late 19th century in Germany as a more scientific-sounding term for Judenhass ("Jew-hatred"). Scientific theories on antisemitism are divided into what degree it can be subsumed under racism and to what degree it can be subsumed under other causes and mechanisms.

== From the late 20th century to the present day ==
=== Incidents in reunified Germany ===
More than 130 people were killed in racist street violence in Germany, in the years between 1990 and 2010, according to the German newspaper Die Zeit. Only some of the most publicly noted cases are listed below. In particular, after German reunification in the 1990s a wave of racist street violence claimed numerous lives, with notable incidents including the arson attack in Mölln and the Riot of Rostock-Lichtenhagen in 1992, the Solingen arson attack of 1993, and the attack on Noël Martin in 1996.

In 2006, a black German citizen of Ethiopian descent named as Ermyas M., an engineer was beaten into a coma by two unknown assailants who called him "nigger" in an unprovoked attack that has reawakened concern about racist violence in eastern Germany. He was waiting for a tram in Potsdam, near Berlin, when two people approached him shouting "nigger". When he objected, they attacked him with a bottle and beat him to the ground.

Also in 2006, German-Turkish politician Giyasettin Sayan, a member of Berlin's regional assembly, was attacked by two men who called him a "dirty foreigner". Sayan, who represents the Left party, suffered head injuries and bruising after his attackers struck him with a bottle in a street in his Lichtenberg ward in the East of the city.

In August 2007, a mob consisting of about 50 Germans attacked 8 Indian street vendors during a town festival in the town of Muegeln near Leipzig. The victims found shelter in a pizzeria owned by Kulvir Singh, one of those being chased, but the mob broke through the doors and destroyed Singh's car. All eight were injured and it took 70 police to quell the violence

There is evidence that, in 2015, Professor Annette Beck-Sickinger at the University of Leipzig in Germany rejected Indian candidates on the basis of racism and stereotyping. The incidents were so severe - amid shock that they were perpetrated by an apparently 'educated' woman - that Germany's ambassador to India wrote a strongly worded letter condemning the professor, stating: "Your oversimplifying and discriminating generalization is an offense ... to millions of law-abiding, tolerant, open-minded and hard-working Indians," he wrote. "Let's be clear: India is not a country of rapists."

=== General reports ===
The European Commission against Racism and Intolerance (ECRI) noted in 2001, in its second report on the situation of the approximately 9% non- citizen population after German reunification:

(…) that, in spite of the considerable number of non-citizens who have been living in Germany for a long time or even from birth, there was a reluctance by Germany to consider itself as a country of immigration.” Persons of immigrant origin, including those who are second or third generation born in Germany, tended to remain 'foreigners' in German statistics and public discourse.

Civil rights activist Ika Hügel-Marshall has complained that she and others found it difficult to be regarded as German due to their ethnic background. She co-founded the Afro-Deutsch movement in the 1980s to raise awareness of Germans with African ancestry. The movement was designed "to resist marginalization and discrimination, to gain social acceptance, and to construct a cultural identity for themselves."

According to the United Nations, people with a migrant background also "are under-represented in important institutions, including the political system, the police and the courts".

=== Public debate ===
Critics say that a lingering xenophobia in parts of German society is being ignored. A representative from the country's Jewish Council argued that Germany is lacking a coordinated "nationwide action plan" when it comes to right-wing extremism.

A former government spokesman Uwe-Karsten Heye said that dark-skinned visitors to Germany should consider avoiding the eastern part of the country where racism runs high. "There are small and medium-sized towns in Brandenburg, as well as elsewhere, which I would advise a visitor of another skin color to avoid going to. It is also reported that German police "routinely ignore racist attacks". Former SPD politician Sebastian Edathy said "People with dark skin have a much higher risk of being a victim of an attack in eastern Germany than in western Germany." He also accused municipalities in the east of not investing enough in the prevention of right-wing extremism."

Undercover journalist Günter Wallraff traveled across Germany for more than a year wearing a dark-haired curly wig and his white skin painted black, in a documentary film titled Black on White. He said that "I hadn't known what we would discover, and had thought maybe the story will be, what a tolerant and accepting country we have become, unfortunately I was wrong".

According to a 2019 report presented by the German Federal Anti-Discrimination Agency, the number of cases of racial discrimination reported in Germany rose by almost 10% to 1,176 since 2015.

Germany has an "ongoing problem with racial discrimination and does not give enough consistent legal support to victims," says Bernhard Franke, the acting head of the German Federal Anti-Discrimination Agency. According to him, the feeling of being left alone with injustice has "dire consequences in the long run that endanger social cohesion."

In 2015, Rhineland-Palatinate interior minister Roger Lewentz said the former communist states were "more susceptible" to "xenophobic radicalization" because former East Germany had not had the same exposure to foreign people and cultures over the decades that the people in the West of the country have had.

A 2017 study found that the reason why East Germans were more prone to hold right-wing extreme and xenophobia views, was due to East Germany communist rule.

=== Racial profiling ===
In February 2012, the first court ruling concerning racial profiling in German police policy, allowing police to use skin color and "non-German ethnic origin" to select persons who will be asked for identification in spot-checks for illegal immigrants. Subsequently, it was decided legal for a person submitted to a spot-check to compare the policy to that of the SS in public. A higher court later overruled the earlier decision declaring the racial profiling unlawful and in violation of anti-discrimination provisions in Art. 3 Basic Law and the General Equal Treatment Act of 2006.

The civil rights organisation Büro zur Umsetzung von Gleichbehandlung (Office for the Implementation of Equal Treatment) makes a distinction between criminal profiling, which is legitimate in Germany, and ethnic profiling, which is not.

According to a 2016 report by the Interior ministry in Germany, there had been an increase in hate crimes and violence against migrant groups in Germany. The reports concluded that there were more than 10 attacks per day against migrants in Germany in 2016. This report from Germany garnered the attention of the United Nations, which alleged that people of African descent face widespread discrimination in Germany.

A 2017 statement by the Office of the UN High Commissioner for Rights after a visit to Germany states: "While the Basic Law guarantees equality, prohibits racial discrimination, and states that human dignity is inviolable, it is not being enforced." and calls racial profiling by police officials endemic. Recommendations include legal reform, establishing an independent complaint system, training and continuing education for the police, and investigations to promote accountability and remedy.

=== Racist organizations in Germany ===
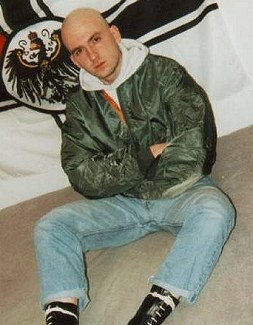
German white power skinhead

Despite widespread rejection of Nazi Germany in modern Germany, there have been Neo-Nazi activities and organizations in post-war Germany. At times these groups face legal issues. Hence the Volkssozialistische Bewegung Deutschlands/Partei der Arbeit, Action Front of National Socialists/National Activists, Free German Workers' Party, and the Nationalist Front were all banned. The National Democratic Party of Germany has been accused of Neo-Nazi or Neo-Fascist leanings but historian Walter Laqueur writes that it cannot be classified that way.

=== Anti-Palestinian racism ===
Palestinians in Germany have described a "crackdown and criminalisation" of Palestinians which has included police violence at protests, racial profiling, censorship, and violations of their human rights. Majed Abusalama, co-founder of Palestine Speaks in Germany, suggests German anti-Palestinianism is increasing.

In 2019, the Bundestag declared the Boycott, Divestment and Sanctions (BDS) movement to be a form of antisemitism. In response, the BDS movement condemned the motion as anti-Palestinian. The Palestinian B.D.S. National Committee issued a statement declaring the motion an "anti-Palestinian...McCarthyite and unconstitutional resolution passed by the German Parliament." British musician Brian Eno has argued that pro-Palestinian artists are subjected to "censorship and inquisitorial McCarthyism" due to the actions of the German government and anti-Palestinian groups.

On 27 April 2023, ahead of the 75th anniversary of Israel's independence, or for Palestinians the 75th anniversary of the Nakba, prominent German politician and president of the European Commission Ursula von der Leyen referred to Israel as a "vibrant democracy" in the Middle East that "made the desert bloom" in remarks criticized by the foreign ministry of the Palestinian Authority as a "propagandist discourse" propagating an "anti-Palestinian racist trope" and a "whitewashing" of Israeli occupation.

Germany's relationship with Palestine has been described as "complex". At present, Germany's political class exhibits a "zealous identification with Israel" that is "often explained in terms of the country's past". Alternative readings, however, view this trend as a "qualitatively new phenomenon in Germany largely unrelated to moral considerations pertaining to the Nazi era". Hannah C. Tzuberi argues that German manifestations of "anti-antisemitism" (which has been described as "a defining marker of post-war German identity") can go beyond the identification of Germans with Jews, sometimes leading to the identification of German gentiles as Jews, and the identification of Germany as Israel.

A 2024 study examined the influence of the 2009 proclamation of a German "reason of state" (Staatsräson) regarding Israel, on the perception of Palestinians. The authors documented a removal of Palestine-related content from educational curricula, a narrowing of the range of opinions, and the criminalization of Palestinian voices.

In 2020, scholars and artists began accusing Germany of a "witch hunt" against those who express pro-Palestinian solidarity. The European Legal Support Center (ELSC) has also accused Germany of human rights violations for laws which it says amount to suppression of pro-Palestinian activism, which it says particularly affects Jews and Palestinians. Artists for Palestine says Germany has censured a number of artists for expressing pro-Palestinian sentiment, include Kamila Shamsie, Kae Tempest, Young Fathers, Talib Kwelli, Walid Raad and Nirit Sommerfeld.

In 2024, Liz Fekete described systemic anti-Palestinian racism in German politics, media and police, including the criminalization and stigmatization of pro-Palestinian demonstrations, and the treatment of any criticism of Israel's colonialist politics as antisemitic and blasphemous. She adds: ″this cannot be explained away simply by alluding to Germany’s desire to atone for the Holocaust.″

== Sources ==
- Bennhold, Katrin (17 May 2019). "German Parliament Deems B.D.S. Movement Anti-Semitic". The New York Times.
- Eno, Brian (4 February 2021). "Artists like me are being censored in Germany – because we support Palestinian rights". The Guardian.
- Nasr, Joseph; Alkousaa, Riham (17 May 2019). "Germany designates BDS Israel boycott movement as anti-Semitic". Reuters.
- Shemoelof, Mati (21 July 2021). "The Israelis challenging the German left's anti-Palestinian politics". +972 Magazine.
