= Prussian nationalism =

Nationalism based on Prussian identity

Civil flag of Prussia, 1701–1935. This flag was also the province flag of East Prussia.

Prussian nationalism was the state nationalism that asserted that Prussians were a nation and promoted the cultural unity of Prussians. Prussian nationalism arose as a result of the state-building by the Hohenzollern dynasty that was initiated with the merger of Brandenburg with East Prussia in the 16th century followed later by the incorporation of West Prussia, Pomerania, Silesia, and large portions of the Rhineland and Westphalia by the 19th century. Prussian nationalism has ceased with Prussia becoming non-existent in post-World War II period.

Prussian nationalism was influential in several military conflicts: the Second Schleswig War in 1864, the Austro-Prussian War in 1866, and the Franco-Prussian War in 1870; with Prussian nationalist sentiment emphasizing Protestant triumphalism. In 1871, Prussia led the unification of Germany into the German Empire in which the German Emperor was also the King of Prussia. The state of Germany as manifested in the German Empire created by the Prussian government of Otto von Bismarck, drew criticisms by German nationalists like Konstantin Franz who accused Bismarck of creating a federal state based on Prussian nationalist goals and a deviation from German nationalism.

== See also ==
- Austrian nationalism
- Bavarian nationalism
- German nationalism
- Polish nationalism
