= Austrian nationalism =

Ideological notion

Flag of Austria

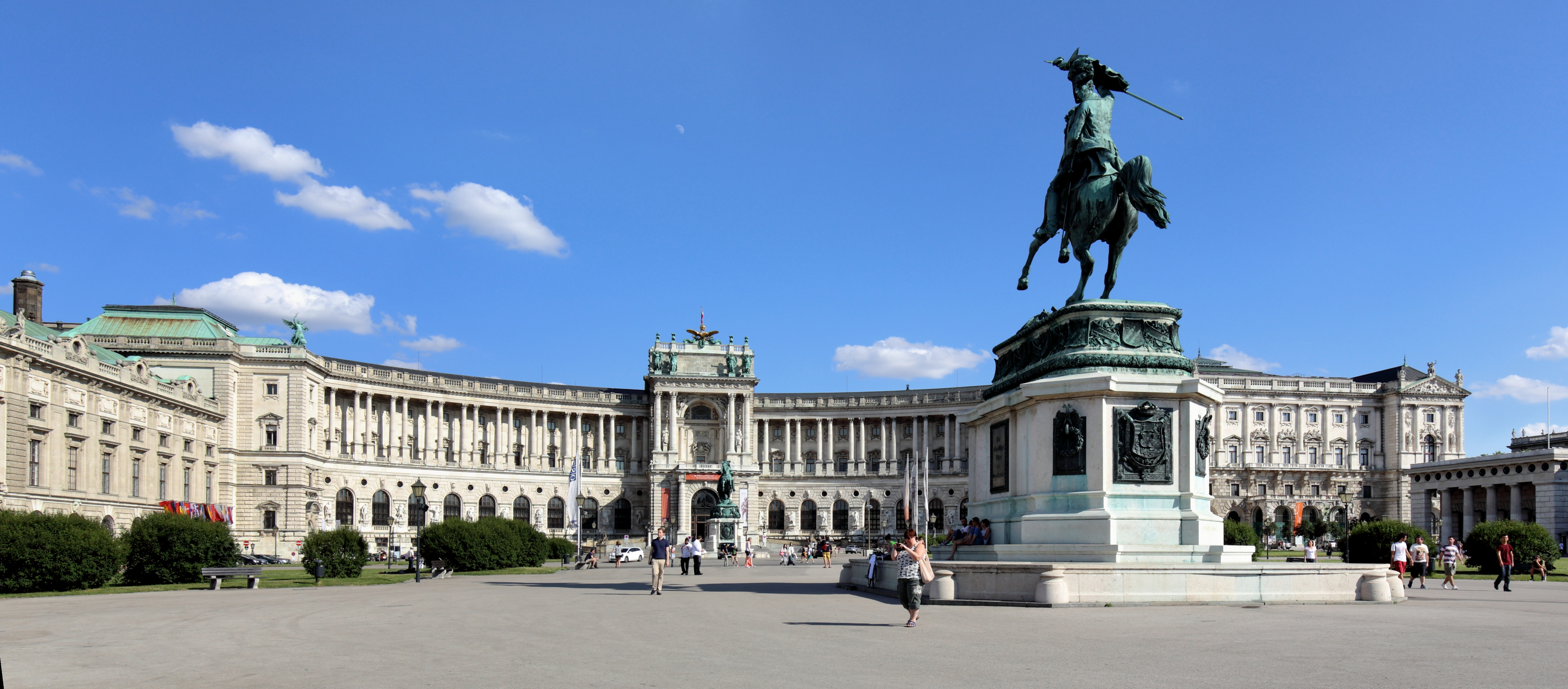
Heldenplatz (Heroes' Square) in Vienna with the statue of Archduke Charles of Austria in front of Hofburg Palace, Charles was Austria's main military leader who fought against France during the Napoleonic Wars.

Austrian nationalism (Austrian German: Österreichischer Nationalismus) is the nationalism that asserts that Austrians are a nation and promotes the cultural unity of Austrians. Austrian nationalism originally developed as a cultural nationalism that emphasized a Catholic religious identity. This in turn led to its opposition to unification with Protestant-majority Prussia, something that was perceived as a potential threat to the Catholic core of Austrian national identity. It was also used to protect the rule of the Habsburgs.

Austrian nationalism first arose during the Napoleonic Wars, with Joseph von Hormayr as a prominent Austrian nationalist political leader at the time. In the 1930s the Fatherland Front government of Engelbert Dollfuss and Kurt Schuschnigg rejected current pan-German aspirations to join Austria with a Protestant-dominated Germany, whilst not wholly rejecting a potential union and claiming that any unification of Austria with Germany would require a federal German state where Austria and Austrians were guaranteed privileged status recognizing an Austrian nation within a German Kulturnation. Following the events of World War II and Nazism, Austrians began to reject the German identity, and a broader Austrian identity replaced it. After the war, some Austrians went as far as describing themselves as "Hitler's first victim".

In the post-World War II period proponents who recognize an Austrian nation have rejected a German identity of Austrians and have emphasized the non-Germanic heritage of Austrian culture including Celtic, Illyrian, Roman, Slavic and Magyar influences. Proponents who recognize Austrians as a nation claim that Austrians have Celtic heritage, as Austria is the location of the first characteristically Celtic culture (Hallstatt culture) to exist. Contemporary Austrians express pride in having Celtic heritage and Austria possesses one of the largest collections of Celtic artifacts in Europe. In addition to German, the State of Austria also recognizes three minority languages in the country.

Austrian nationalism has been challenged internally. The main rival nationalism has been German nationalism. Another rival nationalism emerged after the defeat of Austria-Hungary in World War I, Bavarian nationalism which challenged the new Austrian Republic with proposals for Austria to join Bavaria. At this time the Bavarian government held particular interest in incorporating the regions of North Tyrol and Upper Austria into Bavaria. This was a serious issue in the aftermath of World War I with significant numbers of Austria's North Tyrolese declaring their intention to have North Tyrol join Bavaria.

== History ==
=== Origins ===
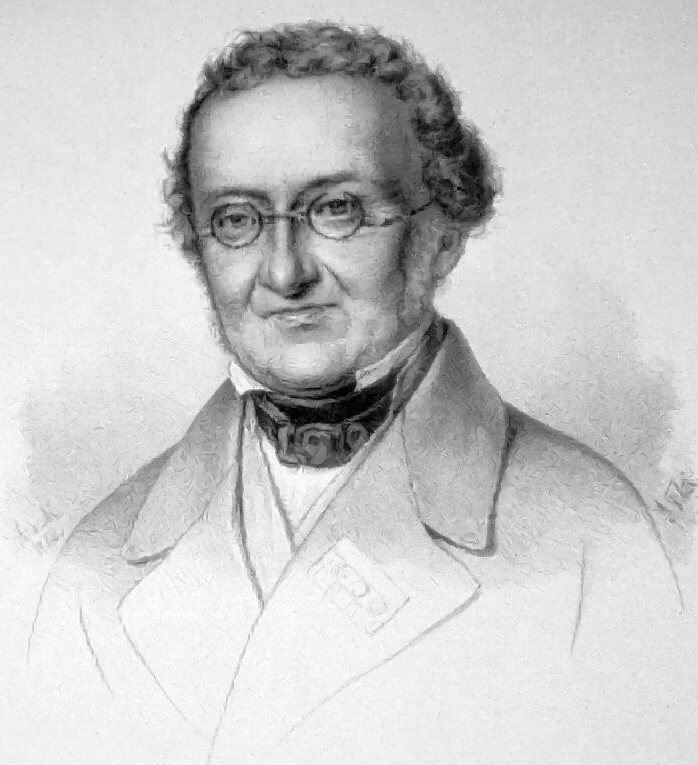
Josef von Hormayr, the prominent Austrian nationalist political leader during the Napoleonic Wars.

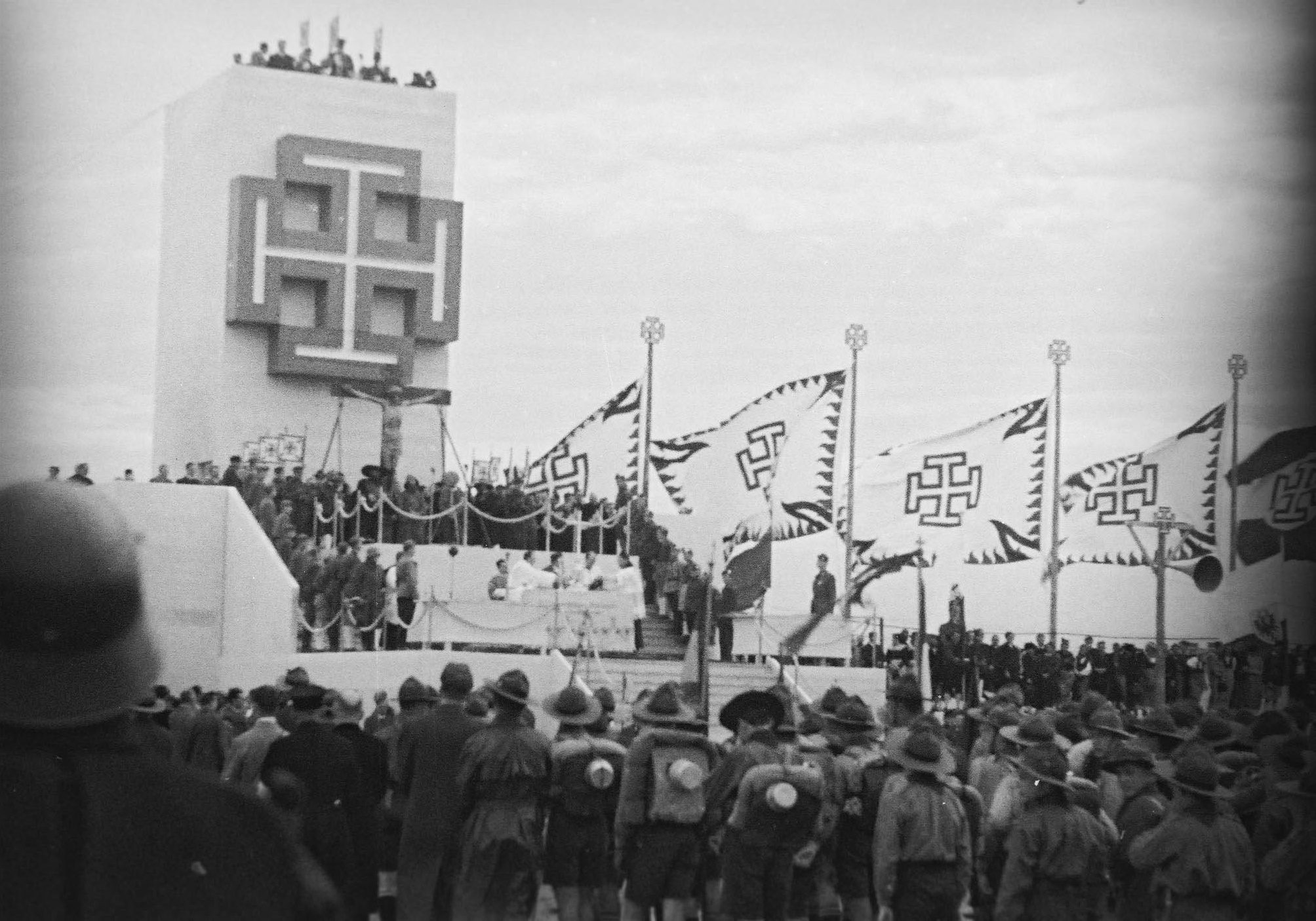
Rally of the Fatherland's Front in 1936.

The Napoleonic Wars were the cause of the final dissolution of the Holy Roman Empire of the German nation, and ultimately the cause for the quest for a German nation state in 19th-century German nationalism.

German nationalism began to rise rapidly within the German Confederation, in 1866 the feud between the two most powerful German states Austria and Prussia finally came to a head in the German war in 1866. The Austrians favoured the Greater Germany unification but were not willing to give up any of the non-German-speaking land inside of the Austrian Empire and take second place to Prussia. The Prussians however wanted to unify Germany as Little Germany primarily by the Kingdom of Prussia, whilst excluding Austria. In the final battle of the German war (Battle of Königgrätz) the Prussians successfully defeated the Austrians and succeeded in creating the North German Confederation. In 1871, Germany was unified as a nation-state as the German Empire that was Prussian-led and without Austria. Nevertheless, the integration of the Austrians remained a strong desire for many people of both Austria and Germany, especially among the liberals, the social democrats and also the Catholics who were a minority within the Protestant Germany.

=== Post-World War One ===
The idea of uniting all ethnic Germans into one state began to be challenged with the rise of Austrian nationalism within the Christian Social Party that identified Austrians on the basis of their predominantly Catholic religious identity as opposed to the predominantly Protestant religious identity of the Prussians. More than 90 % of interbellum Austrians identified as Catholic. Following the end of World War I in the rump state of German-Austria, many Austrians desired to be united with Germany. However, less than 50 % of Austrians desired unification with Germany in the 1920s, and this sentiment further declined with the fall of the pan-Germanist Social Democrat government under Karl Renner.

The Fatherland Front (VF) was the right-wing conservative, authoritarian, nationalist, and corporatist ruling political organisation of the Federal State of Austria. It claimed to be a nonpartisan movement, and aimed to unite all the people of Austria, overcoming political and social divisions. Established on 20 May 1933 by Christian Social Chancellor Engelbert Dollfuss as the only legally permitted party in the country, it was organised along the lines of Italian Fascism, was fully aligned with the Catholic Church, and did not advocate any racial ideology, as Italian Fascism later did. It advocated Austrian nationalism and independence from Germany on the basis of protecting Austria's Catholic religious identity from what they considered a Protestant-dominated German state.

With the rise of Engelbert Dollfuss to power in Austria in 1932 and the creation of the Fatherland's Front, the Dollfuss government promoted Austrian nationalism and claimed that Catholic Austria would not accept joining a Protestant Germany or "heathen" Nazi-led Germany. Dollfuss accepted that Austrians were Germans but rejected the idea of Catholic Austrians submitting themselves to be taken over by a Protestant-dominated Germany, and instead claimed that Austria needed to revive itself and recognize the greatness of its history such as its Habsburg dynasty having been the leading part of the German Holy Roman Empire, and that when Austria restored itself, it would found a federal state of Germany that would recognize Germany as a Kulturnation, but would also recognize Austria as having a privileged place within such a federal state and the existence of an Austrian nation within the German Kulturnation.

The Austrian Civil War of 12–15 February 1934, also known as the "February Uprising" or the "February Fights", was a series of clashes in the First Austrian Republic between the forces of the authoritarian right-wing government of Engelbert Dollfuss and the Republican Protection League (Republikanischer Schutzbund), the banned paramilitary arm of the Social Democratic Workers' Party of Austria. The fighting started when League members fired on the Austrian police who were attempting to enter the Social Democrats' party headquarters in Linz to search for weapons. It spread from there to Vienna and other industrial centres in eastern and central Austria. The superior numbers and firepower of the Austrian police and Federal Army quickly put an end to the uprising. The overall death toll is estimated at 350.

The socialists' defeat led to arrests, executions and the banning of the Social Democratic Party. In May 1934, Austria's democratic constitution was replaced by the Austrofascist constitution of the Federal State of Austria, with the Fatherland Front as the only legal party

The Dollfuss/Schnuschnigg government did not deny that Austrians were Germans but opposed annexation into Germany especially under the Nazi regime. According to the estimates of the Austrian government, with the voting age of 24, about 70 % of Austrians would have voted to preserve the Austrian independence. After the Wehrmacht troops entered Austria to enforce the Anschluss, the Nazis held a controlled plebiscite (Volksabstimmung) in the whole Reich within the following month, asking the people to ratify the fait accompli, and claimed that 99.75 % of the votes cast in Austria were in favor. In case of a fair plebiscite, the Anschluss would have been supported only by 20 % of the Austrian population. The relationship between Austrian Catholicism, national identity, and fascism has been a source of controversy. After the fall of Nazi Germany and the events from this and World War II, Austrians began to develop a more distinct national identity. Unlike earlier in the 20th century, in 1987 only 6 % of the Austrians identified themselves as "Germans". In 2008, over 90 % of the Austrians saw themselves as an independent nation.

== Nationalist parties ==
- Fatherland Front (Austria)
- Freedom Party of Austria

== Personalities ==
- Engelbert Dollfuss
- Ernst Rüdiger Starhemberg
- Kurt Schuschnigg

== See also ==
- German nationalism
- Austria-Hungary
- Austrian Empire
- Austrians
- Hallstatt culture
- Holy Roman Empire
- Similar cases such as
  - Moldovan nationalism
  - Montenegrin nationalism
  - Taiwanese nationalism
- Related nationalisms and patriotisms
  - Austria-Hungary
  - Bavarian nationalism
  - Bosniak nationalism
  - Croatian nationalism
  - Czech nationalism
  - Czechoslovakism
  - German nationalism
    - German nationalism in Austria
  - Hungarian nationalism
  - Italian nationalism
  - Serbian nationalism
  - Slovenian nationalism
  - Yugoslavism
