= Michael Swierczek =

German politician

Michael Swierczek (born 1961 in Hanover) is a German politician who lives in Munich.

Swierczek began his political career as a member of the Young National Democratic Party of Germany (NPD). He was one of the leaders of the Freien Nationalisten before taking over the leadership of the Munich Kameradschaft of the Action Front of National Socialists/National Activists (ANS/NA). Swierczek then threw his lot in with the Free German Workers' Party (FAP), serving that group as both Vice General Secretary and chair of the FAP-Landesverbandes Bayern.

Swierczek split from the FAP in 1990 and formed his own group, National Offensive, in Augsburg on 3 July. Although claiming only around 140 members the group became an important source of propaganda and as leader Swierczek became an important figure in historical revisionism, organising events that featured David Irving and other leading figures as speakers. However this group, which was mostly active in Bavaria and Saxony, was banned by the Federal Minister of the Interior on 22 December 1992.

Following the outlawing of National Offensive, Swierczek continued in his attempts to organise extremist movements. After attempting to reconvene the ANS/NA he was tried before the Stuttgart regional court and, on 7 May 1995, was sentenced to 15 months' imprisonment for trying to restart this banned group. He has subsequently returned to the NPD.
