= Friedhelm Busse =

German neo-Nazi

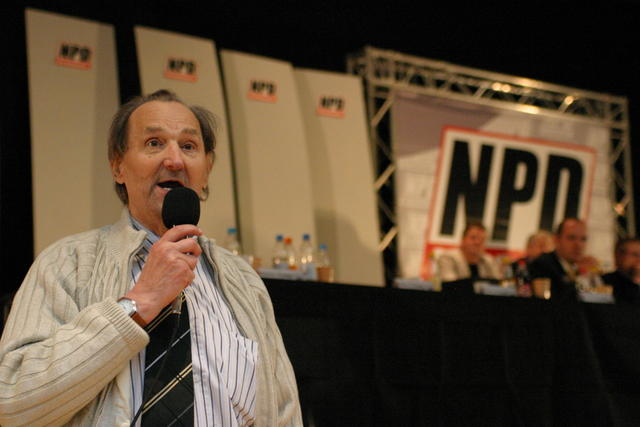
- Busse in 2006
- Born: Friedhelm Busse; 4 February 1929; Bochum, Weimar Germany
- Died: 23 July 2008 (aged 79); Passau, Germany
- Occupation: Politician
- Organization: 12th SS Panzer Division Hitlerjugend
- Known for: Neo-Nazi activist
- Political party: Free German Workers' Party
- Movement: Volkssozialistische Bewegung Deutschlands

Friedhelm Busse (4 February 1929 – 23 July 2008) was a German neo-Nazi politician and activist. In a career taking in some six decades Busse established himself as a leading voice of German neo-Nazism.

== Early activism ==
The son of an SA Sturmbannführer, Busse was born in Bochum and served in the 12th SS Panzer Division Hitlerjugend in 1945. After the war Busse served in the Bund Deutscher Jugend, a semi-clandestine anti-Soviet Union paramilitary squad exposed in the German press as a front operation for the CIA in 1952. In 1953, Busse was arrested and later sentenced to six weeks in prison for aiding and abetting deprivation of liberty. He then became active in Reichsjugend, the youth wing of the Socialist Reich Party and later the Deutsche Reichspartei. During the early 1960s he took an active role in terrorism in the majority-German speaking Italian province of South Tyrol, and was arrested in 1963 for possession of dynamite.

== VSBD ==
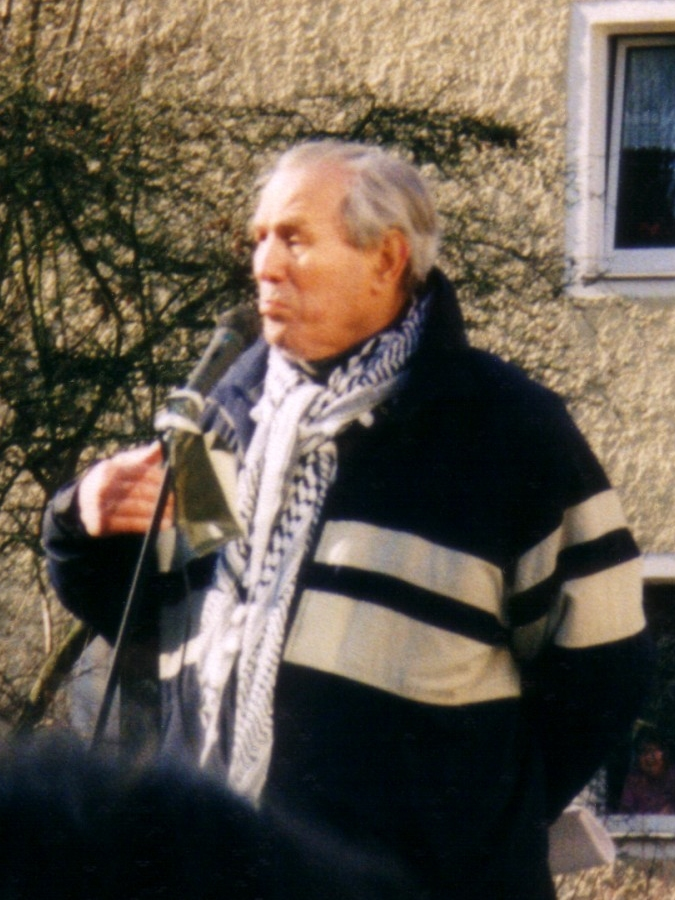
Friedhelm Busse in 2001

Busse joined the National Democratic Party of Germany (NPD) in 1964 and soon became one of the party's leading members in North Rhine-Westphalia. As a member of the NPD Busse became associated with student radicalism, much to the displeasure of the NPD leadership. To this end he set up a radical far right group, Aktion Widerstand, in 1970 and was expelled from the party the following year as the leadership sought to reassert itself. This followed a conviction for weapons offences, also in 1971.

In June 1971 he joined with other radicals in setting up the Partei der Arbeit/Deutsche Sozialisten, which re-emerged in 1975 as Volkssozialistische Bewegung Deutschlands (VSBD). He had worked closely with the groups counterparts in France, Fédération d'action nationale et européenne, in order to increase international co-operation. Alongside this he continued to play a leading role in the VSBD until it was outlawed in 1982 following a shooting incident with Munich police in which two VSBD gunmen were killed and two police officers injured. The group had been involved in a number of bank robberies during the summer of 1981 but this incident, which occurred in November 1981, represented the end of this fundraising initiative. Busse was sentenced to six years imprisonment at his 1983 trial after being found guilty of charges of illegal possession of weapons and receiving stolen goods.

== Free German Workers Party ==
Busse then became associated with the Free German Workers' Party (FAP), becoming leader of the party in November 1988 when Michael Kühnen was forced from that position due to his homosexuality. Kühnen had been opposed by Jürgen Mosler, the fiercely homophobic leader of the party's North Rhine-Westphalia group and Busse had thrown his lot in with him in order to emerge as leader. Busse and Mosler themselves soon clashed however, resulting in a further split in the party. In keeping with his ideological roots Busse sought to reinvigorate the party by turning it towards Strasserism with which he had long been associated.

However the FAP declined as successor groups loyal to Kühnen emerged, with FAP membership as low as 220 people by 1992.

== Later years ==
With the FAP on the wane he became involved with organising Freien Kameradschaften but was caught by police in Stuttgart in 1994 and placed on 20 months probation for attempting to reorganise the banned Action Front of National Socialists/National Activists.

Busse died on 23 July 2008 in Passau. German officials dug up his grave to remove a Reichskriegsflagge that had been placed on his casket at the time of burial.
