= National Offensive =

German neo-Nazi party

The National Offensive (German: Nationale Offensive; abbreviated NO) was a German neo-Nazi party, which existed from 3 July 1990 to 22 December 1992.

It was founded by Michael Swierczek, the former chairman of the Free German Workers' Party (FAP) in Bavaria, who became the chairman of the NO, and Carlo Bauer, the president of the NO, during the collapse of the FAP for disappointed - mostly Bavarian - members of that party.

The focus of the platform of the NO was its fight against immigrants. It considered the blending of cultures to be genocide, and therefore called for the deportation of foreigners, tightening of German asylum laws, and making it more difficult to attain German nationality.

The NO was unable to receive enough signatures to participate in the Bavarian Landtag elections on 14 October 1990. In February 1991, Swierczek and Christian Malcoci, another NO member, were charged with the continuation of the Action Front of National Socialists/National Activists (ANS/NA), which had been banned in 1983. By 1991, it reached a membership of around 100, as it was able to recruit members from outside Bavaria. As the party was able to gain more members in Eastern Germany, the membership increased to around 140 by 1992. From Eastern Germany, the party tried to establish contacts to the German-speaking population in Silesia, Poland, in order to establish a state organization there.

While the former SS-member Josef Schwammberger was on trial for war crimes from 1991 to 1992, the NO publicly supported him. In 1992, the NO organized a series of lectures with the British Holocaust denier David Irving, who had been introduced to the NO by Christian Worch. The party took part in the 1992 Landtag elections in Baden-Württemberg, but only received a total of 183 votes, since it was only on the ballot in Konstanz and Singen.

On 22 December 1992, the NO was banned by the Ministry of the Interior, just one day after the ban of the Deutscher Kameradschaftsbund (DKB), and within a month of the bans of the German Alternative (DA) and the Nationalist Front (NF). The then Minister of the Interior, Rudolf Seiters, stated that the ban had been passed as the NO was an "aggressive neo-Nazi organization" that had agitated against foreigners, Jews and Israel. The residences of about 30 party members were searched and information materials, party documents, and floppy disks were seized by police. At the time the NO had regional organizations in Bavaria, Berlin-Brandenburg, and Saxony.
