= North Tyrol =

Part of the Austrian state of Tyrol

Coordinates: 47.472°N 10.621°E

Map of the Euroregion Tyrol-South Tyrol-Trentino

North Tyrol, rarely North Tirol (German: Nordtirol), is the main part of the Austrian state Tyrol, located in the western part of the country. The other part of the state is East Tyrol, which also belongs to Austria but shares no border with North Tyrol.

Besides those two regions, the historical region of Tyrol for many centuries also included South Tyrol and the historical region of Welschtirol, which were annexed by Italy after World War I. With that, North Tyrol and East Tyrol were effectively cut off from each other. In the aftermath of World War I, there was a serious movement to unify North Tyrol with Bavaria.

North Tyrol borders Salzburg State in the east, the German state of Bavaria in the north, Vorarlberg to the west, the Swiss canton of Graubünden (Grison) to the southwest, and South Tyrol in Italy to the south. The state capital Innsbruck is located in North Tyrol.

== See also ==
- Tyrol
- Tyrol (state)
- States of Austria
- Tyrol–South Tyrol–Trentino Euroregion
- Research: Archeology in North Tyrol, roemarch.badw.de/en
