= Bavarian nationalism =

Political ideology asserting the shared cultural unity of Bavarians

One of the two flags of Bavaria

Bavarian nationalism is a nationalist political ideology that asserts that Bavarians are a nation and promotes the cultural unity of Bavarians. It has been a strong phenomenon since the incorporation of the Kingdom of Bavaria into the German Empire in 1871. Bavarian nationalists find the terms that Bavaria entered into Germany in 1871 to be controversial and claimed that the German government has long intruded on the desired autonomy of Bavaria, and calls have been made for Bavarian independence.

After the defeat of Germany in World War I, Bavarian nationalism grew in strength, becoming popular amongst both revolutionary and reactionary political movements. Following the collapse of Austria-Hungary after World War I, proposals for Austria to join Bavaria were made. At this time the Bavarian government held particular interest in incorporating the regions of North Tyrol and Upper Austria into Bavaria. This was a serious issue in the aftermath of World War I, with significant numbers of Austria's North Tyrolese declaring their intention to have North Tyrol join Bavaria.

== History ==
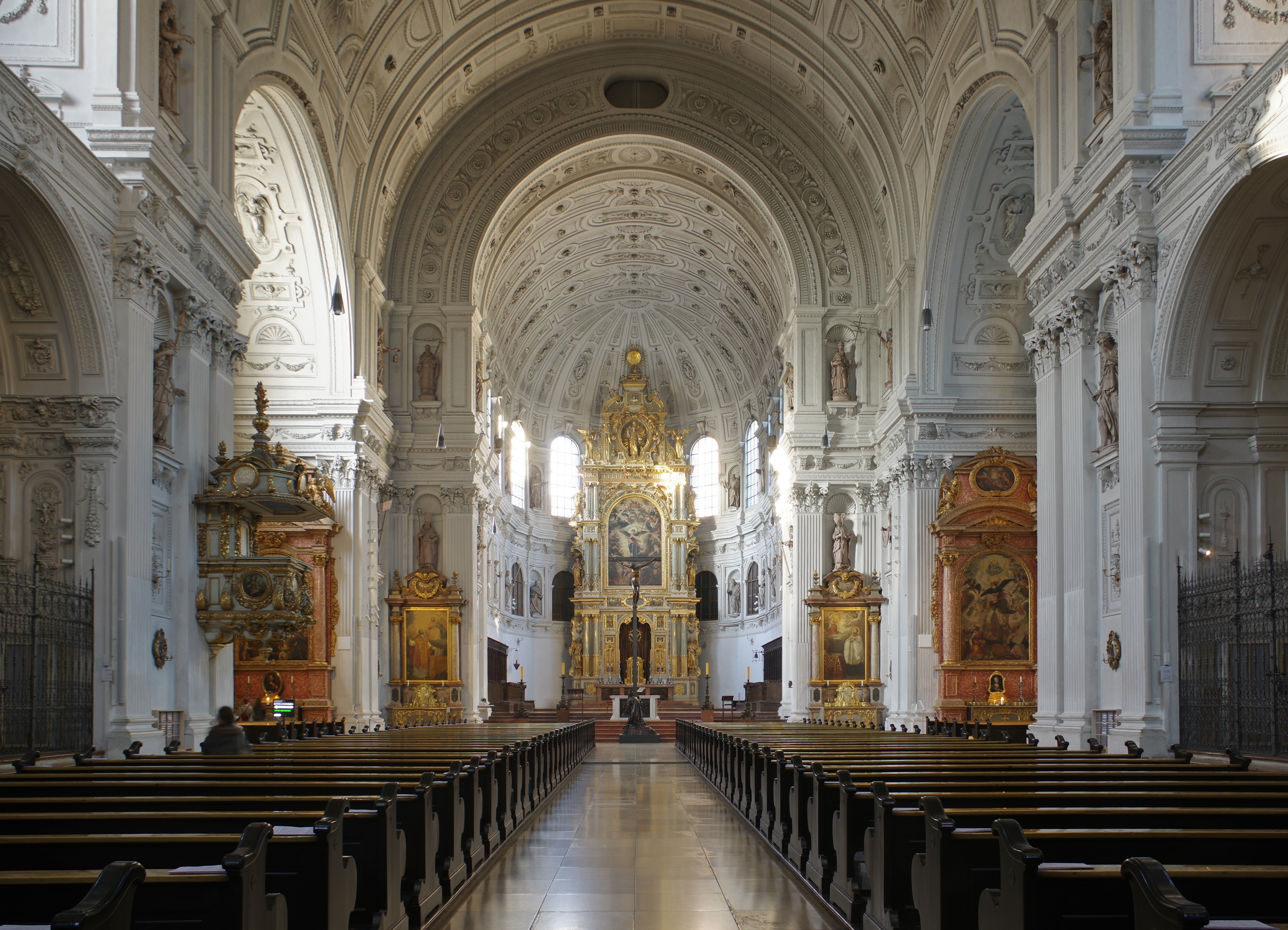
St. Michael's Church, an important Catholic Christian church in Munich

The origins of the rise of Bavarian nationalism as a strong political movement were in the Austro-Prussian War and its aftermath. Bavaria was politically and culturally closer to Catholic Austria than Protestant Prussia, and the Bavarians shared with the Austrians a common contempt towards the Prussians, which led Bavaria to ally with Austria in the war. Austria, Bavaria and their allies were defeated by Prussia and its allies. In the aftermath, Bavaria paid a large indemnity to Prussia and joined the Prussian-founded German Empire in 1871. After unification with Germany in 1871, Bavarian nationalists were adamantly opposed to the Prussian domination of the German state and refused further integration into the German Empire.

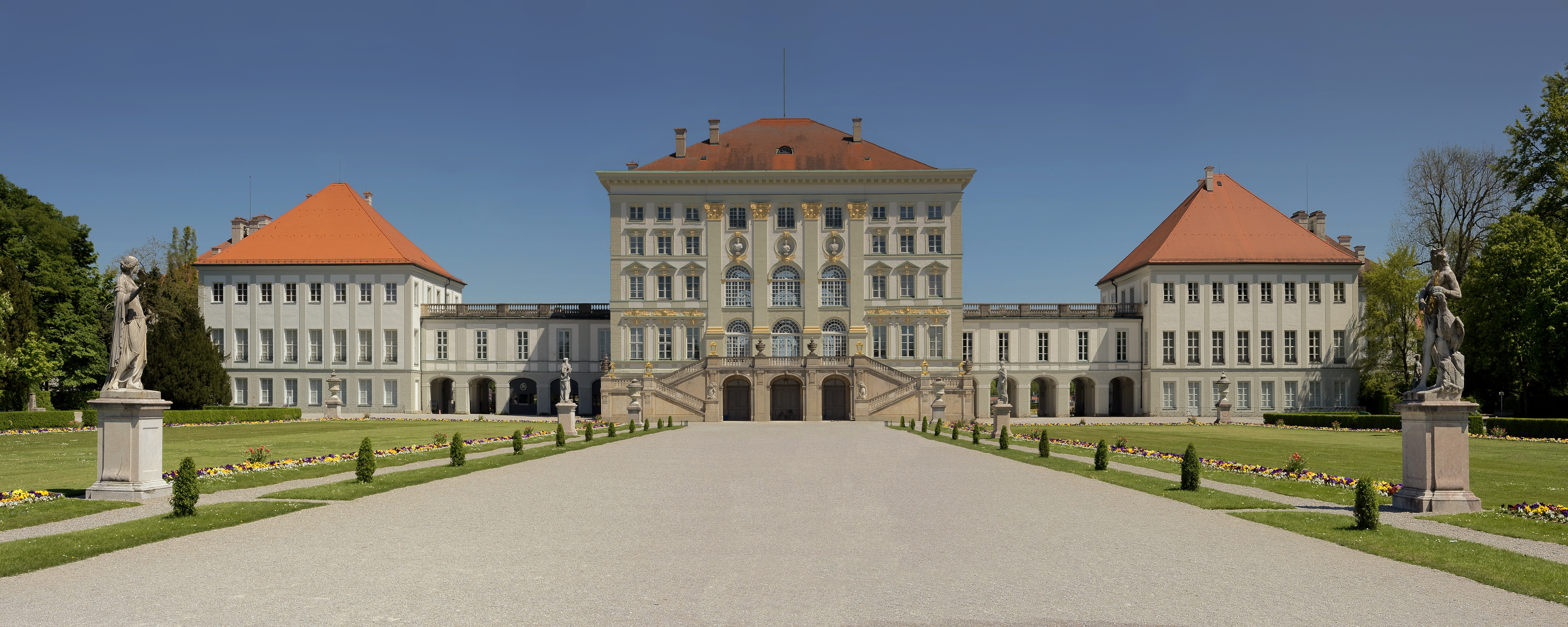
Nymphenburg Palace in Munich, one of the major palaces of the historic rulers of Bavaria

Upon Germany's defeat in World War I, revolution spread across Germany including Bavaria, with the Bavarian monarchy being toppled and the proclamation of Bavaria as an independent communist state (the Bavarian Soviet Republic). After the collapse of the Soviet Republic, Bavarian nationalism, associated with anti-Prussian as well as antisemitic tendencies, became popular amongst both radical and reactionary movements.

Following the collapse of Austria-Hungary, proposals for Austria to join Bavaria were made. The Bavarian government held particular interest in incorporating the regions of North Tyrol and Upper Austria into Bavaria. Such proposals were taken with interest by significant numbers of North Tyrolese wishing to join Bavaria. The Bavarian government's actions prompted the German government to respond by proposing the Anschluss of Austria into Germany.

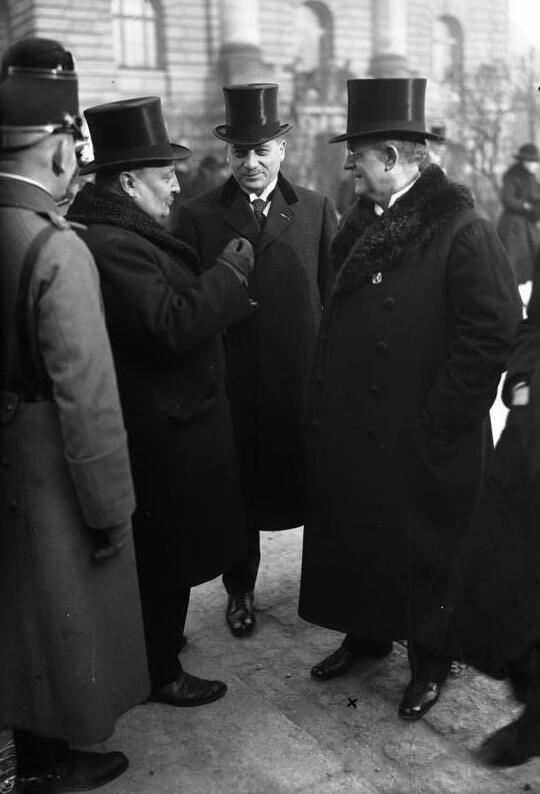
Heinrich Held (right), Minister-President of Bavaria (1924–1933) and leader of the Bavarian People's Party which had Bavarian monarchist and nationalist tendencies

In 1923, the small Nazi Party, in what became known as the Beer Hall Putsch, attempted to take over the Bavarian government as the first step in its planned march on Berlin to overthrow the government of the Weimar Republic. Both attempts failed. Bavarian nationalists and the Nazi Party competed for a support base; however, even by the 1932 election, when the Nazi Party won a major victory, the Nazis had failed to surpass the Catholic Bavarian People's Party in southern Bavaria and carried only the Protestant areas of Franconia.

After the Nazi takeover in Germany, the new government claimed the existence of several Bavarian separatist plots and used these claims to suppress Bavarian opposition, including overthrowing the Bavarian government. Initially, many Bavarians were supportive of Germany's war effort in World War II because it had been portrayed as an anti-communist campaign, but Bavarian support for the war rapidly declined as the end of the war neared. Bavarian nationalism re-emerged in the latter part of the war and sought Allied support for the creation of an independent Bavaria. In the end, major autonomy for Bavaria was accepted within a federal Germany.

During the 1950s, the separatist Bavaria Party was a significant player in Bavarian state politics, polling from 5% to over 20% in state and federal elections. The Bavaria Party was part of the state's governing coalition under Wilhelm Hoegner from 1954 to 1957, along with the Social Democrats and the Free Democratic Party. The party's electoral share fell significantly in subsequent decades. In 2023, the Bavaria Party won 1.1% of the total vote in state elections.

In a 2017 poll by YouGov, 32 percent of Bavarians supported the idea of independence.

== See also ==
- Austrian nationalism
- Monarchism in Bavaria after 1918
- German nationalism
- Germans
