= German legal citation =

Standard methods for citation of German legal codes and case law

As in most countries, Germany has a standard way of citing its legal codes and case law; an essentially identical system of citation is also used in Austria.

There is, however, no authoritative citation style similar in importance to the Bluebook (in the United States) or OSCOLA (in the United Kingdom). Legal journals use self-made "house" citation styles, and the most influential style guide probably are the Author's Instructions of the Neue Juristische Wochenschrift, arguably the most important legal journal in Germany.

== Citing portions of the German legal code ==
As an example, the famous or notorious Paragraph 175, which formerly made male homosexuality a crime in Germany, would most properly be cited in an English-language text as "§ 175 StGB (Germany)". "§" simply denotes "paragraph" (and can be pluralized as "§§"). "StGB" stands for Strafgesetzbuch (penal code); other similar usages would be "BGB" (Bürgerliches Gesetzbuch, the Civil Code) and "ZPO" (Zivilprozessordnung, the Civil Procedure Code). Paragraphs with the same number from these different codes are completely unrelated; thus, § 175 ZPO has nothing to do with § 175 StGB.

Finally, unless the context is clear, "(Germany)" may be added to distinguish this from the similar system of citation for Austria; again, paragraphs with the same number in German and Austrian legal codes are unrelated, except in laws that were introduced in Austria with the Anschluss in 1938, such as the AktG (Stock Corporations Act), which, of course, has frequently been amended in different ways in both countries since then. A method that is sometimes employed in Austrian legal writing to distinguish between Austrian and German law is to add a lower case "d" for Germany (German: Deutschland) and an "ö" for Austria (German: Österreich) before the abbreviation of the respective code, e.g. "dAktG" and "öAktG" referring to the German and Austrian stock corporations acts.

Within such a paragraph, there may be numerous Absätze (singular Absatz, i.e. "passages", "sections"). The Absätze are cited as "Abs.". Thus, a particular portion of Paragraph 175 might be cited as "§ 175 Abs. 2 StGB (Germany)". Texts addressed at a purely legal audience commonly make use of an informal shorthand, abbreviating Absätze for example as Roman numerals. Thus, in such texts, this same provision might be cited simply as "§ 175 II StGB" or even "§ 175 II" depending on the amount of available context. In Austria, the Absätze are usually cited as "Abs" (without a dot), e.g. "§ 1295 Abs 2 ABGB". Occasionally parentheses are used instead, e.g. "§ 1295 (2) ABGB. Numbered lists are cited with a capital "Z" (standing for Ziffer i.e. number), e.g. "§ 73 Abs 1 Z 4 BWG". By contrast, in Germany, the abbreviation "Nr." (standing for Nummer i.e. number) is used instead.

In non-legal contexts, for example in text formatting, the word Absatz would normally be equivalent to English "paragraph", but in legal usage an Absatz is a subdivision of a Paragraph; we must either use the German word or translate it as "sub-paragraph".

The Basic Law (constitution) of Germany is divided into Artikel or articles, not sections. To cite the Basic Law a notation like "Artikel 1 GG" or "Art. 1 GG", where GG stands for Grundgesetz, basic law, is used.

== Citing German case law ==
The Entscheidungen des Bundesgerichtshofs in Strafsachen (cited as "BGHSt") covers criminal case law in the present-day Federal Republic of Germany that was decided by the Federal Court of Justice (Bundesgerichtshof). Case law from German unification (1871) until 1945, decided by the Empire Court of Justice (Reichsgericht), would be in the Entscheidungen des Reichsgerichts in Strafsachen (cited as "RGSt"). Similarly, decisions in private law can be found in the Entscheidungen des Bundesgerichtshofs in Zivilsachen ("BGHZ") and Entscheidungen des Reichsgerichts in Zivilsachen ("RGZ"). E.g. BGHZ 65, 182 would refer to a case published in BGHZ, volume 65, beginning at page 182.

Alternatively, cases may be cited to law reviews where they have been rendered, e.g. BGH, NJW 1982, 473. Ideally, the date of the court decision and the docket number should be given before the citation, but whether this is required usually depends on the publisher.

A third type (yet not too widely spread) is the citation by using the European Case Law Identifier, a "neutral" citation system introduced by the Council of the European Union in 2011, which Germany is participating in.

It is not general practice to cite case names, since the names of parties are anonymized. However, in some areas of law (e.g. corporate law), where the name of a party (usually the company involved in the case) is generally known, some cases have gained notoriety under that name (e.g. the Holzmüller decision). Other cases, especially in criminal law, have become known under names emphasising the peculiar story that made them notorious, such as the Cat King Case or the Guben Prosecution. In such cases, it may be helpful for readers to render that name, even though it is entirely optional and such case names are not official.

== Austrian case law ==
Similar rules apply to Austrian case law. Decisions by the Supreme Court (Oberster Gerichtshof) can be cited to the official collections (SZ for private law and SSt for criminal law) or to law reviews. In the case of the official collections, other than in Germany, the cite normally does not refer to the page number, but to the number of the case, e.g. SZ 82/123 (referring to case number 123 in volume 82 of the official collection of private law cases).
