= German Alternative =

German neo-Nazi group

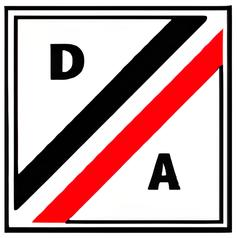

The German Alternative (German: Deutsche Alternative, DA) was a minor Neo-Nazi group set up in Germany by Michael Kühnen in 1989.

== Ideology ==
Its declared goal was the restoration of the German Reich and rejected the cession of German areas in Eastern Europe following World War II and all immigration to Germany, claiming that there were already too many foreigners in the country.

== History ==
The group was a successor to the short-lived Nationale Sammlung, itself set up following Kühnen's removal from the Free German Workers' Party due to his homosexuality. It was constituted as a legal political arm of the Gesinnungsgemeinschaft der Neuen Front (GdNF), Kühnen's more militant neo-Nazi organization. After its founding, it received members from the GdNF, Republicans and the National Democratic Party of Germany (NPD). The complete leadership of the NPD in Berlin and Brandenburg defected to the DA in 1991.

The group organized under the name Nationale Alternative (National Alternative) in the former East Germany, with Ingo Hasselbach as leader. This guise of the DA organized militia training camps in East Berlin and established close links with other groups and with international figures such as Gary Lauck. However, after around a year of intense activity, this arm of the DA fell apart.

After Kühnen's AIDS-related death in 1991, Frank Hübner became the organization's new chairman, while Rene Koswig assumed the role as deputy. Both hail from East Germany. This led about eighty members, primarily from the western part of the country, leaving the DA to start the Deutsches Hessen, Nationaler Block, Volkstreue Liste, and Deutscher Weg.

The group was banned in 1992 as were the Nationalist Front and National Offensive following an arson attack on an asylum seekers refuge in Mölln, Schleswig-Holstein. At the time, it had 340 members and affiliate organizations in Rhineland-Palatinate, Brandenburg, Saxony, Berlin and Bremen. In Cottbus, it even had more members than the Social Democratic Party of Germany. The decree banning it lists three attacks on hostel containing refugees for which DA members were arrested for participating in.
