= Volkssozialistische Bewegung Deutschlands/Partei der Arbeit =

German neo-Nazi organization

People's Socialist Movement of Germany/Labour Party Volkssozialistische Bewegung Deutschlands/Partei der Arbeit
- Abbreviation: VSBD/PdA
- Leader: Friedhelm Busse
- Founded: 17 June 1971
- Banned: 14 January 1982
- Preceded by: Deutsch-Soziale Aktion
- Succeeded by: NF
- Youth wing: Junge Front
- Ideology: Neo-Nazism; Strasserism
- Political position: Far-right

Party flag

The Volkssozialistische Bewegung Deutschlands/Partei der Arbeit (VSBD/PdA; English: People's Socialist Movement of Germany/Labour Party) was a German neo-Nazi organization led by Friedhelm Busse.

Founded in 1971 and banned in 1982, it used a stylized eagle on a shield bearing a stylized Celtic cross and the Wolfsangel as its party emblems. At a time when the far-right in Germany was distancing itself from mainstream Nazism, the VSBD/PdA took the lead by supporting Strasserism, the more socialist-leaning version of Nazism. The Junge Front (Young Front), a youth movement attached to the party, was also organised.

Despite its name, the movement was not a registered party, which allowed the German Minister of the Interior to ban it in 1982 as an organization opposing the constitution. Usage of the stylized Celtic cross was outlawed as well unless used in an innocuous context. Soon afterwards, many of its former members founded the Nationalist Front, which can be seen as a successor to the VSBD/PdA.
