= Nationalist Front (Germany) =

Nationalist Front Nationalistische Front
- Founder: Bernhard Pauli
- Founded: 1985
- Banned: 1992
- Preceded by: Volkssozialistische Bewegung Deutschlands/Partei der Arbeit
- Membership: 150
- Ideology: Strasserism; Neo-Nazism
- Political position: Far-right

The Nationalist Front (German Nationalistische Front) was a minor German neo-Nazi group active during the 1980s.

Founded in 1985 by Bernhard Pauli, the group, which had no more than 150 members, was characterized by its support for Strasserism rather than more usual forms of Nazism. The Nationalist Front – League of Social Revolutionary Nationalists had been formed in 1982 from the ashes of the banned Volkssozialistische Bewegung Deutschlands/Partei der Arbeit. This organisation was the basis for a merger with a number of smaller groups to form a new NF.

In early 1986, the Nationalist Front experienced an internal power struggle, which ended up with a former German soldier and expelled member of the National Democratic Party of Germany, Meinolf Schönborn, replacing Pauli as head of the party.

Based primarily in Bielefeld, the group had a largely Pagan membership, hosting fire rituals and similar ceremonies. The group also performed cross burnings and forged links with Dennis Mahon, the head of the White Knights of the Ku Klux Klan in Tulsa, Oklahoma.

The group also became noted for its armed wing, the National Task Force (Nationales Einsatzkommando – NEK) which was set up in 1991 with the help of Otto Ernst Remer and Herbert Schweiger. This group was blamed for a number of attacks, including burning a man to death in the mistaken belief that he was a Jew and the arson of an asylum seeker hostel in Dolgenbrodt, near Berlin. Firmly antisemitic, the NF was also associated with Jürgen Rieger, the well-known German Holocaust denier who was a speaker at a number of its events. Towards the end of its existence the group came under the leadership of Andreas Pohl, a former Rock Against Communism musician, who attempted to attract the same white power skinheads to the group that he had previously played at.

Its support for the Nazis led to the group being banned by the Federal Ministry of the Interior in 1992 along with the German Alternative of Michael Kühnen and the National Offensive of Michael Swierczek. The ban came in response to an arson attack on 23 November 1992 on the home of a Turkish family in Mölln, Schleswig-Holstein, with the family's deaths injecting urgency into judgements against neo-Nazi groups. The group was succeeded by a number of organisations including Direct Action Middle Germany and the Social Revolutionary Workers Front, all of which were banned.
