= Free German Workers' Party =

Neo-Nazi political party outlawed in Germany in 1995

Free German Workers' Party Freiheitliche Deutsche Arbeiterpartei
- Abbreviation: FAP
- Leader: Martin Pape (1979–1988); Friedhelm Busse (1988–1995)
- Founded: 1979
- Banned: 24 February 1995
- Headquarters: Bonn, Federal Republic of Germany
- Membership (1987): 500
- Ideology: Strasserism; Neo-Nazism
- Political position: Far-right
- Colors: Red, black and white

Party flag

The Free German Workers' Party (German: Freiheitliche Deutsche Arbeiterpartei, FAP) was a neo-Nazi political party in Germany. It was outlawed by the Federal Ministry of the Interior in 1995.

== History ==
The FAP was founded in 1979. However, it was largely insignificant until the banning of the Action Front of National Socialists/National Activists in 1983 when Michael Kühnen encouraged members to infiltrate this tiny group. A minor party (around 500 members in 1987) it experienced something of a growth after German reunification and sought, unsuccessfully, an alliance with the National Democratic Party. It contested the 1987 federal election and the 1989 European elections although in both instances it attracted negligible support.

Tiwaz rune on flag variant of the party

Associated with Strasserism, the FAP party managed to gain some support amongst football hooligans but was damaged by Kühnen's homosexuality, and took a stand against him. The party continued under Friedhelm Busse from 1989 but it lost a number of members to new groups loyal to Kühnen, including the German Alternative (1989) and the National Offensive (1990).

The party was outlawed by the Federal Ministry of the Interior on 24 February 1995.

== Election results ==
=== Federal Parliament (Bundestag) ===
Election	Party list		Seats	+/–	Status
Election	Votes	%	Seats	+/–	Status
1987	405	0.0	0 / 631	New	Extra-parliamentary

=== European Parliament ===
Election	Votes	%	Seats	+/–	EP Group
1989	19,151	0.07 (#16)	0 / 99	▲	NI
