= Far-right politics in Germany =

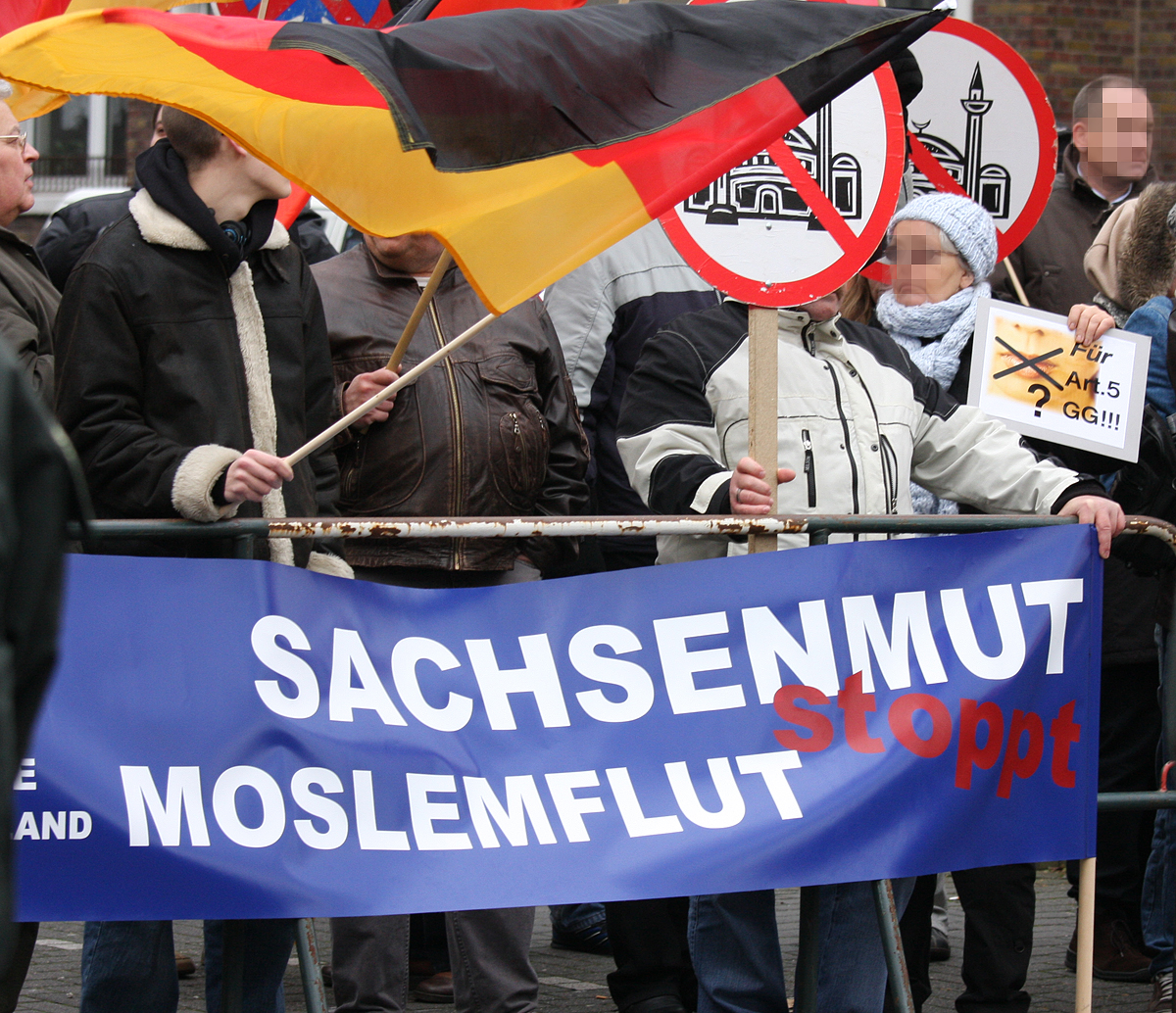
Right-wing populists from the Pro-movement protesting against Islam

The far-right politics in Germany (German: rechtsextrem) slowly reorganised itself after the fall of Nazi Germany and the dissolution and subsequent ban of the Nazi Party in 1945. Denazification was carried out in Germany from 1945 to 1949 by the Allied forces of World War II, with an attempt of eliminating Nazism from the country. However, various far-right parties emerged in the post-war period, with varying success. Most parties only lasted a few years before either dissolving or being banned, and explicitly far-right parties rarely gained seats in the Bundestag (West Germany's and now modern Germany's federal parliament) post-WWII until the 2010s. In the communist state of East Germany, open right-wing radicalism was relatively weak until the 1980s. Later, smaller extremist groups formed (e.g. those associated with football violence).

The most successful far-right party in Germany in the immediate post-war period was the Deutsche Rechtspartei (German Right Party), which attracted former Nazis and won five seats in the 1949 West German federal election and held these seats for four years, before losing them in the 1953 West German federal election. At the 2017 German federal election, the far-right Alternative for Germany (AfD) party won 94 seats and became the largest opposition party in the Bundestag, the first time a far-right party other than the Deutsche Rechtspartei won seats in the Bundestag since the dissolution of the Nazi Party after World War II.

== Definition ==
Far right politics is marked by radical conservatism, authoritarianism, ultra-nationalism, and nativism. "Far-right" is synonymous with the term "extreme right", or literally "right-extremist" (Rechtsextremismus, the term used by German Federal Office for the Protection of the Constitution), according to which neo-Nazism is a subclass, with its historical orientation at Nazism.

== History ==
=== West Germany (1945–1990) ===
In 1946, the Deutsche Rechtspartei was founded and in 1950 succeeded by the Deutsche Reichspartei. As the allied occupation of Germany ended in 1949, a number of new far-right parties emerged: The Socialist Reich Party, founded in 1949, the German Social Union (West Germany), the Free German Workers' Party, Nationalist Front and National Offensive.

In 1964, the National Democratic Party of Germany was founded, which continues to the present day.

The 1980s saw an increase in right wing organization and activity across Western Europe. In 1984-5 the European Parliament organized a Committee of Inquiry into the Rise of Racism and Fascism in Europe; in 1989, another Committee of Inquiry into Racism and Xenophobia. In the report of the second Committee, issued to parliament in October 1990, West German Social Democrat Willi Rothley argued that economic and social changes arising from "modernizing society" were responsible for the recent rise of right-wing extremism, particularly a weakening cohesion among family, work, and religious association leading to a "growing susceptibility to political platforms offering security by emphasizing the national aspect or providing scapegoats (foreigners)."

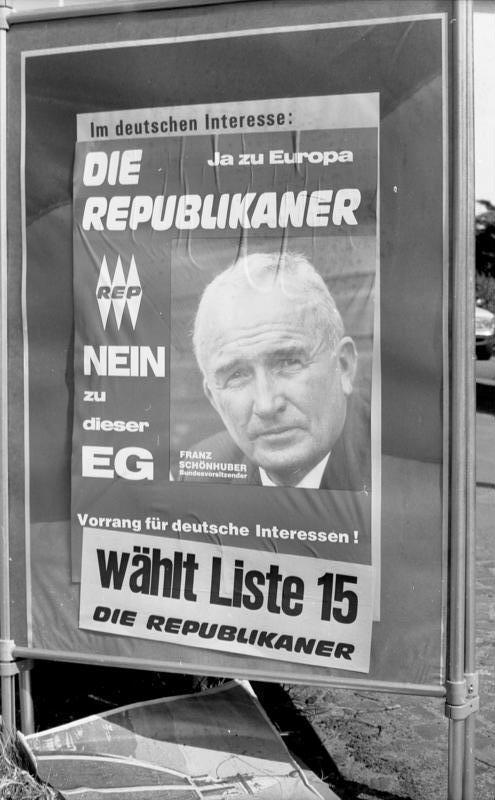
A Republican election poster campaigning for the 1989 European election

The report notes the "meteoric" rise of the Republikaner Partei (REP) in 1989, whose leader Franz Schönhuber had been a member of the Waffen-SS, and who "proudly admits his Nazi past." The party won two million votes in the 1989 European Parliament elections on a platform that "openly advocated the abolition of trade unions, the destruction of social welfare, censorship, and the wholesale 'de-criminalization' of German history. Promoting the expulsion of immigrants and a reunification of Germany to the 1937 borders, the actual reunification of West and East Germany triggered a collapse of the REP's voter base. Until then, Helmut Kohl, as first chancellor of a reunified Germany, refused to guarantee Poland's western boundary. The German State Office for the Protection of the Constitution reported over 38,500 "extreme-rightists" in West Germany in 1989, but this number did not include 1-2 million members of the REP, while the NPD/DVU alliance, which was included, despite having only 27,000 members, won 455,000 votes in the June 1989 European elections. By 1991 a splinter group had formed into the Deutsche Allianz led by Harald Neubauer. After reunification, right-wing activity seems to have shifted primarily to the states of former East Germany, which included violent border incidents after the opening of visa-free travel between Germany and Poland in April 1991.

=== Defunct parties ===
- Deutsche Rechtspartei (1946–1950)
- Socialist Reich Party (1949–1952) banned
- German Party (1947–1961)
- Deutsche Reichspartei (1950–1964)
- German Social Union (1956–1962)
- Free German Workers' Party (1979–1995) banned
- Nationalist Front (1985–1992) banned
- German Alternative (1989–1992) banned
- National Offensive (1990–1992) banned

=== East Germany (1945–1990) ===
East Germany (GDR) was founded under a different pretext than West Germany. As a socialist state, it was based on the idea that fascism was an extreme form of capitalism. Thus, it understood itself as an anti-fascist state (Article 6 of the GDR constitution) and anti-fascist and anti-colonialist education played an important role in schools and in ideological training at universities. In contrast to West Germany, organizations of the Nazi regime had always been condemned and their crimes openly discussed as part of the official state doctrine in the GDR. Thus, in the GDR, there was no room for a movement similar to the 1968 movement in West Germany, and GDR opposition groups did not see the topic as a major issue. Open right-wing radicalism was relatively weak until the 1980s. Later, smaller extremist groups formed (e.g. those associated with football violence). The government attempted to address the issue, but at the same time had ideological reasons not to do so openly as it conflicted with the self-image of a socialist society. The cultural isolation and ethnic homogeneity of the "closed" East German society later contributed to a disproportionate prevalence of right-wing extremism in the new Bundesländer.

=== Germany (since 1990) ===
NPD Vote share in 2013 elections

In 1991, one year after German reunification, German neo-Nazis attacked accommodations for refugees and migrant workers in Hoyerswerda (Hoyerswerda riots), Schwedt, Eberswalde, Eisenhüttenstadt and Elsterwerda, and in 1992, xenophobic riots broke out in Rostock-Lichtenhagen. Neo-Nazis were involved in the murders of three Turkish girls in the 1992 Mölln arson attack in Schleswig-Holstein, in which nine other people were injured.

German statistics show that in 1991, there were 849 hate crimes; in 1992 there were 1,485 concentrated in the eastern Bundesländer. After 1992, the numbers decreased, although they rose sharply in subsequent years. In four decades of the former East Germany, 17 people were murdered by far right groups.

A 1993 arson attack by far-right skinheads on the house of a Turkish family in Solingen resulted in the deaths of two women and three girls, as well as in severe injuries for seven other people. In the aftermath, anti-racist protests precipitated massive neo-Nazi counter-demonstrations and violent clashes between neo-Nazis and anti-fascists.

In 1995, the fiftieth anniversary of the Bombing of Dresden in World War II, a radical left group, the Anti-Germans, started an annual rally praising the bombing on the grounds that so many of the city's civilians had supported Nazism. Beginning in the late 1990s and early 2000s, Neo-Nazis started holding demonstrations on the same date. In 2009, the Junge Landsmannschaft Ostdeutschland youth group and the NPD organised a march but surrounded by policemen, the 6,000 neo-Nazis were not allowed to leave their meeting point. At the same time, some 15,000 people with white roses assembled in the streets holding hands to demonstrate against Nazism, and to create an alternative “memorial day” of war victims.

In 2004, the National Democratic Party of Germany won 9.2% in the Saxony state election, 2004, and 1.6% of the nationwide vote in the German federal election, 2005. In the Mecklenburg-Vorpommern state election, 2006 the NPD received 7.3% of the vote and thus also state representation. In 2004, the NPD had 5,300 registered party members. Over the course of 2006, the NPD processed roughly 1,000 party applications which put the total membership at 7,000. The DVU has 8,500 members.

In 2007, the Verfassungsschutz (Federal German intelligence) estimated the number of potentially right extremist individuals in Germany was 31,000 of which about 10,000 were classified as potentially violent (gewaltbereit).

In 2008, unknown perpetrators smashed cars with Polish registrations and breaking windows in Löcknitz, a German town near the Polish city Szczecin, where about 200 Poles live. Supporters of the NPD party were suspected to be behind anti-Polish incidents, per Gazeta Wyborcza.

In 2011, the National Socialist Underground was finally exposed in being behind the murders of 10 people of Turkish origins between 2000 and 2007.

In 2011, Federal German intelligence reported 25,000 right-wing extremists, including 5,600 neo-Nazis. In the same report, 15,905 crimes committed in 2010 were classified as far-right motivated, compared to 18,750 in 2009; these crimes included 762 acts of violence in 2010 compared to 891 in 2009. While the overall numbers had declined, the Verfassungsschutz indicated that both the number of neo-Nazis and the potential for violent acts have increased, especially among the growing number of Autonome Nationalisten ("Independent Nationalists") who gradually replace the declining number of Nazi Skinheads.

In the 2014 European Parliament election, the NPD won their first ever seat in the European Parliament with 1% of the vote. Jamel, Germany is a village known to be heavily populated with neo-Nazis.

According to interior ministry figures reported in May 2019, of an estimated 24,000 far-right extremists in the country, 12,700 Germans are inclined towards violence. Extremists belonging to Der Dritte Weg (the third way) marched through a town in Saxony on 1 May, the day before the Jewish remembrance of the Holocaust, carrying flags and a banner saying "Social justice instead of criminal foreigners". In 2020, Deutsches Reichsbräu beer with neo-Nazi imagery was sold in Bad Bibra on Holocaust Memorial Day.

In October 2019, the city council of Dresden passed a motion declaring a "Nazi emergency", signalling that there is a serious problem with the far right in the city.

In February 2020, following an observation of a conspiratorial meeting of a dozen right-wing extremists, those involved were arrested after agreeing to launch attacks on mosques in Germany to trigger a civil war.

The National Democratic Party (NPD) in Germany has made efforts to be incorporated into the environmental movement in an effort to attract new members amongst the younger generations. They have published conservation magazines including Umwelt und Aktiv (Environment and Active). This magazine and others of its kind incorporate both environmentalism and tips as well as far-right propaganda and rhetoric. It's argued by an anonymous member of the Centre for Democratic Culture that this endeavor is in part a rebranding of the NPD. They argue that the party is attempting to become associated with environmentalism and not politics.

In the 2024 Thuringian state election, the Alternative for Germany (AfD) became the first far-right party in Germany since the Nazi Party to win a plurality of seats in a state election.

=== Support from the East ===
Second vote share percentage for the AfD in the 2013 federal election in Germany, final results

Second vote share percentage for the AfD in the 2017 federal election in Germany, final results

AfD in the 2024 European Parliament election in Germany

2025 German federal election support for the AfD by percentage

After 1990, far-right and German nationalist groups gained followers, particularly among young people frustrated by the high unemployment and the poor economic situation. Der Spiegel also points out that these people are primarily single men and that there may also be socio-demographic reasons. Since around 1998 the support for right-wing parties shifted from the south of Germany to the east.

The far-right party German People's Union (DVU) formed in 1998 in Saxony-Anhalt and Brandenburg since 1999. In 2009, the party lost its representation in the Landtag of Brandenburg.

The far-right National Democratic Party of Germany (NPD) was represented in the Saxon State Parliament from 2004 to 2014. In Mecklenburg-Vorpommern the NPD losts its representation in the parliament following the 2016 state elections. In 2009, Junge Landsmannschaft Ostdeutschland, supported by the NPD, organized a march on the anniversary of the Bombing of Dresden in World War II. There were 6,000 Nationalists which were met by tens of thousands of ″anti-Nazis″ and several thousand policemen.

Pegida has its focus in eastern Germany. A survey by TNS Emnid reports that in mid-December 2014, 53% of East Germans in each case sympathised with the PEGIDA demonstrators. (48% in the West)

The Alternative for Germany (Alternative für Deutschland; AfD) had the most votes in the new states of Germany in the 2013 German federal elections, in 2017. and in 2021 elections. The party is seen as harbouring anti-immigration views.

In 2016, the AfD reached at least 17% in Saxony-Anhalt, Mecklenburg-Western Pomerania (where the NPD lost all seats) and Berlin.

In 2015, Rhineland-Palatinate interior minister Roger Lewentz said the former communist states were "more susceptible" to "xenophobic radicalization" because former East Germany had not had the same exposure to foreign people and cultures over the decades that the people in the West of the country have had.

A 2017 study found that East Germans were more prone to hold right-wing extremist and xenophobic views, due to low exposure to ethnic minorities, the cultural isolation of the "closed" East German communist society, and a resulting exaggerated need for "harmony, purity and order". The study also identified a sense of collective victimhood about the pace of post-reunification economic progress, their status in relation to West Germans, and the 1945 bombing of Dresden. The authors noted, however, that ideas, money and leaders from western Germany (including Björn Höcke and Alexander Gauland) had served to "professionalise" the eastern far-right.

In 2018 the eastern state of Saxony saw the anti-immigration Chemnitz protests after a fatal stabbing by a Kurdish man.

In the 2017 federal election, the AfD received approximately 22% of the votes in the East and approximately 11% in the West.

In the 2021 federal election, the AfD emerged as the largest in the states of Saxony and Thuringia, and saw a strong performance in eastern Germany.

In the 2025 federal election, the AfD emerged as the largest party in all five former East German states.

== Individuals ==
- Björn Höcke (born 1972), leader of the Thuringia Alternative for Germany (AfD)
- Udo Voigt (1952–2025), former leader of the National Democratic Party of Germany (NPD) from 1996 to 2011
- Christian Worch (born 1956), Chairman of the now-defunct far-right political party Die Rechte.
- Michael Kühnen (1955–1991)

== State apparatus ==
Right-wing extremist attitudes in state authorities such as the federal and state police, the Armed Forces, the judiciary and the Office for the Protection of the Constitution are not recorded statistically or systematically in Germany. Since around 2015, more incidents with right-wing extremist references and the beginnings of right-wing extremist networks in state authorities have become known. Since 2016, a number of criminologists, social scientists and journalists have been investigating this phenomenon more intensively. They criticise the lack of profession-specific surveys, which allowed the responsible supervisory bodies and ministries to adopt stereotypical defensive reaction patterns, such as "the same standard phrase about regrettable individual cases".

=== Police ===
==== Bavaria ====
In November 2018, a female student filed a complaint of rape against a Bavarian police officer. In January 2019, investigators found a WhatsApp group of 42 former and active members of the Munich police support squad (USK) on his and other mobile phones. In it, they had shared a video showing the brutal use of a Taser and another that denigrated Jews in an antisemitic way. In addition, one USK officer had saved pictures of swastika smearings on his mobile phone that were not supposed to appear in the chat. Furthermore, two USK officers are said to have deliberately injured two colleagues with a stun gun during Taser training. The USK had been known since the 1980s for its often brutal operations at demonstrations organised by the anti-nuclear movement. Some cases of police violence from the USK had been reported and punished. In May 2014, a USK officer stuck two stickers with neo-Nazi slogans ("Good Night Left Side" and "Anti-Antifa organizing ...") on his police bus. The USK has often had to protect neo-Nazi marches. In 2016, USK officers subjected protesters against a Nazi rally to a strip search, during which they had to strip naked and be humiliated. The European Court of Human Rights later ruled in favour of one of those affected. The current case only became known in March 2019. The Ministry of the Interior stated that four USK officers were suspended immediately and a further eight were transferred. The supervisory authorities did not announce any specific follow-up measures. By March 2020, eleven USK officers had been forcibly transferred, disciplinary proceedings had been opened against 15 and one had been punished for incitement to hatred. Two criminal proceedings on suspicion of violating official secrets were still ongoing.

==== Berlin ====
In 2015, the far-right blog "Halle Leaks" published excerpts from Berlin police investigation files containing the names and addresses of visitors and residents of a squat in the Rigaer Straße. At the time, they also investigated whether police officers could have leaked the data. The perpetrators were not found and the investigation was closed. At the end of December 2017, six left-wing organisations in Berlin, including the house on Rigaer Straße, received a letter containing the private data of 42 people from that part of the city: personal photos, names, addresses, nicknames, favourite travel destinations, pets and illnesses. The photos came from police files, the official population register, identity card applications and arrests. They were all stored in the Berlin police database. The anonymous author or authors threatened to pass the data on to the far-right Identitarian Movement, autonomous nationalists or the police. They accused the recipients, who did not know each other, of belonging to a tightly organised radical left-wing group and referred to a poster with portrait photos of Berlin police officers that the left-wing portal Indymedia had published four days earlier after the eviction of the house in Rigaer Straße. It was therefore suspected that police officers had illegally passed the material on to third parties or sent the letters themselves. Following a criminal complaint by the Berlin data protection commissioner, the police handed over the internal investigation to the Berlin public prosecutor's office. The latter found out that a female detective inspector, responsible for politically motivated crime – left-wing in the State Office of Criminal Investigation, had searched the police system for data that appeared shortly afterwards in the threatening letters. Her partner, a police commissioner, had a USB stick with the photos and personal data of the recipients. He had collected them privately for years and then, according to his own statements, used them as revenge for Indymedia's "manhunt" for the threatening letters. As he had previously worked as an undercover investigator in Berlin's left-wing scene and had been exposed by left-wing activists, it is also suspected that he was seeking revenge. In 2019, he received a fine for a data protection offence and was transferred to Berlin-Friedrichshain, where many of the recipients of his letters live.

==== Mecklenburg-Western Pomerania ====
In January 2016, police inspector Marco G. founded a prepper group in Mecklenburg-Western Pomerania called Nordkreuz, whose 60 to 70 members prepared for an expected collapse of the state order on "Day X" with weapons, ammunition and food depots as well as shooting exercises. Among them were many members of the police and Bundeswehr. Some leaders kept lists of enemies with tens of thousands of names. The group also procured body bags and slaked lime. In 2019, Marco G. received a suspended sentence for his collection of weapons and ammunition.

==== Lower Saxony ====
In 2016, a former member of the far-right political party Alternative for Germany federal executive board passed on information from a classified report by the Federal Criminal Police Office, including on refugee numbers, to party friends by email. The man wrote the email as an administrative officer in the Osnabrück police headquarters. It remains unclear how he obtained the data.

==== North Rhine-Westphalia ====
In North Rhine-Westphalia (NRW), investigators discovered a chat group in the Aachen-West police station in January 2020 whose members were exchanging racist images, such as a black man with wide open eyes and the sentence "The social welfare office is broke, starting today we will work" or a photo of an imperial eagle with a swastika. Investigation proceedings were initiated against three police officers.

In February 2020, the Federal Public Prosecutor General's Office found a right-wing extremist chat group during its investigation into the right-wing terrorist Group S. In it, Chief Superintendent Thorsten W. (member of the S. group and informant on their terror plans), another police officer at Hamm police headquarters and an administrative officer had been exchanging far-right messages for years, such as swastikas, SS runes, skulls, information on where to order bed linen with Nazi symbols without being observed, racist slogans and Nazi propaganda. They joked about wanting to shoot foreigners. As media research showed, Thorsten W. had clearly demonstrated his far-right views at his police station in Bockum-Hövel and gathered official information about the Reichsbürger scene, to which he himself belonged. State Interior Minister Herbert Reul then appointed external extremism officers in all police headquarters in North Rhine-Westphalia to make it easier for police officers to report anti-constitutional statements or attitudes of their colleagues. In Essen, the wife of the local police chief was appointed to this position.

In September 2020, investigators found right-wing extremist photographs on the private mobile phone of a police officer in Essen who had allegedly passed on official secrets to a journalist. Using the memory data on this one mobile phone, they came across at least five far-right chat groups. The oldest had existed since 2012; the group with the most images was founded in 2015. The chat members distributed 126 image files, including photos of Adolf Hitler and a fictitious depiction of a refugee in a gas chamber.

On 16 September 2020, around 200 police officers then searched 34 police stations and private homes of police officers involved in Duisburg, Essen, Mülheim an der Ruhr, Oberhausen, Moers and Selm. They confiscated 43 telephones and numerous storage media. 29 suspected officers and one female officer were suspended from duty. Disciplinary proceedings were opened against them. Almost all of them belonged to a service group at Mülheim police station, including the group leader. The squad was disbanded. Eleven members are said to have actively posted and sent criminally relevant content in the chat groups. They were investigated for incitement of the people and use of symbols of anti-constitutional organisations. The remaining 18 are said to have received the right-wing extremist messages but not reported them. At least 14 of the officers involved were to be dismissed. Mr Reul explained that he expected further findings and was no longer assuming individual cases. He ordered a special inspection for the particularly affected police headquarters in Essen and appointed Uwe Reichel-Offermann (previously Deputy Head of the State Office for the Protection of the Constitution) as a special commissioner to draw up a situation report on right-wing extremism in the NRW police force and a concept for its early detection. On 24 September 2020, Reul reported to the Interior Committee of the NRW state parliament on 100 suspected cases of right-wing extremism in NRW's police force since 2017. 92 disciplinary proceedings were initiated against police officers, 21 of which were concluded without action, and sanctions were imposed eight times. Of the 71 ongoing proceedings, 31 are directed against members of the recently exposed right-wing extremist chat groups. Following their discovery, 16 further reports of right-wing extremist or racist statements were received from NRW police officers. Another officer from the Essen police headquarters was suspended.

According to the NRW Ministry of the Interior, North Rhine-Westphalian police authorities reported a total of 275 cases of suspected right-wing extremism among their officers between 2017 and the end of September 2021. By October 2021, suspicions had been confirmed in 53 of these cases and not in 84 cases. 138 other cases were still being investigated. The confirmed cases have already been penalised under criminal and disciplinary law. Six trainee inspectors were dismissed by mid-September 2021, two were dismissed and three warned. In many other cases, however, the judiciary categorised the chats in question as private communication, meaning that the perpetrators could at best be punished under disciplinary law, but not for disseminating unconstitutional material. These included saved data with the banned Horst Wessel song, photos of Christmas tree baubles with SS runes and "Sieg Heil" inscriptions, with a swastika made from service ammunition and the photo of an officer in uniform giving the "Hitler salute" while standing on two patrol cars.

==== Saxony ====
In May 2015, leftists found a mobile phone with logs of chats that police officer Fernando V. had had with neo-Nazis. In these chats, he had informed a violent offender with a criminal record about upcoming police operations against other neo-Nazis and exchanged antisemitic conspiracy theories. After it became known, he was transferred to a police academy to train police officers. In September 2015, Pegida founder Lutz Bachmann published police investigation files, including the address of a suspect in a rape case. He claimed that he regularly received internal police information labelled as classified. The data was true, but the source was not found.

In December 2015, a main suspect of the Freital group testified that he had received information from the local riot police. This may have been one of the reasons why the eight perpetrators were able to plan and carry out their terrorist attacks unhindered for six months. Investigations into this were only initiated after a victims' lawyer filed a complaint, but were closed without results until 2017 because the three suspected police officers remained silent and their mobile phones with the alleged chats were not found. It was only after the Federal Public Prosecutor General intervened that the Freital group was arrested in 2016 and later convicted of forming a terrorist organisation. The Dresden public prosecutor's office had persistently refused to bring charges for this offence. Saxony's Deputy Prime Minister Martin Dulig (SPD) therefore suspected at the time that "sympathies for Pegida and the Alternative for Germany (AfD) are greater in Saxony's police force than in the average population" and added: "Our police officers are the representatives of our state. As the employer, we can expect them to have internalised the basic elements of political education."

In January 2016, the NPD in Leipzig used Twitter to disseminate the protocol and photo of a police check on demonstrators against Legida, during which weapons were confiscated. The photo was taken from a police computer. How it reached the NPD remained unclear. In the summer of 2018, Lutz Bachmann and the small right-wing extremist party Pro Chemnitz published the police arrest warrant for an Iraqi who was on the run at the time and was accused of murdering a man from Chemnitz. The Saxon justice official Daniel Zabel revealed himself as the source and claimed that he had wanted to counter media lies by copying and passing on the arrest warrant. He was suspended and then ran for Dresden city council as an AfD member. Another police officer disseminated the arrest warrant on Facebook and was fined for doing so.

On 11 January 2016, the first anniversary of Legida, up to 300 right-wing hooligans and neo-Nazis attacked the Connewitz district in Leipzig, which is inhabited by many left-wingers, armed with iron bars, batons, tear gas and a hand grenade. They destroyed 23 pubs, 19 cars, damaged residential buildings and shops, and threatened and injured many passers-by and onlookers. The attackers came from all over Germany, many were known to the police and belonged to right-wing terrorist groups such as Weisse Wölfe Terrorcrew, Skinheads Sächsische Schweiz, "Kameradschaft Tor Berlin", Gruppe Freital, the NPD and violent hooligan groups such as the Imperium Fight Team (Leipzig), Faust des Ostens (Dresden) and NS-Boys (Chemnitz). They had been preparing the attack on social media for months, naming Connewitz as the target days beforehand and their meeting point on arrival. The State Office for the Protection of the Constitution of Saxony had warned of the attack on 9 January 2016. Nevertheless, Saxony's State Office for the Protection of the Constitution and Ministry of the Interior claimed in the Connewitz trials from August 2018 that they had been unaware of the planning. On the other hand, neo-Nazis travelling to the event had learned from police sources about controls against leftists. Antifa research revealed that Saxon police officers were acting as trainers and recruiters for the Imperium Fight Team. No cars of travelling neo-Nazis had been searched during police checks, although weapons were visible in some of them. After the attack, the police collected all discarded items in a box and thus covered up DNA traces, left balaclavas and weapons lying around, allowed detainees to communicate on their mobile phones for hours and thus made it possible to delete arranged chats. From the second of around 112 Connewitz trials, the Leipzig district court, in agreement with neo-Nazi lawyer Olaf Klemke, only handed down suspended sentences to confessed offenders in order to avoid time-consuming witness interrogations. As a result, even organised neo-Nazis and NPD functionaries with previous convictions were classified as fellow travellers and only punished with fines. The court initially did not prosecute violence against persons at all and only called a victim of violence as a witness after press reports about the defendant's previous convictions. The trial was intended to be shortened by merging charges and dispensing with a full hearing of evidence. Trial observers criticised the cooperation of some right-wing police officers and district judges with neo-Nazis and the exploitation of staff shortages in the Saxon judiciary for the lack of prosecution of organised political crime.

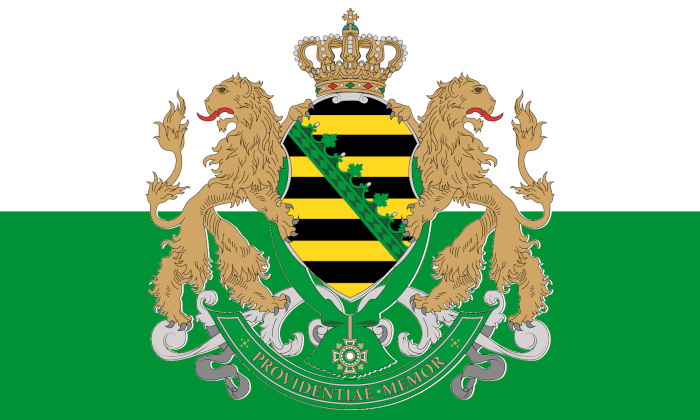
Flag of the Freie Sachsen party, a far-right regionalist and separatist organization operating in Saxony

In 2024, the police conducted an investigated of the neo-Nazi group the Saxon Separatists Sächsische Separatisten. The Federal Criminal Police Office BKA, the Federal Office for the Protection of the Constitution BfV and the Saxony State Criminal Police Office were involved in the investigation. Austrian and Polish secret services were also involved. The Federal Prosecutor's Office finally came to the conclusion that Saxon Separatists made active preparations for a violent coup in Germany. The Federal Prosecutor's Office then found eight men or young people in various places in Saxony in the early morning of November 5, 2024 in Germany and Poland and arrested the suspects. The arrests took place in and around Leipzig, in Dresden, in the Meißen district. The alleged leader Jörg S. was arrested in Zgorzelec, Poland, in the neighboring town of Görlitz. The police searched 20 properties including in Vienna, Austria, and the Krems-Land district. More than 450 emergency services were involved in the operations.

==== Figures and causes ====
According to media reports, right-wing extremist incidents involving the German police have risen sharply in recent years. In response to enquiries from police authorities in all federal states, Deutschlandfunk received information on around 200 such cases across Germany in 2018 and 2019, including racist and inciting statements, contacts or affiliation with the "Reichsbürger", the use of symbols of unconstitutional organisations and others. The enquiries were prompted by the faxes and emails signed "NSU 2.0" containing death threats and private data from Hesse police registers, which a victims' lawyer in the National Socialist Underground trial has been receiving since August 2018. The Frankfurt public prosecutor's office investigated its own colleagues internally for four months before the case became public. As a result of this scandal, dozens of cases were discovered where police officers had made far-right comments in chat groups or at parties, collected Nazi memorabilia, chatted with neo-Nazis or sent swastikas. Hessian Interior Minister Peter Beuth, who had been aware of the suspicions against Frankfurt police officers for months but had concealed them, denied that it was an extreme right-wing network.

According to a survey by Tagesspiegel, 14 state interior ministries registered a total of at least 170 right-wing extremist incidents involving their police officers between the beginning of 2015 and August 2020. These included Hitler salutes, antisemitic videos and Reichsbürger symbols. The state of Hesse did not provide any information on this, Saxony did not register the cases, Berlin did not provide exact figures and some authorities only collected incomplete data. In Bavaria, there were 30 mostly unresolved disciplinary proceedings regarding right-wing extremist incidents, 26 cases in Schleswig-Holstein, 21 in North Rhine-Westphalia, 18 each in Baden-Württemberg and Mecklenburg-Western Pomerania, five in Hamburg, two in Brandenburg, one in Saarland and none in Bremen. Internal police chat groups with right-wing extremist content have so far been reported in Hesse, Berlin, Lower Saxony, Schleswig-Holstein and Baden-Württemberg. None of the 16 authorities registered any left-wing extremist incidents.

Police researchers and criminologists explain the findings by saying that the police profession attracts people with authoritarian and right-wing to far-right attitudes more than many other professions and that the cohesion required for their work in the service groups means that incidents are rarely reported. After the "NSU 2.0" letters became known in December 2018, NSU victim advocate and police trainer Mehmet Daimagüler demanded the following measures from the federal and state governments:

- to screen applicants more closely, not only for previous convictions, but also for possible contacts with right-wing extremists being monitored by the Office for the Protection of the Constitution;
- increase the proportion of women in the police force in order to reduce excessive police violence;
- regularly teach human rights training during training and on duty;
- to continue to regularly monitor the trained officers in personal interviews and through enquiries with the Office for the Protection of the Constitution;
- withdraw their access to sensitive data if they are observed to be close to anti-democratic groups;
- to discipline officers who have attracted the attention of right-wing extremists more consistently and quickly.

Jörn Badendick, a staff representative in the Berlin police force, added: "Every police officer has to stand up in such cases and say: I'm not going along with this."

Offices for internal investigations should no longer be under the control of the police themselves, but should report directly to the public prosecutor's offices.

Representatives of the Green Party called for the appointment of independent police commissioners at federal and state level, modelled on the military commissioner, who could also accept and investigate anonymous reports of shortcomings and misconduct by police officers.

Political scientist Christoph Kopke and criminologist Tobias Singelnstein blame the following factors for the increase in right-wing extremist incidents in the German police force:

- The development in the police force reflects the development of society towards the right "like in a burning glass", whereby regional differences are to be expected.
- In Saxony, the CDU-led state government had claimed for decades that there was no problem with right-wing extremism in the state, thereby influencing the administration and police.
- Nationwide, no research commissions were awarded on changing attitudes among German police officers or on institutional racism. The authorities were mostly dismissive of critical enquiries.
- Applicants with a migration background are too rarely trained and employed by the police.
- The established parties had allowed themselves to be influenced by the AfD's propaganda against refugees in election campaigns and in their deportation policy, so that analogue attitude patterns were increasingly found in the police force. Officers have been given more room for manoeuvre, including for deporting well-integrated foreign families, and are increasingly exploiting this.
- The problem of racial profiling during entry checks without suspicion is not yet sufficiently addressed in police training.
- Despite clearly distancing themselves from right-wing extremism, police leaders and supervisory bodies still do not recognise the problem of structural and institutional racism, but instead usually misinterpret it as an accusation of guilt against all officers and reject it.

In March 2020, the European Commission against Racism and Intolerance (ECRI) presented a new study on institutional racism in Germany. The authors found a significant increase in racism, Islamophobia, unresolved far-right attacks and the trivialisation of the AfD by the authorities between 2014 and June 2019. They called for Germany to include mandatory courses on racism and discrimination, human rights and equal treatment in education laws and curricula in schools, universities and especially in police training. Police racial profiling has been sufficiently proven, but continues to be denied, ignored or dismissed as isolated cases by German police authorities. Victims of discriminatory and racist violence therefore largely lack trust in the German police. The police and the Office for the Defence of the Constitution must specifically campaign for people to leave extreme circles. The Federal Anti-Discrimination Agency must be given more funding and the right to support victims and bring legal action.

Political scientist Hajo Funke sees the right-wing extremist incidents in German police authorities as a "structural problem" of right-wing networks in state institutions. The security authorities "systematically allow such tendencies to spread". The "respective leadership", independent investigations, a functioning judiciary and public pressure are crucial for successful clarification. There is a "lack of political will to investigate" in the Hessian authorities "at all levels, from the police chief to the Minister of the Interior to the Minister President". This is why the author or authors of the "NSU 2.0" threatening emails have still not been caught after more than two years.

Criminologist Dirk Baier explained that chat groups, as typical echo chambers, also cause radicalisation in other ways: "People send each other messages that reinforce their own views. Deviating information is no longer taken note of." Sebastian Fiedler (Association of German Criminal Investigators) called for police officers to be banned from setting up chat groups for official matters on private phones in future. For too long, he said, most federal states had done nothing to tackle this long-known problem. Tobias Singelnstein called for anonymous reporting procedures for internal grievances in the police force, because 'blackening the colours' of colleagues through official channels is generally rejected there.

=== German Armed Forces ===
The Military Counterintelligence Service (MAD) is responsible for registering right-wing extremist incidents in the German Armed Forces (Bundeswehr). The annual reports of the Parliamentary Commissioner for the Armed Forces document them for parliament and the public. The report for 2018 cited 270 new cases of suspected right-wing extremism and 170 reportable incidents. The MAD's criteria only categorise soldiers as extremists if they clearly wanted to eliminate the FDGO. Hitler salutes and Wehrmacht memorabilia are not included; cases reported at unit level are also not statistically recorded. Bundeswehr instructors who report such incidents therefore assume that the number of unreported incidents is up to ten times higher. The official figures are far too low, also because many soldiers are bullied in the troops and forcibly transferred if they report their comrades. The Ministry of Defence often only reacts to media reports on right-wing extremist incidents in the Bundeswehr. Some notable examples in recent years include

- The training books in the army Einsatznah ausbilden and Üben und Schießen contained numerous soldier stories of the alleged heroic spirit of the Wehrmacht, drawing on their guidelines and sources from the Nazi era. They were only revised in 2009 following media reports.
- The soldier motto "Treue um Treue", which translates to "Loyalty for loyalty" was banned in the Bundeswehr in 2014. However, the slogan appeared repeatedly during the Bundeswehr's deployment in Afghanistan. Paratroopers created the Facebook page "Fallschirmjäger – Grüne Teufel!" (Paratroopers – Green Devils!) and thus followed in the tradition of the Wehrmacht paratroopers known as the Green Devils, who had committed many massacres of civilians.
- For decades, soldiers also laid wreaths for Wehrmacht divisions such as the Feldherrnhalle Armoured Corps and the Großdeutschland Panzergrenadier Division at the annual Remembrance Day ceremony in the Panzer Troops' Grove of Honour in Munster. These had committed numerous war crimes during the Nazi era. Invited veterans of the Wehrmacht also took part in the commemoration. In 2012, a veteran played the Waffen-SS's song of loyalty on the harmonica to young Bundeswehr soldiers. It was only when the ARD magazine Kontraste showed this that the Ministry of Defence had the memorial grove in Munster removed.
- A soldier from an armoured division continued to incite hate against refugees from 2015 and wanted to "put Chancellor Angela Merkel up against the wall" if "the right people" came to power. The case against him was dropped in 2017.
- In 2018, a soldier attended several meetings of the right-wing extremist Knights of the Cross fraternity despite a ban on contact. He received a reprimand.
- During further training, five Bundeswehr instructors made discriminatory comments against fellow soldiers of other origins and religions. They were fined as a disciplinary measure, but were allowed to continue training.
- One soldier is said to have remarked in front of a discotheque when seeing dark-skinned people in the presence of other soldiers that "the blacks should have been shot". He was consequently lectured and retained his access to weapons.
- A first sergeant rejected a comrade because he was "not of the same race" and "the races should not mix". He described a training course provided by the Military Counterintelligence service (MAD) on right-wing extremism as lying propaganda. He was not dismissed.
- For decades, Air Force Squadron 74 at Neuburg Air Base glorified Wehrmacht Colonel Werner Mölders, who had been involved in the mass extermination of civilians in the Condor Legion since 1936. His name was on aeroplanes and air force uniforms. A tradition room in the barracks displayed his personal paraphernalia, including a Knight's Cross with diamonds, which Adolf Hitler had only awarded to a few Wehrmacht officers. The anniversary of Mölders' death was celebrated annually with a formation of honour and eulogies at his grave. It was not until 2005 that the then Defence Minister Peter Struck had the barracks renamed. However, Mölders was still stubbornly honoured locally. A Mölders association with the magazine Der Mölderianer and a Mölders memorial stone continued to commemorate the Luftwaffe pilot until 2018. Then defence Minister Ursula von der Leyen only intervened after renewed reports about this.
- Following her order in 2017 to ban Wehrmacht memorabilia from barracks and rename barracks named after Wehrmacht soldiers, most town councillors and soldiers in Rotenburg (Wümme) voted in favour of retaining the namesake of the Lent barracks, Helmut Lent. They regarded the Nazi perpetrator as a war hero and patriot who carried out his orders, just "on the wrong side".
- Members of the Special Forces Command (KSK) allegedly played right-wing extremist music and gave the Hitler salute at the farewell ceremony for a company commander in 2017. Antisemitic and xenophobic statements were repeatedly reported in the KSK. However, the MAD military intelligence agency did not investigate these suspected cases.
- At the Special Operations Training Centre in Pullendorf, there were repeated instances of degrading admission rituals. When these became known, KSK soldiers reported numerous antisemitic and racist statements by their comrades in an anonymous letter. One of them had sent a photomontage by email showing the entrance gate of the Auschwitz concentration camp through which refugees were streaming. Above it was the sentence: "There is room for every one of you here." The company commander knew about this but did nothing about it. It is common in the KSK for such service offences to be covered up. They wrote anonymously because otherwise they were threatened with harassment and the perpetrators would get away unpunished.
- Non-commissioned officer Patrick J. frequently reported right-wing extremist comments made by KSK soldiers on social media, even outside of the troop. One of them constantly spoke of a "Jewish gene" and repeatedly insulted fellow soldiers as "Jews". The MAD ensured that the Bundeswehr Personnel Office dismissed the reporter because he lacked "character suitability": From 2017 onwards, he had pretended with many reports "to want to point out possible right-wing extremist tendencies and undemocratic behaviour in the entire armed forces".

== Legal issues ==
Some German neo-Nazis use early symbols of the Reichskriegsflagge predating the introduction of the Nazi swastika, which therefore are legal in Germany.

The German Criminal Code forbids the "use of symbols of unconstitutional organizations" outside the contexts of "art or science, research or teaching". However, Nazi paraphernalia has been smuggled into the country for decades. Neo-Nazi rock bands such as Landser have been outlawed in Germany, yet bootleg copies of their albums printed in the United States and other countries are still sold in the country. German neo-Nazi websites mostly depend on Internet servers in the US and Canada. They often use symbols that are reminiscent of the swastika, and adopt other symbols used by the Nazis, such as the Black Sun, Algiz rune, and Iron Cross alongside the flag of the German Empire.

Neo-Nazi groups active in Germany which have attracted government attention include Volkssozialistische Bewegung Deutschlands/Partei der Arbeit banned in 1982, Action Front of National Socialists/National Activists banned in 1983, the Nationalist Front banned in 1992, the Free German Workers' Party, the German Alternative and National Offensive. German Interior Minister Wolfgang Schäuble condemned the Homeland-Faithful German Youth, accusing it of teaching children that anti-immigrant racism and anti-Semitism are acceptable. Homeland-Faithful German Youth claimed that it was centred primarily on "environment, community and homeland", but it has been argued to have links to the National Democratic Party (NPD).

Historian Walter Laqueur wrote in 1996 that the far right NPD cannot be classified as neo-Nazi. In the 2004 Saxony state election, the NPD received 9.1% of the vote, thus earning the right to seat state parliament members. The other parties refused to enter discussions with the NPD. In the 2006 parliamentary elections for Mecklenburg-Western Pomerania, the NPD received 7.3% of the vote and six seats in the state parliament. On 13 March 2008, NPD leader Udo Voigt was charged with Volksverhetzung ("incitement to hatred", a crime under the German criminal law), for distributing racially charged pamphlets referring to German footballer Patrick Owomoyela, whose father is Nigerian. In 2009, Voigt was given a seven-month suspended sentence and ordered to donate 2,000 euros to UNICEF.

== Criminal and violent offences ==
=== Recording and Methodology ===
Since 2001, the German law enforcement agencies' (e.g. BKA, police and BfV) definition system for politically motivated crime (PMK) has included hate crimes motivated by group hatred in addition to traditional state security offences. This includes offences that are "directed against a person because of their political views, nationality, ethnicity, race, skin colour, religion, ideology, origin, or because of their external appearance, disability, sexual orientation or social status", as well as offences that are directed against an institution or object for precisely these reasons. The Federal Criminal Police Office classifies offences as politically right-wing motivated "if references to ethnic nationalism, racism, social Darwinism or National Socialism were wholly or partially the cause of the offence". The "right-wing extremism potential" is defined by research as people with a "coherent right-wing extremist world view". The methods and criteria used to determine this are controversial.

Since March 2008, the crime statistics have also included unsolved or unsolvable propaganda offences as politically motivated crimes. For a long time, however, the state criminal investigation offices hardly ever investigated possible right-wing extremist motives in the case of non-organised individual perpetrators. A review of murder motives before 2015 resulted in considerable upward corrections to the state victim statistics, but was carried out without a standardised methodology. Victims' associations and experts continue to assume that the number of unreported offences is high.

=== General statistics ===
List of state registered right-wing extremists:

Year	1999	2000	2001	2002	2003	2004	2005	2006	2007	2008	2009
Total	51.400	50.900	49.700	45.000	41.500	40.700	39.000	38.600	31.000	30.000	26.600
Violent	9000	9.700	10.400	10.700	10.000	10.000	10.400	10.400	10.000	9.500	9000

Year	2010	2011	2012	2013	2014	2015	2016	2017	2018	2019	2020
Total	25.000	22.400	22.150	21.700	21.000	22.600	23.100	24.000	24.100	32.080	33.300
Violent	9.500	9.800	9.600	9.600	10.500	11.800	12.100	12.700	12.700	13.000	13.300

Year	2021	2022
Total	33.900	38.800
Violent	13.500	14.000

State-registered right-wing extremist offences since 1990:

Year	1990	1991	1992	1993	1994	1995	1996	1997	1998	1999
Total offenses		3.884	7.383	10.561	7.952	7.896	8.730	11.719	11.049	10.037
Violent offenses	309	1492	2639	2232	1489	837	624	790	708	746

Year	2000	2001	2002	2003	2004	2005	2006	2007	2008	2009
Total offenses	15.951	14.725	12.933	11.576	12.051	15.361	18.142	17.607	20.422	19.468
Violent offenses	998	980	1.930	1.870	832	1.034	1047	980	1042	891

Year	2010	2011	2012	2013	2014	2015	2016	2017	2018	2019
Total offenses	15.905	16.142	17.616	16.557	16.559	21.933	22.471	19.467	19.409	21.290
Violent offenses	762	755	802	801	990	1408	1600	1054	1088	925

Year	2020	2021	2022
Total offenses	22.357	20.201	20.967
Violent offenses	1023	945	1.016

== Election results ==
Year	Candidate(s)	Votes	%	Rank
1949	German Right Party (DRP)	429,031	1.81	9th
Total		429,031▲	1.81	Lost
1953	Deutsche Reichspartei (DRP)	295,739	1.07	9th
1953	Dachverband der Nationalen Sammlung	70,726	0.26	11th
Total		366,465▼	1.33	Lost
1957	Deutsche Reichspartei (DRP)	308,564	1.03	6th
1957	German Community (DG)	17,490	0.06	11th
1957	Patriotic Union (VU)	5,020	0.02	12th
Total		331,074▼	1.11	Lost
1961	Deutsche Reichspartei (DRP)	262,977	0.83	6th
1961	German Community (DG)	27,308	0.09	7th
Total		290,285▼	0.92	Lost
1965	National Democratic Party of Germany (NPD)	664,193	2.04	4th
Total		664,193▲	2.04	Lost
1969	National Democratic Party of Germany (NPD)	1,422,010	4.31	4th
1969	Independent Workers' Party (UAP)	5,309	0.09	11th
Total		1,427,319▲	4.40	Lost
1972	National Democratic Party of Germany (NPD)	207,465	0.55	4th
Total		207,465▼	0.55	Lost
1976	National Democratic Party of Germany (NPD)	122,661	0.32	4th
1976	European Workers' Party (EAP)	6,811	0.02	9th
1976	Christian Bavarian People's Party (CBV)	6,720	0.02	10th
1976	5%-Block	2,940	0.01	13th
1976	Independent Workers' Party (UAP)	765	0.00	14th
Total		139,897▼	0.37	Lost
1980	National Democratic Party of Germany (NPD)	68,096	0.18	6th
1980	European Workers' Party (EAP)	7,666	0.02	10th
1980	Christian Bavarian People's Party (CBV)	3,946	0.01	11th
Total		79.708▼	0.21	Lost
1983	National Democratic Party of Germany (NPD)	91,095	0.23	5th
1983	European Workers' Party (EAP)	14,966	0.04	7th
1983	Christian Bavarian People's Party (CBV)	10,994	0.03	9th
Total		117.055▲	0.30	Lost
1987	National Democratic Party of Germany (NPD)	227,054	0.60	5th
1987	Responsible Citizens	24,630	0.07	9th
1987	Christian Bavarian People's Party (CBV)	5,282	0.01	13th
Total		227,054▲	0.68	Lost
1990	The Republicans (REP)	987,269	2.13	6th
1990	National Democratic Party of Germany (NPD)	145,776	0.31	10th
1990	Responsible Citizens	492	0.00	23rd
Total		1,133,537▲	2.44	Lost
1994	The Republicans (REP)	875,239	1.86	6th
Total		875,239▼	1.86	Lost
1998	The Republicans (REP)	906,383	1.84	6th
1998	German People's Union	601,192	1.22	7th
1998	National Democratic Party of Germany (NPD)	126,571	0.26	11th
Total		1,634,146▲	3.32	Lost
2002	The Republicans (REP)	280,671	0.58	7th
2002	National Democratic Party of Germany (NPD)	215,232	0.45	8th
Total		495,903▼	1.03	Lost
2005	National Democratic Party of Germany (NPD)	748,568	1.58	6th
2005	The Republicans (REP)	266,101	0.56	7th
Total		1,014,669▲	2.14	Lost
2009	National Democratic Party of Germany (NPD)	635,525	1.47	7th
2009	The Republicans (REP)	193,396	0.45	9th
2009	German People's Union	45,752	0.11	15th
Total		874,673▼	2.03	Lost
2013	Alternative for Germany (AfD)	2,056,985	4.70	6th
2013	National Democratic Party of Germany (NPD)	560,828	1.28	8th
2013	The Republicans (REP)	91,193	0.21	12th
2013	Pro Germany Citizens' Movement	73,854	0.17	14th
2013	The Right	2,245	0.01	29th
Total		2,785,105▲	6.37	Lost
2017	Alternative for Germany (AfD)	5,878,115	12.64	3rd
2017	National Democratic Party of Germany (NPD)	176,020	0.38	10th
2017	The Right	2,054	0.00	30th
Total		6,056,189▲	13.02	Lost
2021	Alternative for Germany (AfD)	4,809,228	10.39	5th
2021	National Democratic Party of Germany (NPD)	64,360	0.14	15th
2021	Third Way	7,832	0.02	31st
Total		4,881,420▼	10.57	Lost
2025	Alternative for Germany (AfD)	10,327,148	20.80	2nd
Total		10,327,148▲	20.80	Lost

== See also ==
- Antisemitenparteien
- Firewall against the far-right in Germany
- Antisemitism in 21st-century Germany
- Neo-Nazism
- Neo-Nazism in Germany
- Radical right
- Reichsbürger movement
- Right-wing terrorism in Germany
- Strafgesetzbuch § 86a
- Terrorism in Germany
