= Neo-Nazi marches in Dresden =

Marches by Nazi groups in post-war Germany

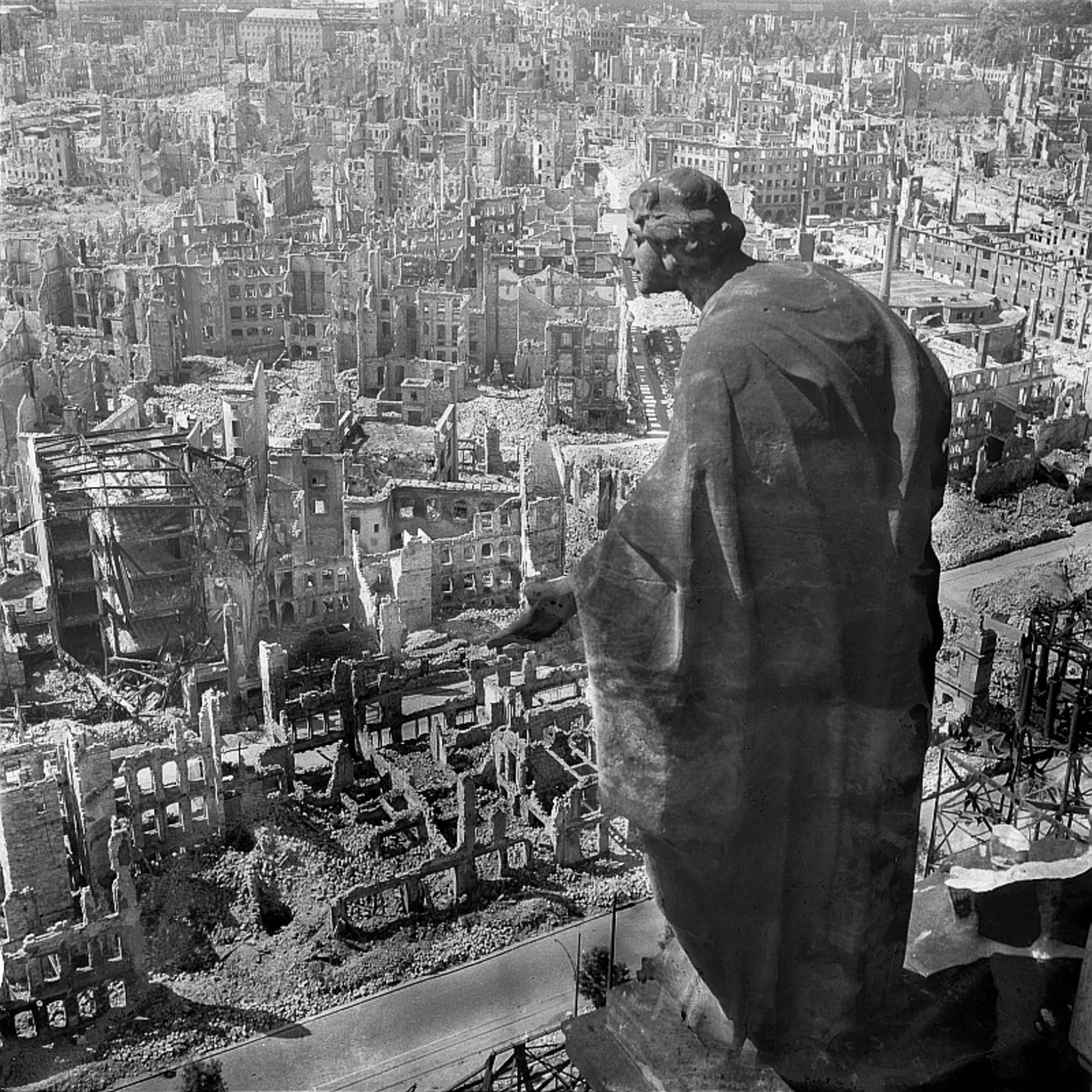
Dresden after the bombing in 1945

During the early 21st century, Dresden was the site of some of the largest gatherings of neo-Nazis in post-war Germany. The annual right-wing marches (held at the beginning of February) peaked in 2007 and 2009, with about 6,500 participants. At the marches, a broad coalition of right-wing groups (including Nazis) commemorated the Allied bombing of Dresden at the end of World War II on the weekend after the anniversary of the bombing on February 13, 1945.

In contrast to reactions in other German cities, resistance against the marches from civil society and left-wing groups had been relatively weak. With the emergence of Dresden Nazifrei (Dresden without Nazis), however, Nazi marchers were blocked from marching for the first time in 2010 by thousands of demonstrators; blockades were also mounted in 2011. Nazi marches were prevented entirely in 2012.

== Political context ==
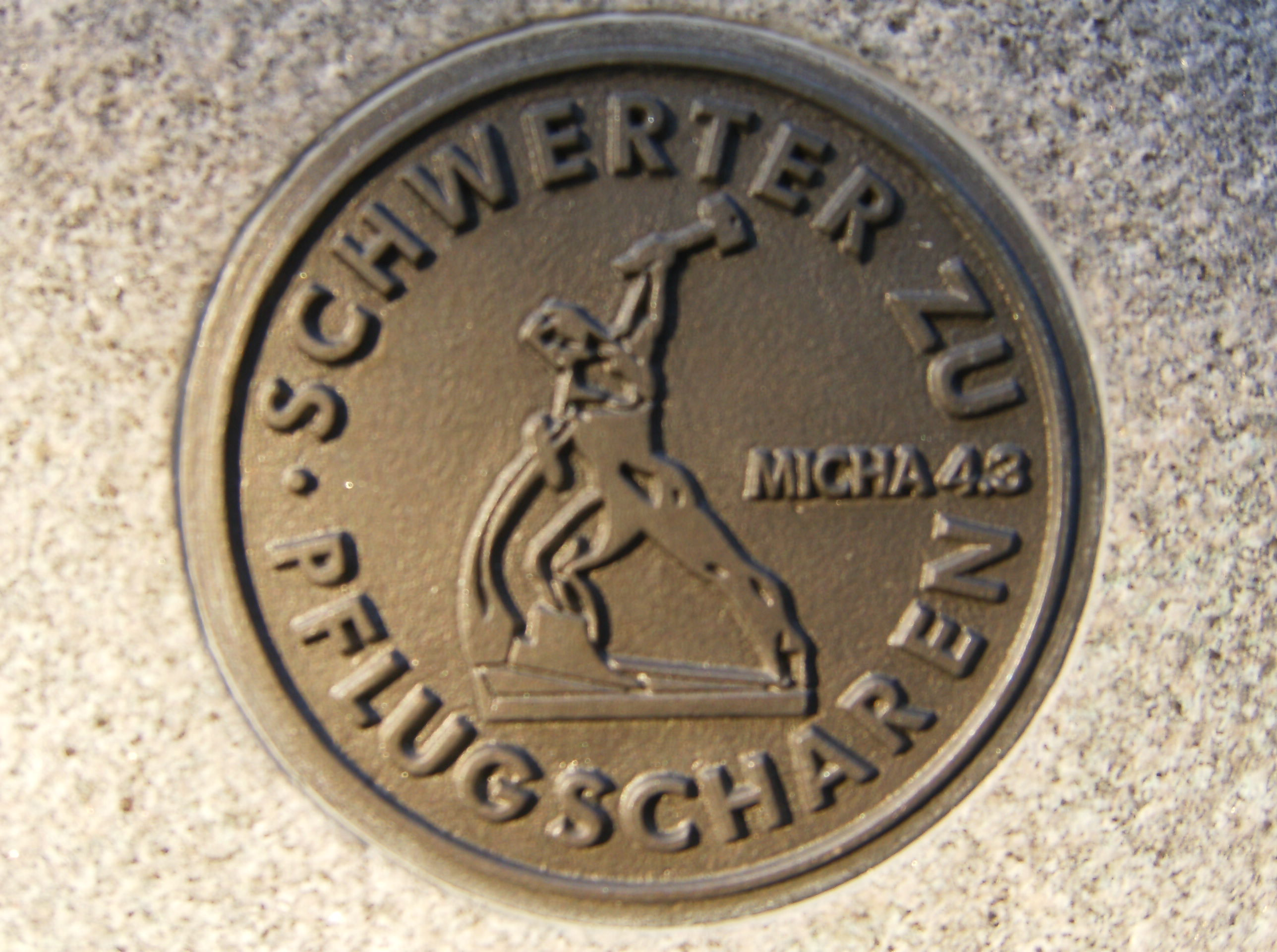
"Swords into plowshares" symbol of the GDR peace movement, 1981

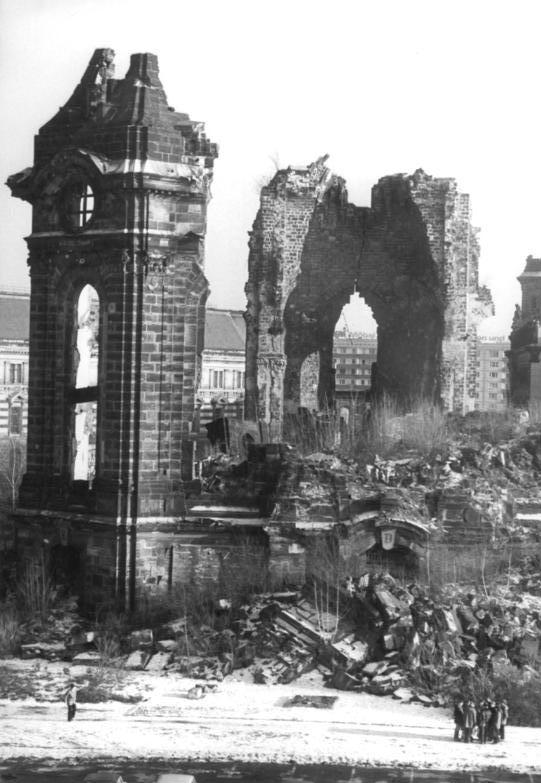
Ruins of the Frauenkirche in February 1985

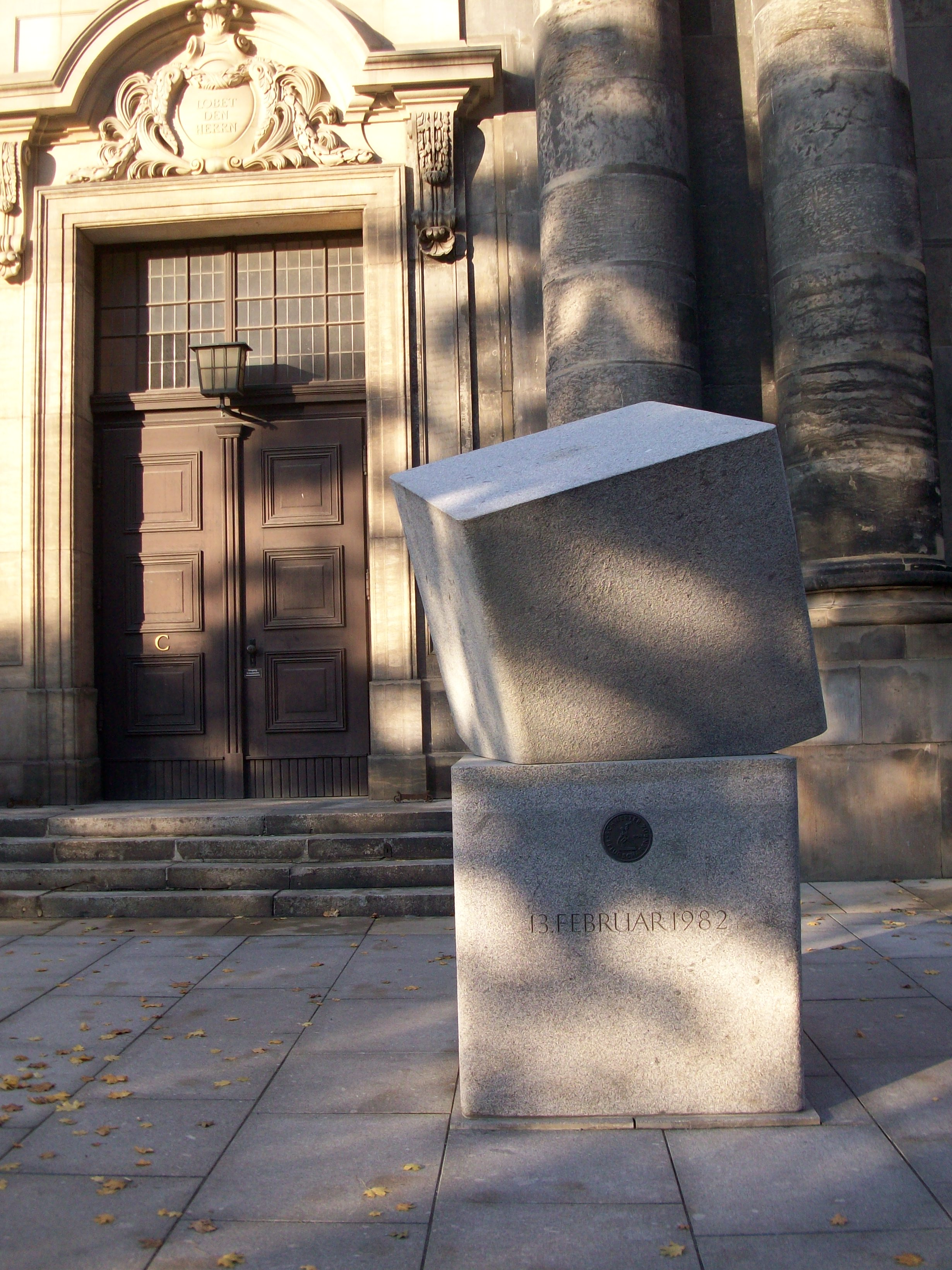
Memorial for the Peace Forum, Kreuzkirche, 2010

As part of East Germany, Dresden was in the "valley of the clueless" (Tal der Ahnungslosen) because its citizens were beyond the reach of West German television broadcasts (which citizens elsewhere in East Germany could watch illegally). After German reunification, Dresden continued to be different; while most states in eastern Germany have been governed by coalitions (often involving the former SED, renamed the Party of Democratic Socialism, Saxony was governed by the conservative Christian Democratic Union (CDU).

== Commemorating the bombing ==
The 13 February 1945 bombing of Dresden, which killed up to 25,000 people, has been commemorated. The trauma of the bombing led to a culture of remembrance, with annual events. These events had taken place in Dresden since 1946, earlier than in other German cities. Although their focus has changed several times, the bells of all Dresden churches have been rung on 13 February at 9:50 p.m. since 1946.

=== Nazi Germany ===
Immediately after the bombing, it was used for propaganda purposes by the Reich Ministry of Public Enlightenment and Propaganda and Joseph Goebbels.

=== East Germany (1949–1989) ===
Commemorations were then largely taken over by the churches, and the bells of all Dresden churches have been rung on 13 February at 9:50 p.m. Since 1955, the bombing had been used as German Democratic Republic propaganda. John H. Noble, former co-owner of the Kamera-Werkstätten and a survivor of the Soviet gulag, was released in 1955. Noble then wrote books about his prison experiences in Siberia. To damage Noble's reputation, former Saxon Prime Minister Max Seydewitz invented a "Noble legend" that Noble had directed the Allied air fleets with a transmitter in his Villa San Remo in Dresden.

==== Opposition after 1981 ====
State commemoration of the bombing was criticized by the opposition, civil rights and peace movements, and churches, because it did not acknowledge German responsibility for the war. In 1981, young people from the church peace movement began commemorations which were independent of the state. They began distributing illegal "Aufruf zum 13. Februar 1982" leaflets in September of that year, and wanted to hold a symbolic candlelight vigil in front of the ruined Frauenkirche to protest against a perceived increase in militarization. Their efforts were suppressed by the Stasi, and the Evangelical-Lutheran Church of Saxony offered to organize a peace forum at the Kreuzkirche as a compromise. The 13 February 1982 Peace Forum, with about 5,000 participants, became a highlight of the Swords to Plowshares peace movement; the forum, in turn, was a precursor of the Peaceful Revolution.

Steine des Anstoßes (Stones of Incentive), in front of the Kreuzkirche's southern portal, was built in 2010 to commemorate the 1982 Peace Forum. Since the Peaceful Revolution in 1989, Dresden city representatives have dealt more directly with the city's war past.

=== Reunified Germany (1991 – present) ===
Every year until 2015, a ceremony commemorating the air raids on Dresden was held on the morning of 13 February at the Heidefriedhof cemetery, where most of the bombing victims are buried. Although most right-wing extremists and neo-Nazis had long been prohibited from participating in the wreath-laying ceremonies at the cemetery, the far-right National Democratic Party of Germany was allowed to participate from 2005 to 2014 as part of the Saxon State Parliament.

== Neo-Nazi demonstrations (1999–2009) ==
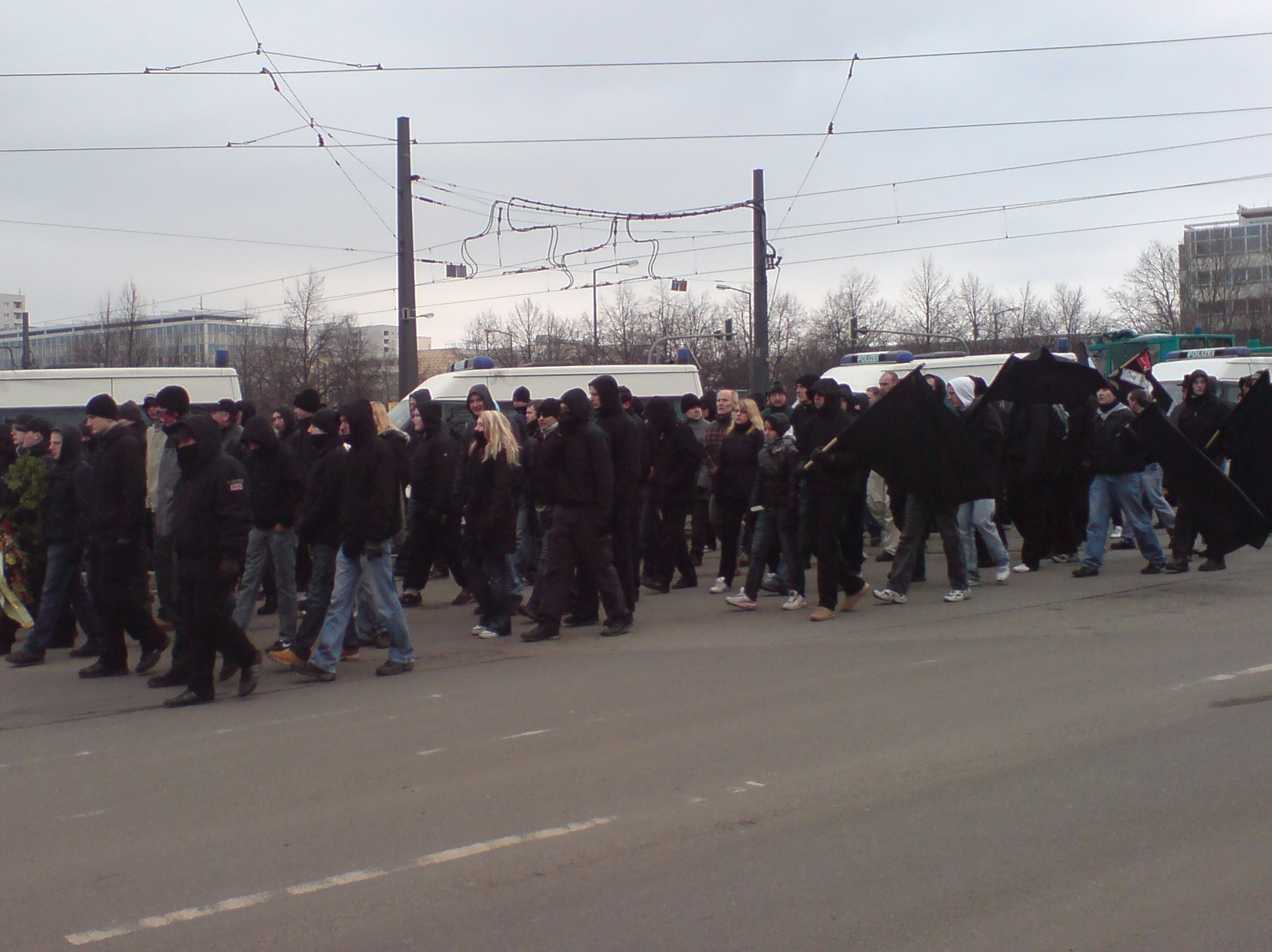
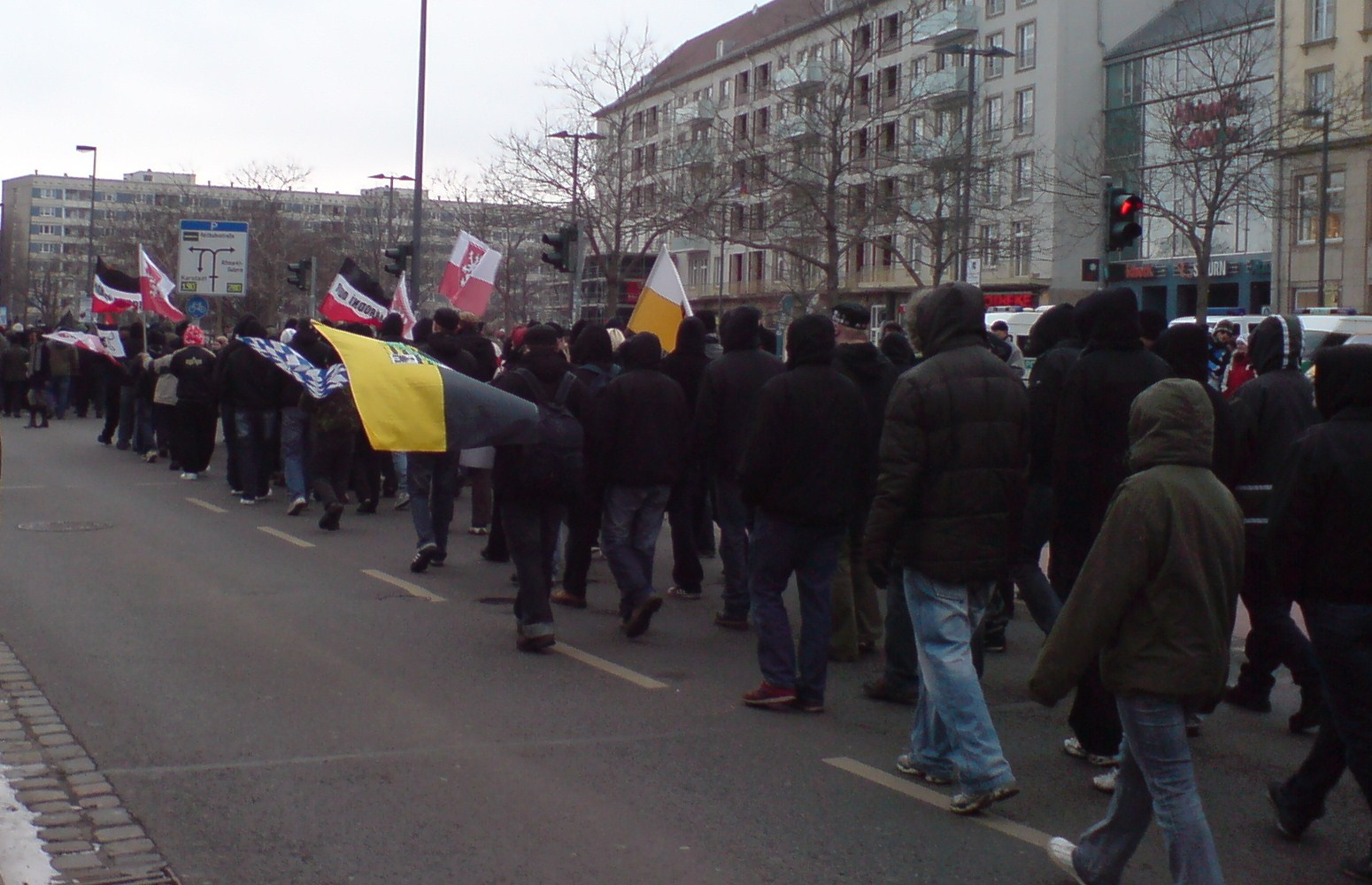
Far-right NPD and JLO marchers in 2009

On 13 February 1990, British Holocaust denier David Irving delivered a lecture to an audience of about 500 in Dresden. His description of the air strikes as Allied genocide encouraged neo-Nazism in the GDR. After German reunification, particularly after 1991, increasing numbers of right-wing extremists used the annual commemoration for propaganda. During the mid-1990s, small groups of neo-Nazis began to mingle among others commemorating the bombing at the Frauenkirche.

In 1999, about 150 neo-Nazis held their first gathering to commemorate the bombing. The following year, the Junge Landsmannschaft Ostdeutschland (JLO) organized its first night "funeral march". For the next few years, the JLO organized a "mourning march" with the neo-Nazi National Democratic Party of Germany (NPD) and the Freie Kräfte (Free Forces, neo-Nazi activists who are not party members). From 2001 to 2004, participation in the event increased from 750 to about 2,100 people. 2005. About 6,500 right-wing extremists demonstrated in 2005, falling to about 1,500 in 2007. Freie Kräfte members called the commemoration ritualized and hollow that year, and they organized their own regional demonstration in Dresden. It had grown to a "week of action" by 2010, during which Nazis handed out leaflets and engaged in agitprop. A small demonstration was held by the Freie Kräfte in 2012, followed by a larger JLO march.

From 2000 to 2009, the "mourning march" was Europe's largest Nazi demonstration; Participation peaked at nearly 7,000 by 2009, with delegations from far-right groups and parties throughout Europe. One factor in the attendance growth was the disruption (or banning) of neo-Nazi demonstrations in Halbe and Wunsiedel. The annual Dresden marches had become a significant aspect of German neo-Nazism.

== Anti-fascist protests and political apathy ==
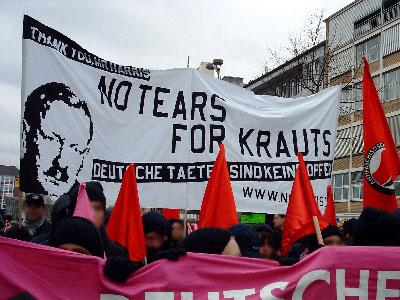
Anti-German banner in 2005

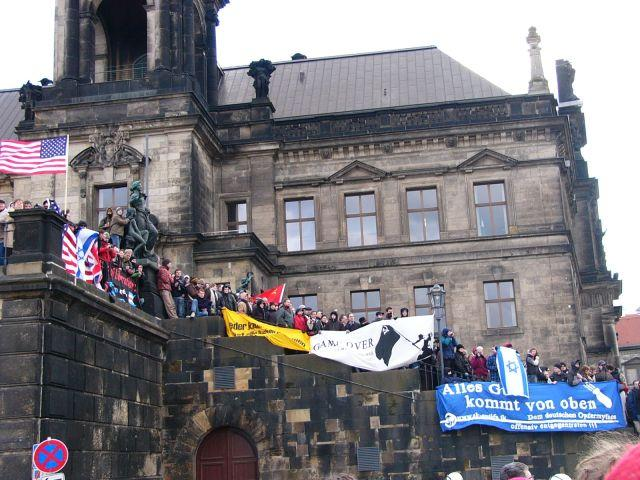
Anti-fascist protesters in 2005; the blue banner reads, "All good things come from above".

Anti-German initiatives such as Antifa enjoyed little popular support; their focus on attacking Nazis conveyed little understanding of the civilian air-raid victims, and they were perceived as disrupting the official commemoration. Their most notable act was a 2006 blockade by several hundred demonstrators of the Carola Bridge, forcing the Nazi march to change its route. The left-wing protests were not endorsed by the Christian Democrats, Dresden and Saxony's dominant political party at the time, who seemed to tolerate the growth of right-wing extremism. They tended to ignore the Nazis, opting for a silent commemoration of the bombing victims.

When the Free Democratic Party's Ingolf Roßberg became Lord Mayor of Dresden in 2001, he invited clubs and associations to take coordinated action against right-wing extremist public events and expressed support for the White Rose. Roßberg appointed a commission of historians to determine the actual number of victims of the Dresden air raids, and encouraged civic engagement through official action. According to the CDU's Kurt Biedenkopf, however, the Saxons were immune to right-wing extremism; Biedenkopf's statement to the Saxon State Parliament encouraged right-wing extremist tendencies and blocked civic engagement against neo-Nazis. The commemoration ceremony continued to include members and supporters of the neo-Nazi NPD.

== 2009 counter-protest ==
In 2008, national anti-fascist groups and left-of-center parties concluded that the annual Nazi march in Dresden was no longer a regional issue; it had become the largest gathering of Nazis in Germany. The groups organized a national protest against the Dresden march and formed the No Pasaran coalition; "no pasaran" ("They shall not pass") was an anti-fascist slogan which originated during the Spanish Civil War. "This year, we have federated as a preparatory alliance to approach the issues of 13 February in a new way," announced one anti-fascist group in the alliance. The coalition sought to distance itself from the anti-German protesters: "We won't stand for the cheap celebrating of war dead". Instead, it aimed to organize a "big antifa demo organized together with antifascist organizations from all over Germany on 14 February 2009".

Left-of-center parties including the Green Party, the Social Democrats and The Left and their youth organizations, the German Trade Union Confederation (DGB), the Protestant church, the Jewish Congregation of Dresden and several liberal foundations formed the Geh Denken ("Go and Remember") alliance. It sought a "clear stop to right-wing extremism" in a "peaceful and non-violent way". The alliance collected 200 initial signatories for its call to action, and 10,000 people signed the call during the campaign.

On 14 February, No Pasaran organized a demonstration of between 2,500 (according to the police) and 4,000 peaceful antifascists (according to the organizers) from across Germany in Dresden's inner city. The demonstration was closely monitored and accompanied by the police. At the end of its route, the demonstration unsuccessfully tried to break through police lines to join the Geh Denken demonstrations. With batons and pepper spray, police kept the antifascists and Nazis apart after the demonstration.

Not far away, 12,000 people gathered when three demonstrations organized by Geh Denken joined at the Schloßplatz for speeches and performances. Among the protesters were Social Democratic chair Franz Münthefering, Greens chair Claudia Roth, The Left chair Gregor Gysi, and German Association of Unions head Michael Sommer. During a major election year, politicians wanted to demonstrate their opposition to neo-Nazism.

Evaluating the day, a No Pasaran group mentioned a "moldy aftertaste" despite a "successful mobilization". Geh Denken called the experience "simultaneously successful and bitter", and the police "suppressed protests along the Nazi route". Both alliances acknowledged that they had not stopped the Nazi march, and Geh Denken dissolved.

At the end of the day, a group of 40 neo-Nazis attacked anti-fascist demonstrators traveling home from the counter-demonstration at a highway rest stop. One protester, a 42-year-old union member, sustained a fractured skull after he was repeatedly kicked by the neo-Nazis. Geh Denken reported "at least" four assaults by neo-Nazis that day on counter-demonstrators.

== Dresden Nazifrei (2009–2012) ==
The failed intervention against the Nazi march in February 2009 set the stage for the Dresden Nazifrei alliance in early December of that year, which was announced at an "action conference" organized by No Pasaran. The conference made a public call to block the next Nazi march: "We will use the tactic of mass blockades in which everybody can participate to prevent the Nazi march", and called for the creation of a "framework to plan and coordinate the necessary actions". The alliance of over 50 groups included the No Pasaran alliance, local citizens' groups, liberal parties such as The Left, the Greens and factions of the Social Democrats, unions and youth organizations. In a press release, Dresden Nazifrei said: "Our blockades are a form of action in which people experienced and those inexperienced in protest, young and old people, can participate simultaneously". During protests on 19 February 2011, a group of 200 neo-Nazis attacked an alternative housing project while police stood by.

== First blockade (2010) ==
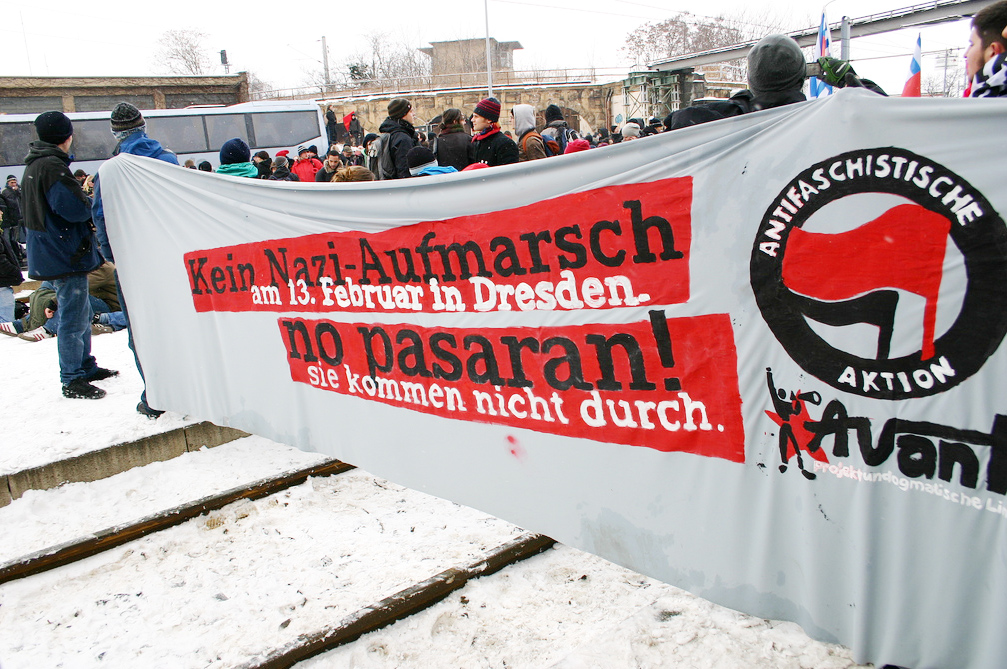
Protesters blocking the 2010 Nazi march, with banners reading "No Nazi march on February 13th" and "They shall not pass"

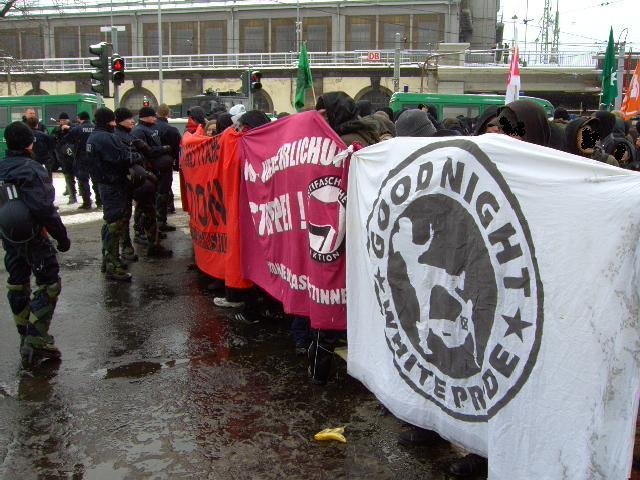
2010 Antifa blockade

During the weeks before the march, police searched the offices of Dresden Nazifrei groups in search of posters. Police shut down the German Dresden Nazifrei homepage (which moved to a .com address), and ordered private travel companies to cancel buses for demonstrators. The moves by Saxon authorities backfired; over 2,000 people and more than 600 groups signed the call by Dresden Nazifrei to block the march.

The 65th anniversary of the bombings was in 2010 and, given the 2009 conflicts, city authorities were under pressure to react to the threat of another large Nazi demonstration. The Dresden government set up the Arbeitsgruppe 13. Februar (13 February Working Group), which included major parties, congregations and civil-society organizations. The group encouraged Dresden residents to form a human chain around the city center which would, according to Mayor Helma Orosz, "remember in depth and forcefully the horrible events in 1945 and to protect the city against violence and extremism".

Meanwhile, Dresden Nazifrei mobilized its followers for the announced mass blockades. On the early morning of 13 February, over 100 buses from more than 50 cities in Germany, Austria and Switzerland arrived in several large convoys; over 30 buses traveled together in a convoy from Berlin. The buses brought demonstrators as close as possible to the neo-Nazi gathering points. After getting off the buses, the demonstrators formed groups which split into smaller groups to avoid police lines on their way to pre-arranged blockade points. About 12,000 peaceful protesters blocked the streets around the Nazi gathering point at Neustadt train station with four large blockades and several smaller ones.

Although the police soon abandoned their efforts to evict the larger blockades, some smaller blockades were dispersed with batons and pepper spray. During the day, several confrontations between autonomous anti-fascists and some of the city's 5,700 police officers occurred.

Near the blockades, groups of anti-fascists confronted small groups of Nazis trying to reach their gathering point. More than 1,000 Nazis marched from the highway through the suburbs and Dresden's Hechtviertel neighborhood, attacking an alternative youth center on their way to the Neustadt gathering point. Although more than 500 Nazis had gathered there to march, police called off the march during the afternoon because they could not guarantee the marchers' safety.

About 15,000 Dresdenites participated in the human chain that was closed around the historic city for several minutes on the other side of the river in Dresden's historic center. "The human chain does not go beyond symbolic protest", criticized a spokesperson from Dresden Nazifrei. The alliance highlighted that the human organized by the city took place "far away from the Nazi march" and was "not even at the same time". The mayor of Dresden Helma Orosz, however, claimed later that the human chain had prevented the Nazi march.

At the end of the day, the legal team of Dresden Nazifrei reported 24 persons arrested. The demonstration medical team reported the treatment of 100 people. In the evening, 3,000 people who participated in the blockades celebrated the blockade of the Nazi march with a spontaneous demonstration. Meanwhile, disappointed neo-Nazis traveling home from the prevented demonstration rioted in the nearby towns of Pirna and Gera attacking an office of the Social Democratic Party.

Dresden Nazifrei declared "A great success in the history of antifascist mobilizations" and "a bitter defeat for the Nazis in their 'fight for the street'" in a statement at the end of the day. In the following days and weeks, the German Nazi-scene debated how to cope with blockades in the future. A leading Nazi-activist from Hamburg urged for a change in tactics proposing a concept of organizing several marches, a star march.

== Second blockade (2011) ==
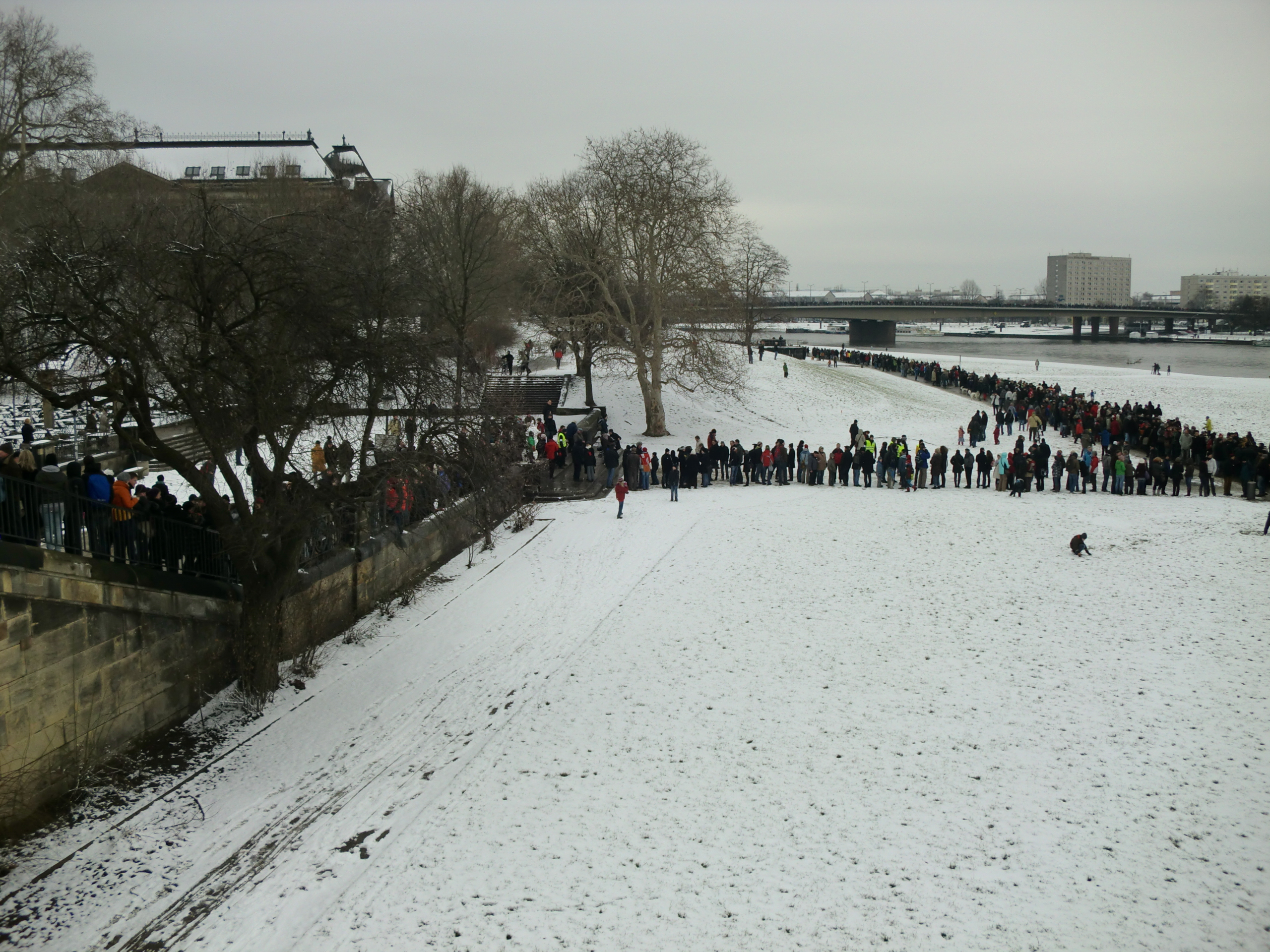
Human chain against the Nazis in 2011

A few weeks before the 2011 march, a local court ruled that police had made insufficient effort the previous year to guarantee the Nazis their constitutional right to assemble and demonstrate. Police announced a strict separation strategy, and Dresden Nazifrei insisted that they would blockade. The alliance mobilized primarily against the large, national Nazi march scheduled for the week after 13 February. Dresden Nazifrei organized a tour on 13 February, guided by historians, of locations of former Dresden Nazi leaders and institutions. The tour was banned by Saxon authorities, and about 500 people protested against the ban. Later that day, 1,300 Saxon Nazis participated in a torchlight march through a Dresden suburb which was organized by the Freie Kräfte and other regional Nazis. About 3,000 people unsuccessfully tried to block the march.

On 19 February, Dresden Nazifrei and No Pasaran increased their mobilization efforts. That morning, more than 260 buses with thousands of protesters from across Germany and neighboring countries drove to Dresden. Stopped by police when they left the highway, they walked several miles to the blockade points announced by Dresden Nazifrei to encircle the Nazis at their gathering point. Several times, large groups of anti-fascists passed through police lines.

Although 4,500 police officers used pepper spray, batons, dogs, pepper-ball guns, helicopters, a drone, and water cannons in zero-degree Celsius in an attempt to enforce the separation of Nazis and anti-fascist protesters, they could not prevent about 20,000 anti-fascists from entering the area where the Nazi march was planned. Around noon, police lost control of the area where anti-fascists had set up peaceful blockades; several riots and street fights erupted between autonomous anti-fascists and police, but "most protests against the Nazis were peaceful". Dresden Nazifrei criticized the police for attacking protesters, regardless of whether or not they were protesting peacefully. "Apparently, the police want to haul the Nazi march through against all odds," said a spokesperson for the alliance at noon. During the afternoon, when it was obvious that the strategy of separation had failed, police cancelled the Nazi march .

The Nazi strategy failed. To counter the announced antifascist blockades, they had announced three marches which would end together. About 2,000 Nazis were in the city that day, fewer than the year before. Due to the blockades, most did not reach their gathering points. Only about 50 made it to one gathering point at Nürnberger Platz, and 400 to 500 assembled near the main train station. A group of about 100 Nazis marched from the Dresden suburbs to the Plauen neighborhood, where they were stopped by police. A large group of Nazis trying to get to their gathering point attacked the Praxis leftist housing project in the Löbtau neighborhood.

At the end of the day, the medical team reported that they treated over 200 people who were injured by pepper spray. More than 150 protesters were injured with fractures, bruises and lacerations. Dresden Nazifrei called it "a successful day with an aftertaste", and concluded that aggressive policing had escalated several situations into riots.

Police reported 82 injuries and the filing of 60 charges against protesters for rioting, assault and property damage, and against over 200 people for violating the law of assembly. They bemoaned a new level of violence, and set up the special Soko 19 February commission to investigate the day's events. "Dresden stands up with force against Nazis", said the German television channel N24; according to an article in the Dresden-based newspaper Morgenpost, "Blockades set Nazis on checkmate".

In its analysis, Dresden Nazifrei concluded: "While in 2010 the forces of order allowed the declaration of a state of emergency because of the protest (cooperating with us), this year we had to fight through the blockade of the Nazi march against the city administration, courts and the police who wanted to let the Nazis march at all costs". According to the Nazi news outlet Mupinfo, "Dresden 2011 has ended in a defeat".

== Nazi march prevented (2012) ==
On Monday, 13 February, between 1,600 and 2,000 Nazis participated in a regional Nazi march. About 6,000 demonstrators participated in protests organized by Dresden Nazifrei, setting up three blockades on the march route. The 5,800 policemen deployed by the city that day engaged in de-escalation, and did not try to break up the blockades. The Nazi route was shortened significantly due to the protests, and was called a "tour around the block". "We ridicule ourselves with this", said one Nazi post. One group of Nazis refused to continue their march after they learned that it had been shortened. The newspaper Die Tageszeitung said, "No violence, no riots, frustrated Nazis, lucky antifascists".

That day, 13,000 people formed a human chain organised by the city. Some people from the chain later joined the blockade, protesting in activities organised by Dresden Nazifrei. According to Dresden mayor Dirk Hilbert (FDP), the human chain was a "clear sign against national socialism, racism and violence". A tour tracing the city's National Socialist past, led by Dresden Nazifrei historians to counteract the myth of Dresden as victim, attracted 2,500 people.

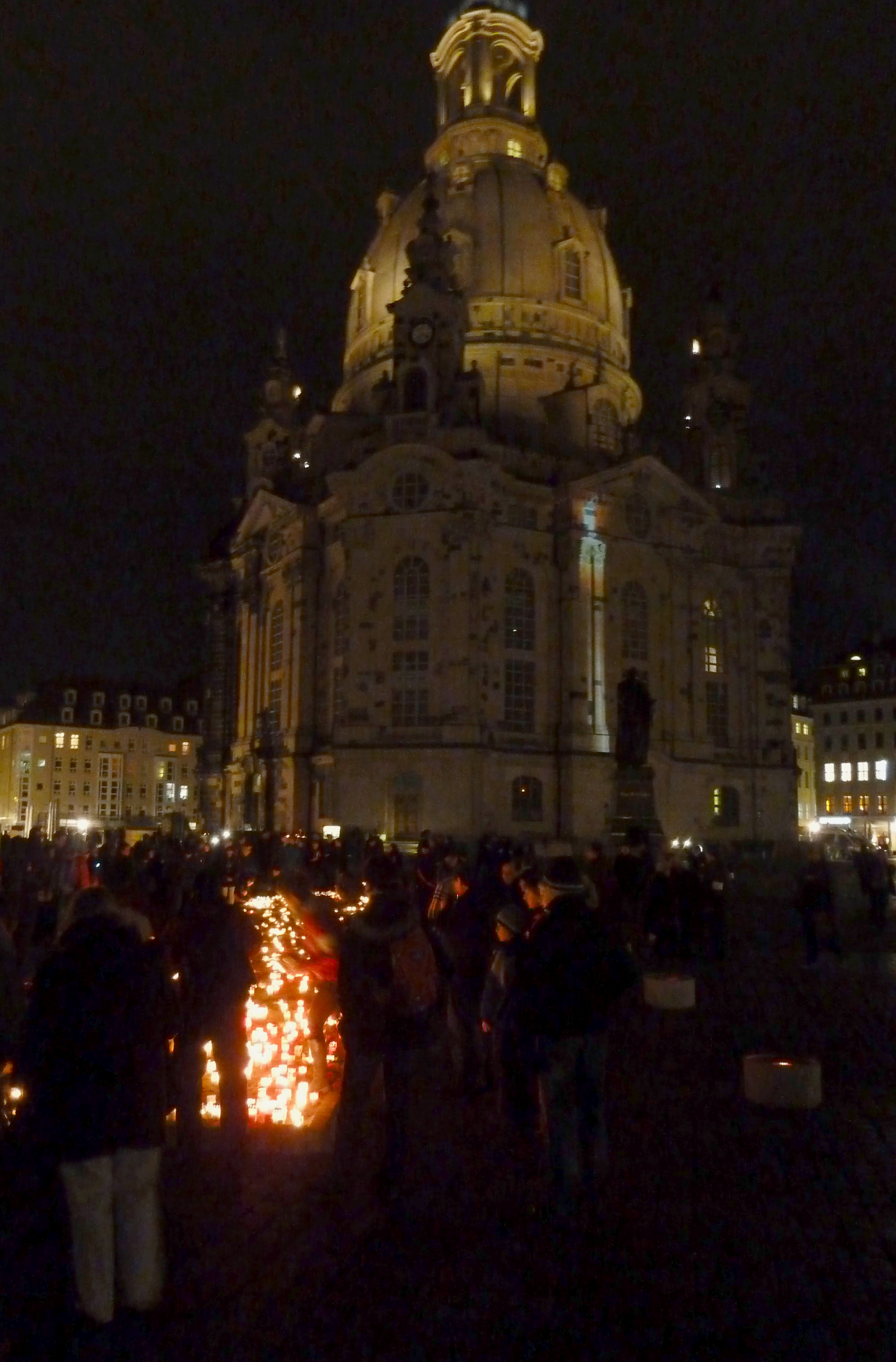
Candles in front of the Frauenkirche, 2014

During the months before 19 February, JLO mobilization for the national Nazi demonstration was anemic. Weeks before the demonstrations, rumors that the Nazis might call off their demonstration spread before they became a certainty. Dresden Nazifrei and No Pasaran mobilized their supporters, however, fearing a last-minute march by another group. Instead, Dresden Nazifrei mobilized a "big antifascist demonstration" to celebrate that the "big Nazi-march seems to be history" and to press their goal of an "anti-fascist consensus". In what a local newspaper called "one of the biggest antifascist demonstrations in post-war Germany", about 10,000 people protested against "Nazis, historical revisionism and repression". The city-controlled Arbeitsgemeinschaft 13. Februar organized a protest against the Nazis at the Schlossplatz square which attracted 1,500 people; its slogan was "Courage, Respect and Tolerance". The ruling Christian Democrats changed their position, now saying that protesting against Nazis was necessary. Arbeitsgemeinschaft 13. Februar, although it did not support the blockades, sought to organize protests "in optical and audible range" of the Nazi march in a more active form of protest.

== Dresden Nazifrei strategy ==
According to Dresden Nazifrei, "We engage in civil disobedience against the Nazi demonstration. We will not escalate conflicts. Our mass blockades consist of people. We are in solidarity with all those who share with us the goal of preventing the Nazi demonstration". Its strategy had been developed by the "Block G8" campaign, which blocked roads around the site of the 2007 G8 summit in Heiligendamm, and other recent major acts of civil disobedience in Germany. The aim was to make the action calculable for participants and police. Dresden Nazifrei provided detailed information on the movements of Nazi groups and police units in the city and about the blockades and actions organized by the alliance via a Twitter feed, texting and a telephone hotline advising protesters.

The alliance used public training in blockade techniques to attract media attention, which helped to spark the mobilization and its assertion that the blockades were a legitimate form of civil disobedience. It sought to penetrate the public consciousness and normalize acts of civil disobedience as part of the politically-accepted repertoire of protest in a politically-conservative city. In 2012, polls indicated that 73 percent of Dresdenites supported peaceful blockades of Nazi marches; 18 percent were opposed, and the remaining nine percent were undecided.

== Aftermath ==
The actions of Dresden Nazifrei and the response of the Saxon police and the ruling conservatives (who criminalized calls to block the Nazi marches, prosecuted participants in blockades, stormed the alliance's media center and prosecuted organizers as "members of a terrorist organization"), the removal of parliamentary immunity from Left Party members who participated in the protests, and the surveillance of mobile phones in the area of the protests of 19 February 2011 provoked debate about what Wolfgang Thierse, head of the German parliament from the Social Democrats, called "Saxonian Democracy". The term summarised the national perception of Saxony and Dresden as a state and city governed by authorities who acted in an aggressive and authoritarian way against the left and non-conservative civil society groups, ignoring Nazis and failing to discover a cell of the National Socialist Underground (NSU) which had operated for years in Saxony.
