= Georg Heinrich Zincke =

German academic (1692–1769)

Georg Heinrich Zincke or Georg Heinrich Zincken (27 September 1692, Altenroda – 15 August 1769, Braunschweig) was a German jurist and cameralist.

Zincke studied theology and philosophy at the University of Jena, before studying jurisprudence at the University of Erfurt and the University of Halle. He was employed as a Prussian civil servant and taught at Halle. Moving to Weimar in 1732, he was denounced by a court rival in 1734 or 1735, was stripped of his property and imprisoned. Pardoned in 1739, he lectured on cameralism at the University of Leipzig from 1740 to 1745, and began to publish a periodical on economics, the Leipziger Sammlungen von Wirthschafftlichen- Policey- Cammer- und Finantz-Sachen (Leipzig Papers on Police, Economic and Finance Matters, 1742-1767). In 1746 he became curator of the Collegium Carolinium in Brunswig.

== Works ==
- Allgemeines oeconomisches Lexicon, 1731 (5th ed., 1820)
