= An der Finne =

- Verbandsgemeinde
- Map of Burgenlandkreis highlighting An der Finne
- Interactive map of An der Finne
- Location within Germany Location within Saxony-Anhalt
- Coordinates: 51°12′N 11°34′E
- Country: Germany
- State: Saxony-Anhalt
- District: Burgenlandkreis
- Seat: Bad Bibra
- Subdivisions: 7 municipalities

Area
  - Total: 257.26 km^{2} (99.33 sq mi)

Population (2025-12-31)
  - Total: 10,937
  - Density: 42.513/km^{2} (110.11/sq mi)
- Time zone: UTC+01:00 (CET)
  - Summer (DST): UTC+02:00 (CEST)
- Website: www.vgem-finne.de

An der Finne is a Verbandsgemeinde ("collective municipality") in the Burgenlandkreis (district), in Saxony-Anhalt, Germany. Before the 1 July 2009 local government reform, it was a Verwaltungsgemeinschaft, covering the same area, but subdivided into more municipalities. It is named after the Finne, a range of hills between Lossa and Eckartsberga. It is situated approximately 20 km west of Naumburg, and 25 km northeast of Weimar. The seat of the Verwaltungsgemeinschaft is in Bad Bibra, with a branch office in Eckartsberga.

The Verbandsgemeinde An der Finne consists of the following municipalities:

1. An der Poststraße
2. Bad Bibra
3. Eckartsberga
4. Finne
5. Finneland
6. Kaiserpfalz
7. Lanitz-Hassel-Tal
