= Golzen =

- Stadtteil of Bad Bibra
- Interactive map of Golzen
- Location within Germany Location within Saxony-Anhalt
- Coordinates: 51°13′N 11°38′E
- Country: Germany
- State: Saxony-Anhalt
- District: Burgenlandkreis
- Town: Bad Bibra

Area
  - Total: 7.45 km^{2} (2.88 sq mi)
- Elevation: 162 m (531 ft)

Population (2006-12-31)
  - Total: 210
  - Density: 28/km^{2} (73/sq mi)
- Time zone: UTC+01:00 (CET)
  - Summer (DST): UTC+02:00 (CEST)
- Postal codes: 06636
- Dialling codes: 034462

Golzen is a village and a former municipality in the Burgenlandkreis district, in Saxony-Anhalt, Germany. Since 1 July 2009, it is part of the town Bad Bibra.
