= Thalwinkel =

- Stadtteil of Bad Bibra
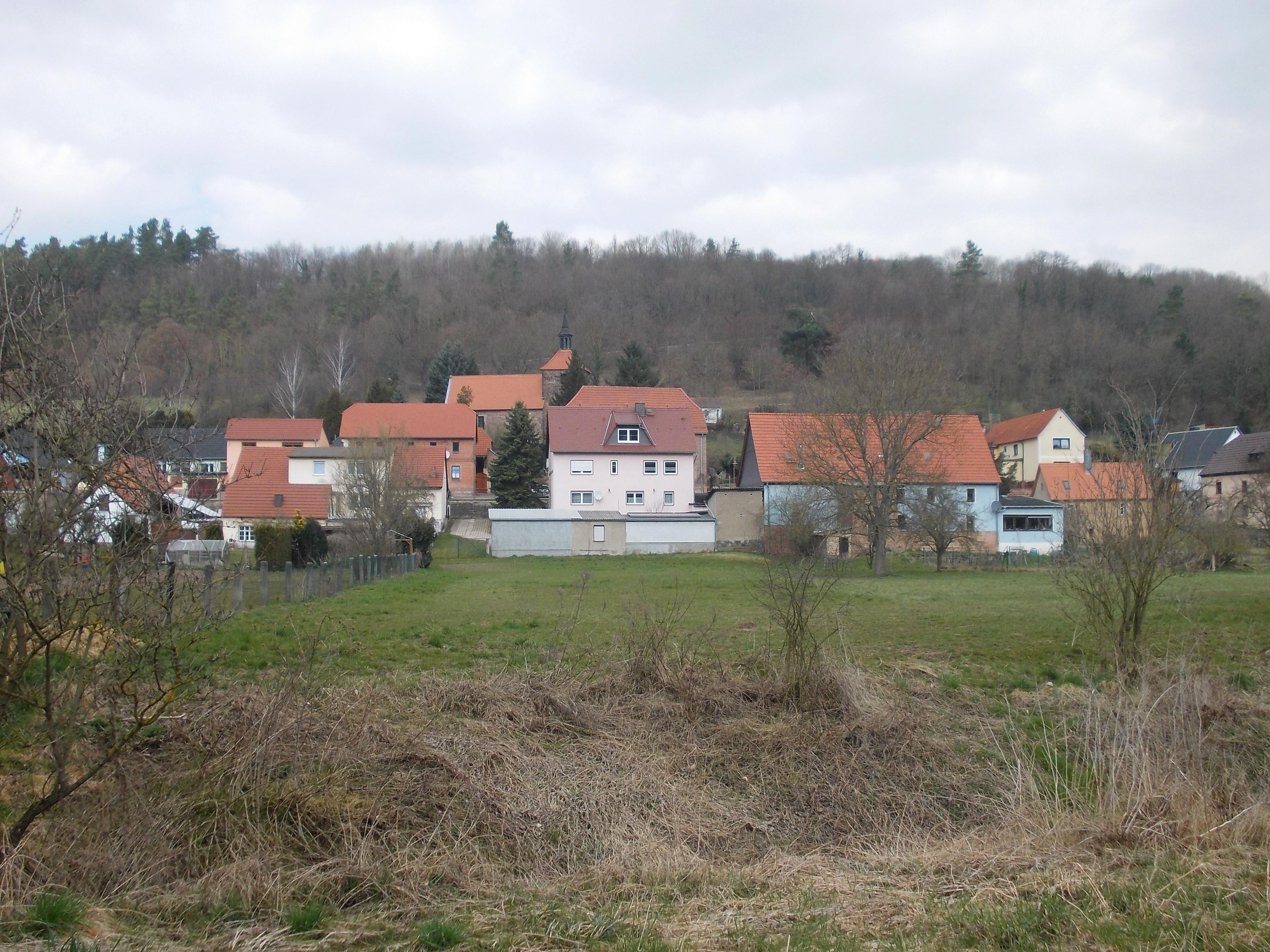
- Thalwinkel seen from the south
- Interactive map of Thalwinkel
- Location within Germany Location within Saxony-Anhalt
- Coordinates: 51°13′N 11°36′E
- Country: Germany
- State: Saxony-Anhalt
- District: Burgenlandkreis
- Town: Bad Bibra

Area
  - Total: 5.97 km^{2} (2.31 sq mi)
- Elevation: 181 m (594 ft)

Population (2006-12-31)
  - Total: 189
  - Density: 31.7/km^{2} (82.0/sq mi)
- Time zone: UTC+01:00 (CET)
  - Summer (DST): UTC+02:00 (CEST)
- Postal codes: 06647
- Dialling codes: 034465

Thalwinkel is a village and a former municipality in the Burgenlandkreis district, in Saxony-Anhalt, Germany. Since 1 July 2009, it is part of the town Bad Bibra.
