= Deutsches Reichsbräu =

German beer

- Logo
- Type: Pilsner
- Country of origin: Germany
- Introduced: 2020
- Alcohol by volume: 4.9%
- Website: www.xn--reichsbru-22a.de

Deutsches Reichsbräu (lit. 'German Reich beer' in German) is a German beer brewed by Tommy Frenck. It is a pilsner with a 4.9% alcohol volume. The brand generated controversy for its use of Nazi-style imagery.

== Design ==
The beer uses a brown label, which media reports alleged to be a reference to the Sturmabteilung (SA, also known as Brownshirts). The logo comprises a Reichsadler eagle and Iron Cross with the name of the beer below it in Gothic script.

== History ==
The beer was originally offered for sale on Neo-Nazi websites in January 2020. Frenck said that he came up with the idea after the police enforced an alcohol ban at a neo-Nazi festival at Vessra Abbey. In the same year, the beer was sold in a liquor store in the town of Bad Bibra, Saxony-Anhalt, where it sold out. This activity was discovered by the District Chief, Götz Ulrich, on Holocaust Memorial Day. The beer was being sold at €18.88 a case, which was understood to be Neo-Nazi code with "18" standing for "AH" (Adolf Hitler) and "88" standing for "Heil Hitler."

The police were called to investigate because of this Nazi-style imagery. Since the symbols used on the beer label are not banned under the Strafgesetzbuch section 86a and no swastikas appeared, the police ruled that the product was not illegal. The liquor store was an independent franchisee of Getränke-Quelle, which ordered the shop not to sell any more and terminated their franchise agreement. Frenck had been selling Deutsches Reichsbräu at his own pub in the meantime. The Scottish brewer BrewDog responded to this incident by creating an advert posted on a trailer parked outside Frenck's pub, which proclaimed, "Wenn du nur eine Hautfarbe magst, kannst Du mit mehr als 30 Sorten eh nichts anfangen" ("If you only like one skin colour, you can't do anything with more than 30 varieties anyway").
