= Rigaer Straße =

Street in Berlin, Germany

Coordinates: 52.516°N 13.465°E

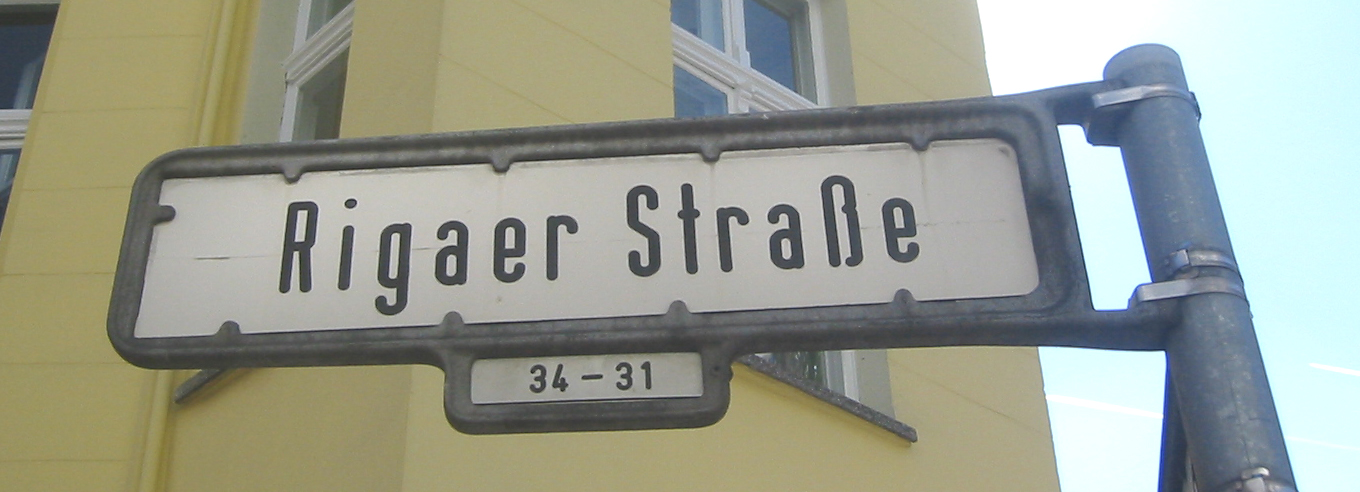

Rigaer Straße is a street in Friedrichshain, Berlin that runs from Bersarinplatz in the west to the railway station Frankfurter Allee in the east. The street is named after the Latvian capital Riga.

Many of the houses on the street are protected as historic buildings, although some of the older houses have turned into squats.

Famous residents of Rigaer Straße include German author Theodor Plievier, who, around 1924, lived at number 68.
