= Gruppe Freital =

The Group Freital (also Freital vigilante, Bürgerwehr FTL/360 or FTL/360) was an armed German right-wing anti-immigrant group in Freital near Dresden active during the 2015 European migrant crisis.

== History ==
Members of the group have attacked asylum accommodations with explosives and conducted several attacks on refugee supporters. Members of FTL/360 received support from some citizens of Freital and met in a pub of an AfD member on a regular term.

Members of Gruppe Freital had first met in the summer of 2015 during protests against a refugee home in Freital, Saxony. Timo Schulz, a neo-Nazi originally from Hamburg, worked as a bus driver in Freital and was leader of the terrorist gang. On July 27, 2015, members of the Freital Gruppe threw an explosive device near the vehicle of Die Linke politician Michael Richter in Freital. Weeks later, members of FTL/360 threw fireworks at an apartment building housing refugees in the town, the attack only left shattered windows.

In March 2016 federal police GSG9 arrested five members of FTL/360 in Freital. Later, seven men and one woman were accused of terrorist crimes. An attack on a refugee apartment was assessed by the Higher Regional Court of Dresden (Oberlandesgericht Dresden) as an attempted murder: FTL/360 members threw an explosive device at a refugee home in Frietal, the bomb dropped in the bedroom of refugees while they were sleeping. The attack left one Syrian refugee wounded by broken glass as a result of the explosion.

In March 2018, members of FTL/360 were convicted for founding a terrorist organization, aiding on abetting crimes and attempted murder.
