= Altenroda =

- Stadtteil of Bad Bibra
- Interactive map of Altenroda
- Location within Germany Location within Saxony-Anhalt
- Coordinates: 51°14′N 11°34′E
- Country: Germany
- State: Saxony-Anhalt
- District: Burgenlandkreis
- Town: Bad Bibra

Area
  - Total: 14.34 km^{2} (5.54 sq mi)
- Elevation: 240 m (790 ft)

Population (2006-12-31)
  - Total: 567
  - Density: 39.5/km^{2} (102/sq mi)
- Time zone: UTC+01:00 (CET)
  - Summer (DST): UTC+02:00 (CEST)
- Postal codes: 06642
- Dialling codes: 034465
- Vehicle registration: BLK
- Website: www.vgem-finne.de

Altenroda is a village and a former municipality in the Burgenlandkreis district, in Saxony-Anhalt, Germany. Since 1 July 2009, it is part of the town Bad Bibra.
