= Junge Landsmannschaft Ostdeutschland =

Young Homeland Association of East Germany Junge Landsmannschaft Ostdeutschland

Junge Landsmannschaft Ostdeutschland (Young Homeland Association of East Germany – JLO) is a German youth organization, that the Federal Office for the Protection of the Constitution has categorized as "right-wing extremist". Most of its activities take place in the eastern parts of Germany. Its regional branch in Saxony organized the annual marches to commemorate the Bombing of Dresden in World War II until 2012. A Bloomberg report claims it has ties to the National Democratic Party of Germany.

In February 2009, the National Democratic Party and the JLO organized a demonstration on the anniversary of the bombing of Dresden in World War II. Approximately 6,000 people took part in the event. On February 13, 2010, as both organizations attempted again to march through Dresden, more than 10.000 counter-demonstrators blocked the participants from marching through the city, and about 6,000 supporters held a rally in a space adjacent to the Dresden-Neustadt train station, surrounded by police blockades.

In February 2012, with regard to the widespread resistance from other groups to the JLO organized marches in previous years the JLO announced that all marches for that year were cancelled.

In January 2011, the JLO "Saxony-Silesia" regional branch nominated Alfred-Maurice de Zayas for the Nobel Peace Prize for services rendered to the German expellées.

== See also ==
- New states of Germany

== Bibliography ==
- Chapin, Wesley D. (1997). Germany for the Germans?. Greenwood Publishing Group. ISBN 978-0-313-30258-9.
