= Bad Bibra =

- Town
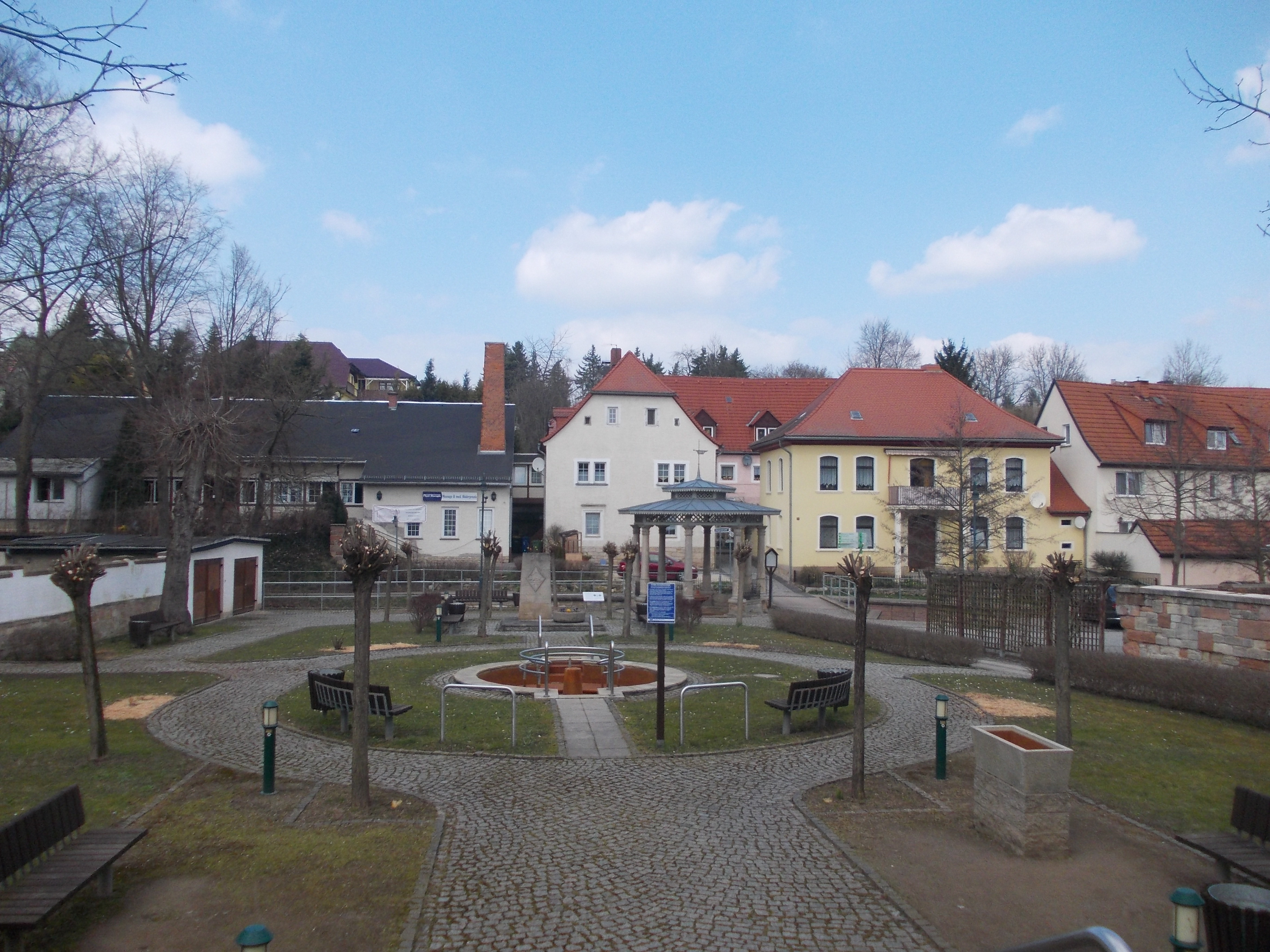
- Town square

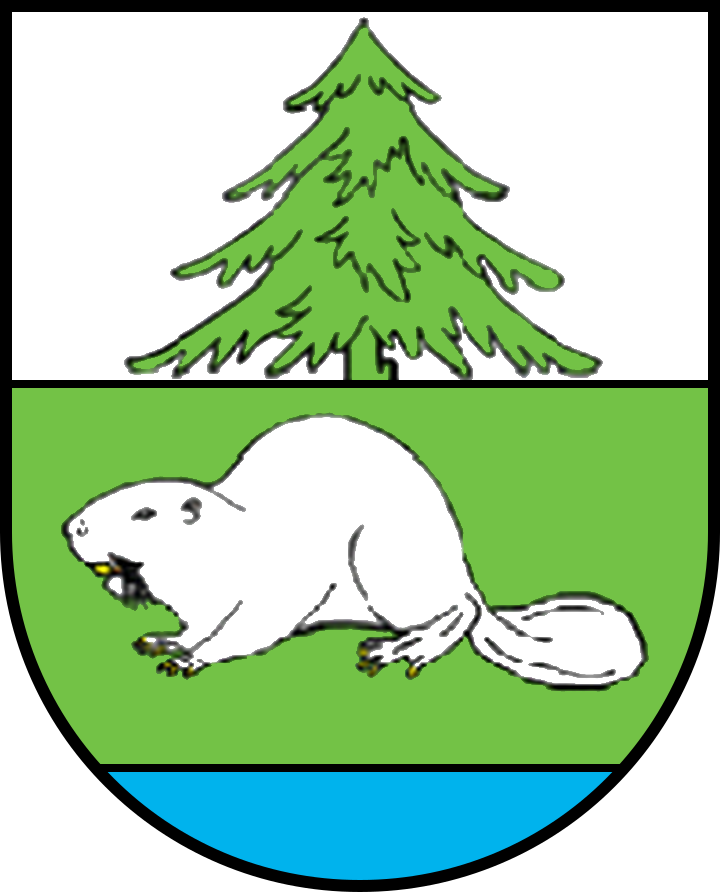
- Coat of arms

- Location of Bad Bibra within Burgenlandkreis district
- Interactive map of Bad Bibra
- Location within Germany Location within Saxony-Anhalt
- Coordinates: 51°12′N 11°34′E
- Country: Germany
- State: Saxony-Anhalt
- District: Burgenlandkreis
- Municipal assoc.: An der Finne

Government
  - Mayor (2023–30): Frederik Sandner

Area
  - Total: 49.77 km^{2} (19.22 sq mi)
- Elevation: 152 m (499 ft)

Population (2025-12-31)
  - Total: 2,498
  - Density: 50.19/km^{2} (130.0/sq mi)
- Time zone: UTC+01:00 (CET)
  - Summer (DST): UTC+02:00 (CEST)
- Postal codes: 06647
- Dialling codes: 034465
- Vehicle registration: BLK
- Website: www.bad-bibra.de

Bad Bibra (German: [baːt ˈbiːbʁa]) is a town in the Burgenlandkreis district, in Saxony-Anhalt, Germany. It is situated northwest of Naumburg. It is part of the Verbandsgemeinde ("collective municipality") An der Finne. Since July 2009 it has included the former municipalities of Altenroda, Golzen and Thalwinkel. In 2020, the town gained media attention for selling Deutsches Reichsbräu, a neo-Nazi style beer.

== Personality ==
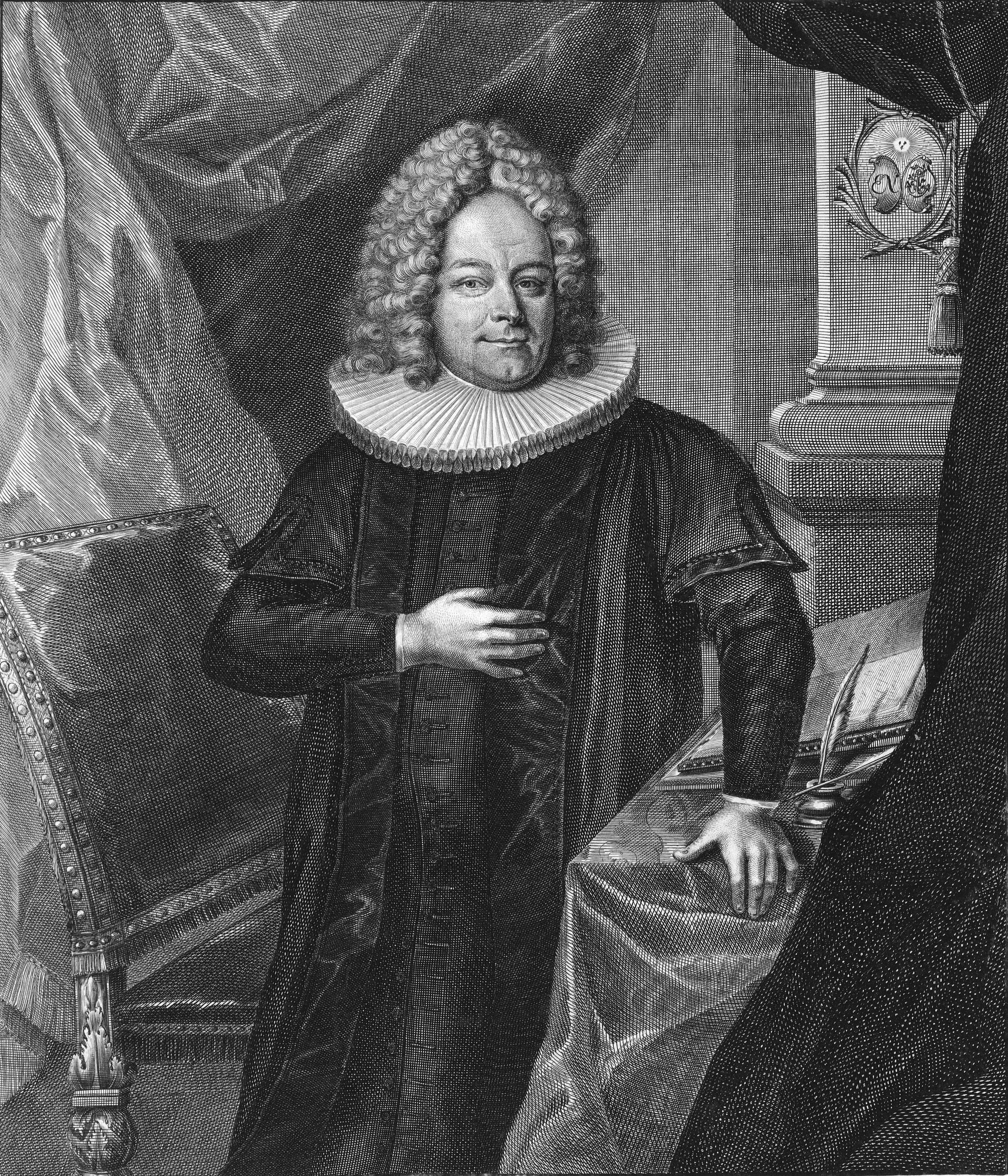
Erdmann Neumeister 1719

- Erdmann Neumeister (1671-1756), hymns poet and theologian; from 1696 pastor in Bibra and to 1700/1702 author of the poem "Nachdenckliche Betrachtungen des curieusen Brunnengastes zu Biebra".(Considerations about the spa tourists in Biebra)
- Christoph Förster (1693-1745), composer and violinist
- Friedrich Zippel (1887-1960) was a Protestant priest, a member of the Confessing Church (BK), NS Victim and prisoner in Dachau concentration camp.
- Friedrich August Ludwig Nietzsche (1756-1826) in Eilenburg), German theologian, grandfather of the philosopher Friedrich Nietzsche.
