= 2010 Dresden anti-fascist blockade =

The poster used by Dresden Without Nazis to mobilize for the counter-demonstration, in January 2010.

The 2010 Dresden anti-fascist blockade, organized by the umbrella group Dresden Without Nazis (Dresden nazifrei), an anti-fascist alliance of several German organizations, was a counter-demonstration against a planned march of neo-Nazis in Dresden on 13 February 2010. The Dresden Without Nazis alliance is supported by anti-fascist organizations as well as politicians from the Left Party, the Green Party and the Social Democratic Party and leading members of trade unions. The alliance coordinated large, peaceful blockades consisting of large crowds of people to stop the neo-Nazi demonstration, a strategy that was successful in preventing the neo-Nazis from marching through Dresden.

== Supporters ==
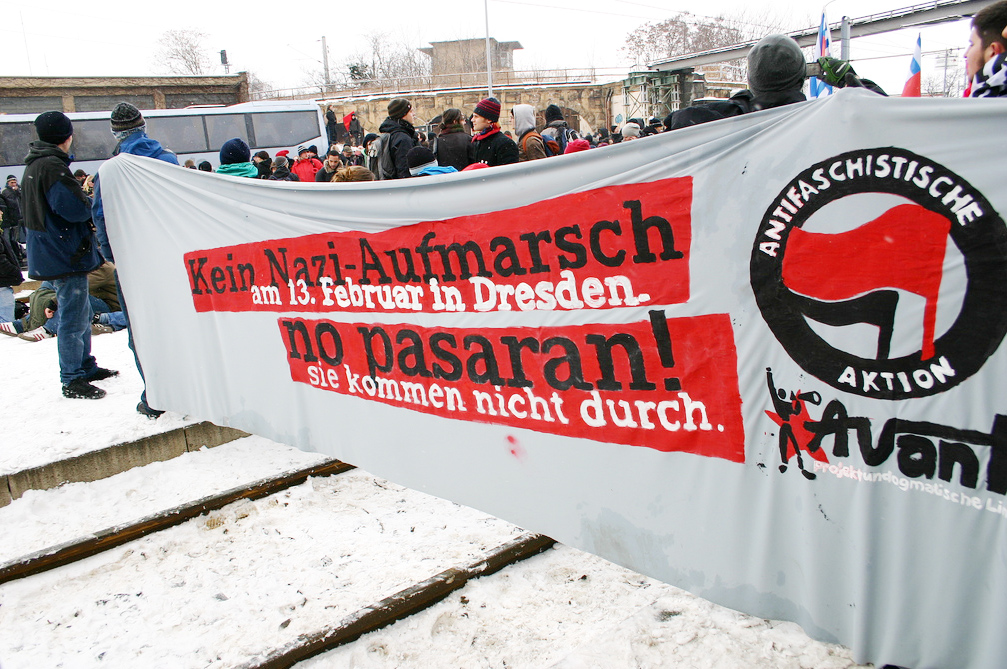
The group "No pasarán" ("They shall not pass") is one of the supporters of the Dresden Without Nazis alliance.

Supporters of Dresden Without Nazis include local and regional anti-fascist groups, the nationwide anti-fascist associations "No pasarán!" and "VVN-BdA", artists such as Konstantin Wecker and Die Toten Hosen, politicians from the Left Party, the Green Party and the Social Democratic Party and leading members of trade unions.

== Activities ==
Dresden Without Nazis was set up to mobilize against a planned march of neo-Nazis in Dresden on 13 February 2010, the biggest Nazi activity in Europe. The coalition advocated large, peaceful blockades consisting of large crowds of people as a means to stop neo-Nazi demonstrations. Its consensus on the form of action to be taken against the neo-Nazis reads: "We engage in civil disobedience against the Nazi demonstration. We will not escalate conflicts. Our mass blockades consist of people. We are in solidarity with all those who share with us the goal of preventing the Nazi demonstration."

On 19 January 2010, police units searched premises used by the alliance in Dresden and Berlin, and confiscated computers, as well as posters. Politicians of the Left Party and the Green Party criticized the seizure. According to the Prosecutors Office, the slogan "Gemeinsam blockieren" ("Blocking together"), used on the poster, constituted a call to violate the law.

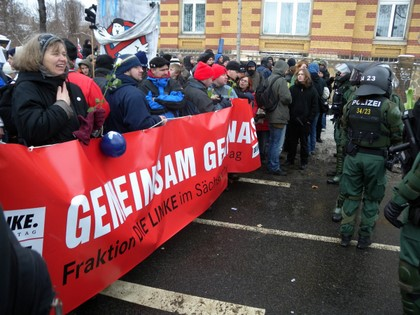
People blocking the planned neo-Nazi demonstration in Dresden on 13 February 2010

On 13 February 2010, neo-Nazi groups gathered in Dresden to stage a "mourning march" on the 65th anniversary of the bombing of the city in World War II, which they describe as a "bombing holocaust". Until 2010, the march, organized by the National Democratic Party and the Junge Landsmannschaft Ostdeutschland, was the largest yearly demonstration organized by neo-Nazis in Europe. On 13 February 1945 the city was bombed by Allied planes, resulting in the death of an estimated 25,000 inhabitants, and official ceremonies to commemorate the dead take place in Dresden every year.

Coordinated by the alliance Dresden Without Nazis, which organized several rallies that took place in the area, between 10,000 and 15,000 demonstrators surrounded the train station of the Neustadt district of Dresden, where the neo-Nazi demonstration was supposed to begin. In the city center, an additional 10,000 people took part in a human chain that symbolically protected the city against the Nazis. While about 6,000 Nazis held a rally in a confined space adjacent to the Neustadt train station, more than 5,000 police separated the opposing groups. Police then declared the blockades to be intractable, did not allow the neo-Nazis to march, and ordered them to leave the area by train.
