= Action Front of National Socialists/National Activists =

German neo-Nazi organization banned in 1983

ANS/NA flag

Alternate flag

The Action Front of National Socialists/National Activists (German: Aktionsfront Nationaler Sozialisten/Nationale Aktivisten; abbreviated ANS/NA) was a West German neo-Nazi organization founded in 1977 by Michael Kühnen under the name "Action Front of National Socialists" (ANS). It was based around a group of young neo-Nazis in Hamburg. Upon founding the group Kühnen declared "we are a revolutionary party dedicated to restoring the values of the Third Reich" and adopted a version of the Nazi flag in which the swastika was reversed, with the spaces black and the actual cross blending into the background, as their organization's emblem. He sought to link his movement with other groups, by seeking links with Waffen-SS veterans organisations, sending a delegation to the Order of Flemish Militants-organised international neo-Nazi rallies in Diksmuide and working closely with the Wiking-Jugend.

== History ==
The ANS quickly gained a reputation for provocative action, attracting much attention in 1978 when its members clashed with police after staging a "Justice for Hitler" rally. In 1977 and 1978, ANS members robbed a number of banks and stole weapons from military bases. Accused of planning to bomb NATO facilities and a memorial for the victims of the Bergen-Belsen concentration camp and wanting to liberate Rudolf Hess, a former Nazi politician, from prison, six members were arrested and convicted to eleven years in prison. Kühnen, himself, was jailed for inciting racial hatred and violence in 1979 after being charged with setting up a terrorist organisation. While in prison, Kühnen wrote Die zweite Revolution (The second Revolution), a program for the ANS. The title referred to the SA leader Ernst Röhm's plans in 1934. Because Kühnen played such a central role in the organization, its activities diminished considerably during his imprisonment. In 1981, Johannes Bügner, a former member of the ANS, was killed by five ANS members for leaving the group and for allegedly being gay.

Despite Kühnen's imprisonment, the group continued and, after Kühnen was released from prison in November 1982, it merged with the National Activists (Nationale Aktivisten), a like-minded movement based in Frankfurt, under the leadership of Arndt-Heinz Marx, and in Fulda, where it included Thomas Brehl. Among the ANS/NA's other leading members were Christian Worch and Bela Ewald Althans.

By 1983 the group had some 270 members with other thirty local organisations or "comradeships" (Kameradschaften) and continued to attract attention by holding rallies and leafleting events and posting bills and graffiti. Consisting of both a legal and a clandestine wing, the organization's structure was modeled on Hitler's SA. Its five central goals were ending Germany's ban on the Nazi Party, the expulsion of non-Germans from the country, protecting the environment, opposing the United States, and finally the unification of a neutral and socialist Germany. The organization worked closely with Gary Lauck, a German-American neo-Nazi in Nebraska, and his NSDAP/AO. This organization published literature, stickers and the like illegal under Germany's ban on Nazi propaganda and exported it to Germany and the ANS/NA.

However the ANS/NA was banned by the Ministry of the Interior in 1983 and Kühnen fled to France, but was soon deported back to Germany. The ban was not unexpected and most of its members resurfaced in a group called Die Bewegung (the Movement) and in the Free German Workers' Party (Freie Deutsche Arbeiterpartei; FAP), a political party linked to Die Bewegung. The group was officially dissolved on 7 December. A minor political party that had stood for election in the 1983 election to the Landtag of Hesse, Aktion Ausländerrückführung – Volksbewegung gegen Überfremdung und Umweltzerstörung, was banned at the same time after being adjudged a front movement of ANS/NA.

Kühnen re-emerged soon afterwards with a new group called Nationale Sammlung, although this too was banned in 1989. Following this he began a tactic of regularly forming new movements in an attempt to keep ahead of any bans, a policy he continued to exercise until his death in 1991.

== Bibliography ==
- "Solche Elemente", Der Spiegel 24/1981. p. 104
- "Unser Traum", Der Spiegel 42/1984, pp. 110-113.
- Jeffrey M. Bale, "Kühnen, Michael (1955-1991)", Cyprian Blamires, "World Fascism: A Historical Encyclopedia", Volume 2, ABC-CLIO, 2006
- Christopher T. Husbands, "Militant Neo-Nazism in the Federal Republic of Germany in the 1980s", Luciano Cheles, Ronnie Ferguson & Michalina Vaughan, Neo-Fascism in Europe, Longman, 1991, pp. 86–119
- Martin A. Lee, The Beast Reawakens, Warner Books, 1997
- Lee McGowan, The Radical Right in Germany: 1870 To the Present, Pearson Education, 2002
- Armin Pfahl-Traughber, Rechtsextremismus in der Bundesrepublik, Beck, 2006
