= István Győrkös =

Hungarian far-right political activist and convicted murderer

- Born: 20 November 1940 (age 85)
- Years active: 1989–2016
- Known for: Neo-Nazi and Hungarist activist
- Children: István Jr. Kolos; Csaba (d. 2013)

István Győrkös (born 20 November 1940) is a Hungarian far-right political figure and convicted murderer. He was the founder and leader of the Hungarist and neo-Nazi paramilitary movement Hungarian National Front (MNA) from 1989 to 2016. He had been a leading and prominent figure in Hungarian extremist and neo-Nazi politics in the 1990s. In 1995, he proclaimed himself the sole leader of the Hungarist movement under the title Vezető ("Leader"), a term similar to Duce (Italian) for Benito Mussolini, Führer (German) for Adolf Hitler and Nemzetvezető (Hungarian) for Ferenc Szálasi.

Győrkös fatally shot a police officer during a search of his property in Bőny, Győr-Moson-Sopron County on 26 October 2016. In 2019, he was found guilty of murder and sentenced to life in prison.

== Biography ==
=== Early life ===
Despite his rapid rise by the early 1990s to become the "leader of the neo-Nazis in Hungary", as a 1995 academic work by Sabrina P. Ramet referred to Győrkös, not much was publicly known about him before the transition to democracy in 1989. According to himself, he participated in the Hungarian Revolution of 1956.

After the uprising was crushed by the Soviet invasion, Győrkös was arrested and imprisoned by the new pro-Soviet regime. He spent his sentence for his "crime against the state" from September 1961 to April 1963. In jail, his political views were influenced by former Arrow Cross Party-member cellmates. Thereafter, Győrkös identified himself as National Socialist and Hungarist (the ideology of the war-time Arrow Cross Party). Other sources claim Győrkös lived in emigration for some time after release from prison. There is no report of his political activity after his release, but National Socialist and anti-Soviet propaganda rapidly appeared in his residence Győr since the early 1980s. According to Paul Hockenos, Győrkös was an unemployed electrical engineer during the early 1990s.

=== Hungarist leader ===
Based in Győr, he founded the Hungarian National Socialist Action Group in 1989 (according to other sources, in January 1991), a fascist and neo-Nazi civil organization, which functioned under the cover of the Peregrine Falcon Hiker Association. The movement intended to transform itself into a mass-based political party based on the heritage of the war-time Arrow Cross Party. After the Second World War and the execution of party leader Ferenc Szálasi, the Hungarist Movement went to emigration led by Árpád Henney, who served as Minister besides the Leader of the Nation (Szálasi's title) in the "Government of National Unity". Henney died in 1980, he was succeeded by Imre Tarjányi-Tatár, who had a good relationship with Győrkös. Tarjányi-Tatár was unable to unify the Hungarist movement which suffered from constant internal strife. Győrkös' movement in Hungary under these conditions became increasingly dominant and decisive. According to historian Tibor Tóth, the elderly and ailing Tarjányi-Tatár proclaimed Győrkös as his heir as the leader of the Hungarist movement.

Győrkös maintained contacts with other domestic neo-Nazi and fascist groups and skinhead organizations. He also established international relations with foreign extremist right organizations, including Austrian neo-Nazi leader Gottfried Küssel's Covenant of the New Front (German: Gesinnungsgemeinschaft der Neuen Front). As a result, then Hungarian National Police Chief Sándor Pintér moved to Vienna to consult with his Austrian counterpart, indicating Győrkös' threat to the national security. Győrkös and his followers received inciting propaganda materials from the American-based NSDAP Development and Foreign Organization (NSDAP/AO) for his own periodical, Új Rend ("New Order"), according to an intelligence report.

Flag of the Hungarian National Front (MNA)

The Hungarian National Socialist Action Group was the first organization which used the controversial and divisive flag with Árpád stripes after the fall of Communism. On 18–19 January 1992, Győrkös and six other members were arrested after perquisitions which found and confiscated large arsenal of Soviet-era firearms, training grenades, gas pistols and other light weaponry. Győrkös was charged with inciting hatred against minorities (Jews and Romani people) and foreigners, and the illegal possession of firearms. He was sentenced to a one-year suspended imprisonment in February 1993. Győrkös's arrest was part of an international cooperation between authorities to take action against far-right movements (in the same days, Küssel was detained in Austria). Some argue that, Győrkös actively played in the organization of that event when a group of far-right young skinheads hissed and booed President Árpád Göncz, who delivered his annual memorial speech at Kossuth Square on the national day of 23 October 1992. The Hungarian National Socialist Action Group adopted its current name (Hungarian National Front, MNA) on 29 November 1992, after a court ruled to ban National Socialist name and symbols.

The MNA declared that it does not recognise any government after the "removal" of Ferenc Szálasi by the Soviet invasion in March 1945. Győrkös was also trying to reach to rehabilitate Szálasi and nullify his death sentence by the People's Tribunal in March 1946. "Why shouldn't it [the Arrow Cross movement] be accepted? Romanian society is prepared for Marshal Antonescu and the Slovaks have named a square after Tiso. [...] The Hungarist idea [...] will remain topical as long as Hungary exists", argued. Győrkös' activity have attracted significant international attention in the early 1990s. The Nouvel Observateur wrote about Győrkös in June 1993, that he is "a convinced neo-fascist, who most overtly emphasizes in interviews that he works for the preparation of a National Socialist state in Hungary".

Győrkös' hegemonic rule in the domestic Hungarist movement has been broken in parallel with the rise of Albert Szabó who was sent to Hungary by the Australian-based Hungarist emigration group and founded the Party for World-National People's Supremacy (VNP) on 21 June 1993. Szabó organized sizable uniformed marches (with armbands) which caused the media's attention directed to his movement. Through the mediation of Imre Tarjányi-Tatár, the Hungarists transformed themselves into an official party organization with the participation of Albert Szabó's Party for World-National People's Supremacy, István Győrkös' Hungarian National Front and György Ekrem-Kemál's Association of Those Persecuted by Communism (KÜSZ). The Hungarian Hungarist Movement (Hungarian: Magyar Hungarista Mozgalom, MHM) officially formed on 20 April 1994, the birthday of Adolf Hitler. The three leading figures were elected co-chairs of the new far-right party. They announced the party foundation in a joint press conference on 27 April, under scandalous circumstances (along with Szálasi quotes, portrait, Nazi salutes and Hungarist uniforms). Two days later both Szabó and Győrkös were arrested and imprisoned in custody for charges of incitement against the community and use of banned totalitarian symbols. They were released on 25 July and the charges were dropped by the Metropolitan Court in that year, referring to freedom of expression, and this decision was also confirmed by the Supreme Court in 1996. However the Hungarian Hungarist Movement was dissolved by the Metropolitan Court on 20 September 1994. After that Szabó founded his new party, the Hungarian Welfare Alliance (MNSZ), and the loose confederation between the neo-Nazi organizations gradually broke up, even after the death of Tarjányi-Tatár in 1995. Contemporary opinions claimed Győrkös had significant role in this process, as he wanted to build a hegemonic role within the movement and declared himself the sole and incontestable leader of the Hungarist ideology.

Due to the organizational work with the skinhead groups, the MNA remained the only major Hungarist organization by the second half of the 1990s (while Albert Szabó abolished his party and returned to Australia). As manifestation of this status, the first Day of Honour was held on 15 February 1997, which commemorated the Hungarian and German (mostly Waffen-SS) soldiers (they called "heroic defenders"), who died fighting against the Soviet troops in the Siege of Budapest. It was followed by two other events on 14 February 1998 and 13 February 1999, and soon this commemoration became the most important event at the Hungarian far-right political sphere. These first events were also attended by foreign (German, American etc.) skinhead groups. In 1999, there were serious clashes between the neo-Nazis and the police, several policemen were injured.

=== Marginalization and ideological turn ===
With the emergence of the Hungarian Justice and Life Party (MIÉP), then the Movement for a Better Hungary (Jobbik), the far-right politics approached the mainstream sphere, while the Hungarist movement declined and marginalized. Despite the successful cooperation and international relations, Győrkös decided to split with the skinhead groups. The MNA represented an "elitist attitude" and considered the skinheads as "incapable", because he thought that "they were not suitable for determined work to build the nation", as he told in an interview. The Hungarian branch of the Blood & Honour quit from the MNA in 2001, and other skinhead organizations such as the Hungaria Skins also broke the relationship with Győrkös' movement. Another Hungarist organization, the Pax Hungarica Movement (PHM) was founded on 26 January 2008, which claimed itself to based on "real" Hungarist (nationalist, Christian socialist and royalist) values. The Jobbik began to organize "Breakout" memorial tours since 2010, overshadowing the MNA's "Day of Honour" events. Due to financial reasons, the Sixty-Four Counties Youth Movement (HVIM) and its other allies took over the organization of the annual commemoration. However the MNA continued to organize paramilitary summer camps and trainings for the youth in Bőny, the residence of Győrkös.

Meanwhile, the MNA under the leadership of the Győrkös family went through an ideological turn. According to a critical far-right voice, the organization claimed their admiration towards the North Korean, Russian, Chinese and other Communist-type regimes since the 2010s. Győrkös also made a distinction between Communist and National Communist systems. Adopting several Communist elements, he called his new ideology with "Neo-Hungarist" term (which, he argued, responds to the challenges of the modern age), consequently isolating himself and the MNA within the far-right sphere (while PHM remained the most notable representative of "orthodox Hungarism"). The Hídfő.net was launched by Győrkös' movement in 2012, which published pro-Russian news and opinions. The website became the "main Hungarian-language source of Russian propaganda", which followed the concept of Eurasianism and national communism, developed by Aleksandr Dugin, a Russian political scientist and chief ideologist of Vladimir Putin. An Index.hu article claimed the MNA had established ties to Russian diplomats, who sometimes participated in military trainings at Bőny too. Later the Hídfő.net was handed over directly to Russian intelligence, and the site even moved to a new Russian domain, Hidfő.ru, as the Index.hu analysis assumed.

In November 2012, the MNA and the Hungarian Workers' Party led by Gyula Thürmer held a joint protest in Érd during an official eviction. Thürmer and István Győrkös, Jr. both gave a speech. As a result, there was a split within MNA under the leadership of Gábor Szalma, who disagreed with the new policy stance. According to the "separatists", based in Borsod-Abaúj-Zemplén County, who were in the majority and also reserved the name of the organization, Győrkös "questioned the Hungarism's Christian basics" and they criticized Győrkös's "imprudent infatuation with Russia". In 2013, Győrkös also distanced himself from the terms "Hungarism" and "National Socialism" and adopted a new ideology, called "Popular Socialism". Several members of the leadership of MNA at that time also had a dispute over financial issues with István, Jr., who embezzled the organization's funds, as they claimed. After the split, Hídfő.net became the official portal of the Győrkös-led MNA, while Jövőnk.info remained in the hand of the Szalma-led MNA.

In November 2013, Győrkös organized an event called "Night of Purification" (in analogy to Kristallnacht) across the country, but with very limited participation, where bonfires were made from books written by Jewish authors (especially Miklós Radnóti's poems) and left-wing newspapers, which declared "soul poisioning" by the MNA.

=== 2016 shooting ===
On 26 October 2016, two detectives of the National Bureau of Investigation (NNI) arrived to Győrkös' property in Bőny to investigate a complaint of illegal weapons during a house search. According to the daily Magyar Idők, the official procedure connected to the investigation of the 2016 Budapest bombing occurred on 24 September 2016. However Győrkös was not cooperating and opened fire with a Kalashnikov rifle on the two police officers, while they entered the house entrance. One of them, principal detective Péter Pálvölgyi, aged 46, was shot in the head and died at the scene. According to Lokál, Győrkös' wife tried to disarm her husband, but without success (later that day she suffered a heart attack). Pálvölgyi's partner returned fire and shot Győrkös in the back and the bullet exited through his stomach. After that Győrkös locked himself inside the house and threatened further shootings. Thereafter, the special units of Counter Terrorism Centre (TEK) arrived at the crime scene, and Director-General János Hajdu negotiated with Győrkös by telephone, when it became apparent that Győrkös' health condition was deteriorating due to his wound, and officers were sent in the house to disarm him. Győrkös was taken to hospital in Győr and was in stable condition, as none of his vital organs were affected by the bullet.

Several experts criticized the unprofessional procedure and the lack of cooperation between the National Bureau of Investigation (NNI) and the Counter Terrorism Centre (TEK). Despite intelligence reports, which confirmed that Győrkös owned firearms and explosives illegally, the NNI had sent only two detectives, while not informing the TEK of their authority procedure, despite the general instruction of the Ministry of Interior in similar situations. The National Bureau of Investigation launched an internal investigation on 28 October, while Győrkös was placed in pre-trial detention after surgery and transferred from Győr to the jail hospital at Tököl. The Heti Világgazdaság published exclusive details on 3 November. According to the weekly's website (hvg.hu), the NNI was already aware of possession of assault rifles by Győrkös when it ordered the house search. Thus it had to inform the TEK under the 295/2010. (XII. 22.) government regulation, but failed to do so. The website also reported that the injured Pálvölgyi, who did not die immediately, was inaccessible within the house for half an hour, despite the fact that dozens of police officers arrived at the scene just after the shooting. On 7 November, Heti Világgazdaság shared further details from police sources. It claimed the search team consisted of four detectives and three demolition experts, not only Pálvölgyi and his colleague. According to the HVG's information, Győrkös did not shoot immediately, there was a verbal dispute between the policemen and him, and Győrkös even secluded his watch dog. Then the discussion escalated and Győrkös opened fire in unexplained circumstances.

István Győrkös' two surviving sons (Csaba, their younger brother, died in 2013, and according to reports, Győrkös was unable to process his death) were interviewed by blog Pesti Srácok. Kolos Győrkös expressed his condolences to Pálvölgyi's family, but also added that his father was already wounded when he returned fire and killed the police officer. According to him, Pálvölgyi and his partner burst into the hall and immediately fired, when Győrkös' wife opened the front door upon their request. István, Jr., who acted as deputy leader of the MNA since 29 September 2012, denied the existence of training camps and claimed the MNA had abolished them "years ago". On 10 November, István Jr. blamed the police for the death of Pálvölgyi, which was the result of an "unprofessional police action" and found the date of the search as "suspicious" and "politically motivated".

Győrkös refused to testify on 9 November. His lawyer, György Léhner insisted that his client bought the Kalashnikov rifle ten years ago after receiving a death threat.

==== Political reactions and aftermath ====
Prime Minister Viktor Orbán and his party Fidesz sent their condolences to the family of the victim in a statement. Orbán said "it is unacceptable that anyone should attack those who uphold order and lawfulness". Minister of Interior Sándor Pintér declared Pálvölgyi, who had been serving as a police officer for 25 years, as "hero", and also posthumously promoted him to lieutenant colonel. The coalition partner Christian Democratic People's Party (KDNP) expressed there is "need to fight against such dangerous extremism with any possible methods". Zsolt Molnár, the Socialist Chairman of the Parliamentary Committee on National Security convened the committee to investigate the question of adequate action by the law enforcement and discuss indispensable steps to prevent members of "far-right paramilitary groups" from obtaining guns, while the Democratic Coalition called the crime as an "act of terror" and added, the real threat to the Hungarian security comes from the extreme right groups, and not the migrants, as the Fidesz government campaigned in the 2016 migrant quota referendum. The party also criticized the "incompetence" of Counter Terrorism Centre (TEK). The far-right Jobbik also condemned the murder and rejected suggestions which linked connection between the party and Győrkös' MNA. The rival Pax Hungarica Movement (PHM) wrote that "a myth is broken", and Győrkös turned to "real amuck" after years of "ideological amuck". With his crime act, Győrkös caused severe damage to the Hungarist movement and ideology, they argued.

Following the murder, the MNA's links with the Russian intelligence were revealed, albeit Political Capital already wrote about this close relationship in August 2014, but with limited attention in accordance with the MNA's marginalization. On 2 November, Népszava published a photo where Jobbik MP and foreign policy expert Márton Gyöngyösi and Gábor Szalai, a journalist of the Hídfő.ru and a former member of the MNA, breakfasted together and discussed in a café. Gyöngyösi was interviewed by Index.hu, where he denied any relationship with the MNA. According to him, the photo have been made only by secret service background. On 5 November, Fidesz-backed 888.hu published a photo, where Jobbik leader Gábor Vona and István Győrkös, Jr. together were present on the occasion of Nowruz at the Iranian Embassy in Budapest. The website considered the photo as proof for the existing relationship between Jobbik and the Russian intelligence via the MNA. In response, Jobbik identified nine Fidesz MPs too who participated in that event to demonstrate "unfounded and absurd accusations by the Fidesz-backed media".

On 7 November, the Parliamentary Committee on National Security held its private meeting, inter alia, on the subject of Győrkös. After the meeting, Zsolt Molnár said Pálvölgyi was killed as a result of "professional misconduct". He confirmed that information which suggested the MNA sought to establish a relationship with the Russian intelligence. Molnár added the murder had no ideological motivation, Győrkös killed the police officer in "impaired consciousness". Fidesz MP and deputy chairman of the committee Szilárd Németh urged authorities to investigate the "linkage between far-right paramilitary groups and the foreign [Russia] and domestic politics [Jobbik]."

==== Trial ====
Győrkös' trial for murder, violence against an official person and keeping a firearm without permission began on 25 April 2018 in Szombathely. Győrkös was arraigned and pleaded not guilty to the murder of Pálvölgyi, but he admitted the illegal possession of weapons.

Győrkös was sentenced to life imprisonment - which would mean only after 25 years the conditional release may be discussed - for murder by the court of first instance at Szombathely on 21 June 2019. An appeal court in Győr handed a life sentence to Győrkös for murdering a police officer on 11 December 2019. He was also found guilty of illegal use of a firearm.

== Sources ==
- Boross, Zsigmond Attila (2018). "Győrkös István mint a rendvédelem folyamatos célszemélye". Belügyi Szemle. 66 (6): 108–118. doi:10.38146/BSZ.2018.6.7.
