= Bela Ewald Althans =

German neo-Nazi (born 1966)

- Born: 23 March 1966 (age 60); Bremen, Germany
- Other name: Bernd Althans
- Known for: Neo-Nazism

Bela Ewald Althans (born 23 March 1966) is a German former neo-Nazi. Once the leading organiser in Germany's neo-Nazi underground, Althans left the movement following his imprisonment in the 1990s, and is no longer involved in politics.

== Early life ==
Althans was born on 23 March 1966 into a middle-class family in Bremen where he was taught to reject Nazism but nonetheless became involved in neo-Nazi groups from the age of thirteen. Althans became a follower of Michael Kühnen and led the Hanover branch Action Front of National Socialists/National Activists until it was banned in 1983. He was also a member of the Neo-Nazi organization Wiking-Jugend. Following Kühnen's imprisonment, by which time Althans had been thrown out of the family home by his parents and also his school, Althans went to live with Otto Ernst Remer in Bad Kissingen. Remer made Althans the youth leader of the Freedom Movement, a group that Remer had founded, and taught him about organising cell-based movements as well as introducing him to a number of leading figures of neo-Nazism internationally.

== Neo-Nazism ==
=== Leading role ===
On 20 April 1990, Althans organised a Holocaust denial conclave in the Löwenbräukeller in Munich at which the guest of honour was David Irving. The evening consisted of both speeches and performances mocking the Holocaust. By this time Althans had broken from Remer, leading to personal bitterness between the two, and he sought to develop his own profile internationally, working closely with Yvan Blot in France and CEDADE in Spain. Within Germany Althans, working with Christian Worch, sought to expand neo-Nazi operations be it through working in secret with less underground groups that officially disavowed Nazism like the National Democratic Party of Germany and the German People's Union, reuniting the pro- and anti-Kühnen factions after his death, or building stronger organisational bases in the former East Germany. Althans also allied himself to the Institute for Historical Review and attended a number of their conferences.

In the early 1990s, Althans emerged as a press representative for German neo-Nazism, taking advantage of his rhetoric, which allowed him to seem sophisticated, his imposing personal appearance (6 feet, 4 inches tall) and his fluency in French and English. At the time, he had his own office in a high-end district of Munich with a picture of Adolf Hitler displayed in the window. Althans used computers to organise hate group events disguised as protests, with one example being the Rostock-Lichtenhagen riots, which were violent and xenophobic riots. They were the worst mob attacks against migrants in postwar Germany, although no one was killed. Stones and petrol bombs were thrown at an apartment block where refugees lived.

=== International links ===
In 1988, Althans spent several months in the United States, where he worked closely with Tom Metzger, appearing on his radio show, where they discussed their mutual admiration for the antisemitism of Nation of Islam leader Louis Farrakhan.

Althans began to look for new allies in Eastern Europe and spoke at events for the veterans of the 14th Waffen Grenadier Division of the SS (1st Ukrainian) in Ukraine in 1993, whilst also making trips to Russia to open contact with Russian National Unity leader Alexander Barkashov. Althans' journeys were mostly funded by Holocaust denier Ernst Zündel and the two went to Russia together in August 1994 where relations with Barkashov and other far right leaders were cemented. The pair also met Vladimir Zhirinovsky, although Althans was unimpressed with the Liberal Democratic Party of Russia leader, suggesting that Zhirinovsky's anti-Semitism was merely opportunistic rather than ideological like his own. Althans later said that Zündel was paying him 16,000 Deutsch Marks a month: "I was suddenly rich. Before that I had nothing. Now I had everything. It was a great job for a provocateur."

Althans and Zündel was interviewed and their activism and daily private lives documented on the depth by Swedish Television SVT in one show of the investigative documentary program Dokument utifrån, episode Yrke Nynazist ("Occupation: Neonazi") which aired on 20 August 1994 and caused some controversy in both Sweden and some cities in Germany that refused to show it since it contains scenes where Althans and Zündel promote Nazism openly without interruptions or counter-comments. In the documentary, Althans also publicly shows support for the Croatian Ustaša movement.

=== Imprisonment ===
In December 1994, Althans was imprisoned for distributing a video that denied the Holocaust and, whilst still in jail, faced further charges relating to disrespectful comments he made in a documentary about him, Beruf Neonazi, claiming that Auschwitz concentration camp was little more than a holiday resort, despite how horrific it was in reality. During the trial Althans attempted to defend himself by claiming that he had renounced neo-Nazism and had been an agent for the Verfassungsschutz since 1991—Althans later said: "It was a rumour placed in [a weekly news magazine] by a friend. It was meant to help me. But it wasn't true and the judge was too clever for that. He saw through it"—whilst also getting witnesses to testify that he was bisexual.

On 10 July 1995, Der Spiegel reported that Althans had been working for the Bavarian Intelligence agency, until the collaboration had been terminated by the agency because of "lack of truthfulness of reports". During the Althans trial at Berlin Regional Court, Bavarian intelligence chief Gerhard Forster on 1 August 1995 denied Der Spiegel's allegations, but admitted to two meetings of intelligence officials with Althans in 1994. During a first meeting on 23 February 1994, Althans offered "extensive files" on the German neofascist scene for a sum of DEM 360,000. During a second meeting on 10 March 1994, this offer was rejected by the intelligence officials.

Ultimately his defence failed and he had an additional 3 1/2-years added to the sentence he was already serving.

== Personal life ==
Althans first publicly acknowledged his homosexuality in the magazine DON & ADONIS in 1993. After his imprisonment, Althans married his Taiwanese boyfriend and left the neo-Nazi movement, living under a new identity in Belgium. He subsequently gave his private papers from his neo-Nazi days to the International Institute of Social History in Amsterdam. Althans also participated in the 2005 documentary Men, Heroes and Gay Nazis. At the time of a January 2022 interview with Jay Rayner for the London Observer, he was living in Berlin and active in the gay scene. Althans said his journey away from the far right "wasn't some sudden change. It was over time... I am a provocateur, always have been".

== Bibliography ==
- Martin A. Lee, The Beast Reawakens, Warner Books, 1997
