= Thomas Lemke =

Thomas Lemke may refer to:

- Thomas Lemke (sociologist)
- Thomas Lemke (serial killer)
