= Gottfried Küssel =

Austrian far-right political activist (born 1958)

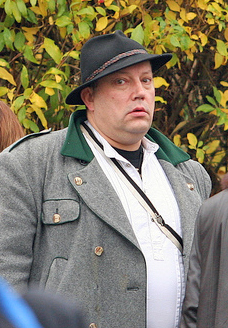
- Küssel in 2008
- Born: Gottfried Küssel; 10 September 1958 (age 67); Vienna, Austria
- Years active: 1976–present
- Organization(s): Volkstreue außerparlamentarische Opposition; Gesinnungsgemeinschaft der Neuen Front
- Known for: Neo-Nazi activist
- Criminal charge: Reviving Nazism
- Criminal penalty: Ten years' imprisonment
- Criminal status: Released in 1999, re-imprisoned in 2013

Gottfried Küssel (born 10 September 1958) is an Austrian far-right political activist who also gained some notoriety in Germany. He has been a leading figure in neo-Nazism and Holocaust denial since the 1970s.

== Early years ==
Born in Vienna, Küssel first became involved in politics in 1976 when he became a member of Aktion Neue Rechte, a German New Right organisation, and by his admission joined the NSDAP/AO the following year. He was also a member of the neo-Nazi Kameradschaft Babenberg from 1979 until it was outlawed in April 1980 and around this time also edited the far-right magazine Halt.

== Activism in Austria ==
In the early 1980s Küssel undertook much work amongst football supporters, especially those of Rapid Vienna, aimed at recruiting them to the far right, in particular the Volksbewegung, which he joined in 1982. He was arrested in 1983 and imprisoned on charges of attempting to revive Nazism. Released in 1984, Küssel was involved in a number of minor groups, notably the Nationalen Front and Volkssozialistischen Partei, until in 1986 he established his own extremist movement, the Volkstreue außerparlamentarische Opposition (VAPO). A pamphlet that Küssel produced under the VAPO banner outlining his belief that Anne Frank's The Diary of a Young Girl was a forgery brought him to the attention of neo-Nazis in Germany and in 1987, at a gathering in Frankfurt he was recognised by his German counterparts as Bereichsleiter Ostmark, or leader in Ostmark.

VAPO took part in public rallies in Austria whilst also drilling members in military exercises whilst Küssel himself was interviewed on Zick-Zack, a youth programme on ORF, during which he was identified as a neo-Nazi. He also sought to improve his international contacts, holding meetings with the likes of Gary Lauck and Michael Kühnen, and in 1992 attending a conference of historical revisionists in Munich at which the likes of David Irving, Fred Leuchter, Mark Weber and Udo Walendy were leading speakers.

== Cross-border leadership ==
Following the death of Michael Kühnen in 1991 Küssel joined Christian Worch and Arnulf Priem in taking control of Kühnen's final group, the Gesinnungsgemeinschaft der Neuen Front (GdNF). In this role he continued to be a public face of neo-Nazism whilst also organising military training for both Austrian and German activists. Having taken over as sole leader of the German Alternative he pushed that movement, which had publicly maintained a legal façade unlike the more openly militant GdNF, along a more openly violent path, resulting in it being banned in 1992. Küssel would claim that Kühnen had named him his successor on his deathbed. His public engagements included a controversial appearance on the American new programme Nightline during which he called Adolf Hitler the greatest man in German history and publicly denied the Holocaust, as well as an interview for Tele 5 in which he called for the re-registration of the Nazi Party as a legal political party. According to Ingo Hasselbach Küssel would also regularly lead his supporters in attacks on refugee centres whilst four of those detained after a letter bomb attack on such an establishment in Vienna in January 1992 were high-profile VAPO members or supporters (although Küssel himself was not arrested in connection with this incident). Küssel had played a leading role in helping to establish neo-Nazi cells in the former East Germany in the immediate aftermath of German reunification.

== Imprisonment ==
In 1992, along with his ally Klaus Kopanski, Küssel was arrested at his Vienna apartment and charged again with Nazi revivalism. Found guilty the following year by the Regional Court in Vienna, he was sentenced to ten years' imprisonment. During his absence Austrian neo-Nazism was led by his allies Gerhard Endres in Vienna and Jürgen Lipthay in Salzburg. Küssel's imprisonment was followed by a number of bombings carried out by neo-Nazi militants using home-made bombs as a protest against the sentence. He was released from prison in 1999, receiving an early release for good behaviour.

== Subsequent activity ==
Although no longer in an official leadership position, Küssel has continued to be a prominent figure on the far right and has been a regular speaker at a number of neo-Nazi events, often alongside his long-term collaborator Hans Jörg Schimanek Jr.. In February 2005 he was fined €360 for possessing illegal weapons after he was found to own a number of daggers and bayonets, which contravened a weapons ban placed on him in 1982. He was arrested again in 2010 after giving the Hitler salute in a Vienna bar and attacking its Venezuelan-born female owner with an umbrella.

In 2011 he was arrested in connection with investigations into Alpen-Donau.info, an Austrian neo-Nazi blog and website and on 12 December that same year he was publicly indicted for his involvement in the initiative. The trial was due to get underway in May 2012 but was twice delayed due to concerns over the jury.

When the trial finally got under way Küssel was found guilty of breaching the Verbotsgesetz 1947, which bans any attempt to revive Nazism. Presiding Judge Martina Krainz noted the importance of the internet in disseminating extremist information and due to this, as well as Küssel's status as "a leading figure in the extreme-right scene" with several earlier convictions, she sentenced him to nine years' imprisonment.
