= Men, Heroes and Gay Nazis =

- German: Männer, Helden, schwule Nazis
- Directed by: Rosa von Praunheim
- Screenplay by: Rosa von Praunheim
- Produced by: Rosa von Praunheim
- Starring: Rainer Fromm; Winfried Bonengel; Michael Kühnen; Bernd-Ulrich Hergemöller; Jörg Fischer; Bela Ewald Althans; Rüdiger Lautmann
- Cinematography: Lorenz Haarmann
- Edited by: Stefan Kobe
- Release date: 16 February 2005
- Running time: 90 minutes
- Country: Germany
- Language: German

Men, Heroes and Gay Nazis (German: Männer, Helden, schwule Nazis) is a 2005 German documentary film directed, written and produced by Rosa von Praunheim. The film focuses on gay men who align themselves with hardcore authoritarian views, white power skinheads, and Nazis.

Rosa von Praunheim stated of the subjects featured in the documentary, "Some may be shocked that I do not take a stand in my film and do not portray gay neo-Nazis as monsters, but as people living their lives in dramatic contradiction."

== Plot ==
During a gay march in Berlin, some of the men in the crowd are asked their opinion about gay men who have extreme right-wing views or who are white power skinheads or neo-Nazis. All of those questioned express their disapproval. One of them comments the absurdity of the situation: had the gay far right and neo-Nazis lived in the era they admire, they would have been exterminated.

Four gay men in present-day Germany who are, or have been, engaged in right-wing political parties are interviewed: Andre, a skinhead; Bela Ewald Althans, a former prominent neo-Nazi leader; Alexander Schlesinger, who is involved in right wing politics and Jörg Fischer, a right wing theorist.

Andre is a skinhead who defines violence as to have the courage to defend himself and as part of the expression of the warrior within. Openly gay, he is tolerated by his fellow skinheads but admits that he is in constant threat. Eventually, he moves away from the skinheads movement to conservative politics.

Bela Ewald Althans, who now works in advertising, was in the early 1990s one of Germany most prominent neo-Nazi, an Adolf Hitler admirer and Holocaust denier. In 1994, he was arrested and spent 21 months in jail for denying the Holocaust in front of astonished tourists during a visit to Auschwitz concentration camp while he was filmed in Profession: Neonazi (Beruf Neonazi), a documentary about him. Althans is now involved in the gay community, but he does not regret his past. He tells that he did not become gay from one day to the other, but evolved in his feelings and attractions until he discovered his true self.

Alexander Schlesinger, who came from East Germany, is a member of a political party representing extreme right-wing views. Schlesinger claims that being gay does not make a person better: a gay can be racist. About what he finds appealing, he comments: "We gay men are drawn toward a masculine ideal. I can't stand a screaming queen".

For nine years, Jörg Fischer was an active member of the extreme right-wing parties NPD and DVU. During that time he had a relationship with another male party member. Although they had sex many times a week for four years, they never talked about sex or mentioned the word gay. Fischer left those organizations in 1991, rejecting their anti-immigrant and anti-gay policies. He found a different romantic male partner and now works in social issues.

The testimonies of the four men are intertwined with interviews by historians, journalists and intellectuals who have followed the links between fascism and homosexuality through recent German history. The life of famed neo-Nazi Michael Kühnen is recounted. Considered the Führer by his followers, he kept his homosexuality secret until 1981 when Johannes Bugner, a young gay neo-Nazi, was stabbed to death in Hamburg for his sexual orientation. Kühnen disengaged himself from the killers, considering Bugner a martyr of the movement and came out as gay in his booklet National Socialism and homosexuality, writing that gay men make better fighters, because, having no family, they are closer to their comrades. Kühnen, ostracized by his former supporters, died of AIDS in 1991.

There have always been extreme right-wing homosexuals, the documentary explains, even in Nazi Germany. Rudolf Hess had no interest in women, wrote love letters and poems to men in his youth and married only on Hitler's advise. Ernst Röhm, co-founder of the Sturmabteilung (SA, "Storm Battalion"), the Nazi Party militia, was a close friend of Hitler beginning in 1919, and was the only one allowed to address Hitler by his first name, Adolf. Hitler knew about Röhm's homosexuality and particular weakness for young soldiers but turned a blind eye as he counted on Röhm's violent trooper paramilitary Brownshirts during his ascending to power. During the purge of the Nazi party known as Night of the Long Knives (1934) Hitler had Röhm arrested and killed shortly after in prison. Edmund Heines, Röhm's deputy in the SA, was another gay Nazi leader. He set up his own special concentration camp near Breslau so he could torture and kill victims for pleasure. Theories on Hitler's own sexuality are also briefly examined. Lothar Machtan in his book Hitler's Secret: The double life of a dictator (Hitlers Geheimnis: Das Doppelleben eines Diktators) questions Hitler's sexuality.

During the Nazi regime between 5 and 15 thousand gay men were killed in concentration camps. Pierre Seel, a gay Holocaust survivor, appears briefly recounting how a young friend was eaten alive by the dogs of Schirmeck-Vorbruck concentration camp.

== Home media ==
Men Heroes and Gay Nazis! was released on Region 2 DVD in German with English subtitles as a part of a box set of von Praunheim's films.

== See also ==
- Gay Nazi Party
- Gay skinheads
