= Gary Lauck =

American neo-Nazi and publisher

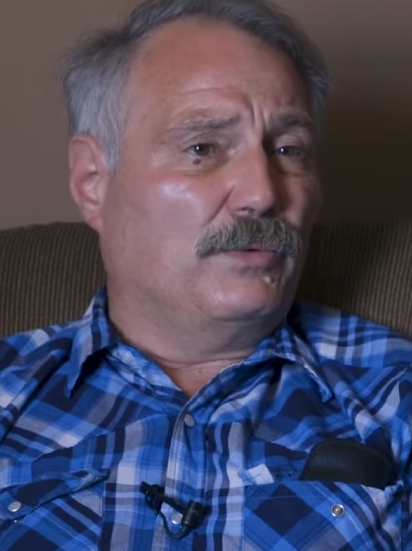
- Lauck in 2018
- Born: Gerhard Rex Lauck; May 12, 1953 (age 73); Milwaukee, Wisconsin
- Occupations: Political activist, publisher
- Years active: 1970s-present
- Known for: NSDAP/AO

Gerhard Rex Lauck (born May 12, 1953) is an American neo-Nazi activist and publisher. Based in Lincoln, Nebraska, he is sometimes referred to as the "Farm Belt Führer" due to his perceived rural origins. He was arrested in Denmark in 1995, extradited to Germany, and convicted in 1996. He served four years in prison.

== Early life ==
Gary Lauck was born in Milwaukee, Wisconsin, on May 12, 1953, to a German-American family. At age 11 his family moved to Lincoln, Nebraska, where his father became a professor of engineering at the University of Nebraska. Lauck skipped his senior year of high school and attended the University of Nebraska for two years. By this time, he had already adopted neo-Nazi beliefs.

== Neo-Nazism ==
During his early years, Lauck was a member of the National Socialist White People's Party and, later, of the National Socialist Party of America (NSPA), which was based in Chicago and led by Frank Collin. Subsequently, he left the group following the revelation of Collin’s Jewish background and the fact that he was a child molester. In 1978, Lauck shot and wounded his brother Jerry following a political dispute. He eventually moved to Chicago, where he spent most of his adult life.

As the leader of the NSDAP/AO, Lauck maintained close contact with like-minded individuals and groups in Europe, including Michael Kühnen, with whom he collaborated closely from the 1970s. His connections to leaders and members of the German neo-Nazi scene date back to 1971 when, at just 18 years old, Lauck established the Auslandsorganisation (Overseas Organization) of the National Socialist Combat Groups. This militant German neo-Nazi group was swiftly banned by the West German government, leading to the formation of Lauck's NSDAP/AO.

A noted Germanophile, Lauck sported a toothbrush moustache and regularly used the Nazi salute as his greeting. His speech impediment has often been mistaken for an affected German accent. Although based in the United States, Lauck spent much of his time as an activist in Europe, particularly in the early 1990s, when the NSDAP/AO significantly expanded its network of contacts. He published large volumes of neo-Nazi literature in several languages and distributed computer disks containing detailed bomb-making instructions through a network of European collaborators.

In 1990, Lauck facilitated a partnership between the NSDAP/AO and the Swedish neo-Nazi group Sveriges Nationella Förbund, which played a key role in forming the "Nordic National Socialist Bloc" alongside activists in Norway. That same year, he played a pivotal role in assisting Kühnen, Gottfried Küssel, and Christian Worch in establishing a network of Gesinnungsgemeinschaft der Neuen Front cells across the former East Germany after German reunification.

Two years later, the NSDAP/AO reached an agreement with the National Socialist Movement of Denmark, which had previously been a prominent member of the rival World Union of National Socialists (WUNS). This shift followed the expulsion of Povl Riis-Knudsen, a leading figure in WUNS, from the Danish Nazi movement after he married a Palestinian woman.

During the early days of the Yugoslav Wars, Lauck's journal New Order published a series of articles supporting Croatia, with particular sympathy expressed for the Ustaše. The magazine played a significant role in recruiting neo-Nazi-linked mercenaries to fight for the Croatian cause.

In 1995, Lauck was arrested in Denmark, sparking a far-right campaign in the United States opposing his extradition to Germany, where he was wanted for distributing neo-Nazi propaganda. Despite these efforts, Lauck was deported to Hamburg, where he was tried and convicted of disseminating neo-Nazi pamphlets. He was sentenced to four years in prison.

Lauck’s sentence ended on March 19, 1999, and he was deported to the United States, leaving Germany on March 23. He now operates Third Reich Books, which continues to distribute Nazi paraphernalia online.

== Publications ==
- Blood and Soul (Westropa Social Alliance Publications, 1972).
- Power Struggle: Today for the Movement, Tomorrow for the World (White Power Publications, 1976).
- An Introduction to the NSDAP/AO: The Fight Goes On! (NSDAP/AO, 2000).
- The Education of an Evil Genius (RJG Enterprises Inc., 2014), ISBN 978-1-63173-772-5.
- Project Harmony: Human and Artificial Intelligence (Author Path Publishers, 2026), ISBN 9798951062543.
