= Siegfried Borchardt =

German neo-Nazi (1953–2021)

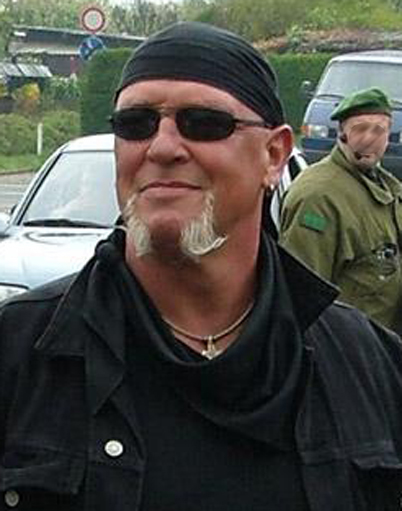
Borchardt in 2005

Roland Siegfried Borchardt (known as SS-Siggi; 14 November 1953 – 3 October 2021) was a German neo-Nazi of the Free fellowship and a former functionary of the Free German Workers' Party, which was banned in 1995. In the 2014 local elections, he won a seat on the city council of the city of Dortmund, as the party's leading candidate, but resigned after two months.

== Biography ==
Borchardt was a trained industrial salesman and was initially an apolitical youth who spent his spare time as a spectator in football stadiums. Then there followed a period of unemployment and involvement in the hooligan scene, where he made contact with Michael Bold.

In 1982, Borchardt founded the Dortmund Football Fan Club Borussenfront, which drifted gradually into the right-wing extremist scene. The preferred field of action of Borchardt's Borussia Dortmund front was north around the Borsigplatz, where there were riots regularly. Foreigners were chased down through the neighborhood. From this time his nickname changed from Siggi Borsigplatz to SS Siggi. In an interview in 2014, Borchardt told a journalist that he was not satisfied with the nickname SS Siggi, he would prefer to be called SA-Siggi.

Parallel to his activities at Borussenfront, Borchardt served as camaraderie leader of the Action Front of National Socialists/National Activists and later as a district leader of the committee in preparation for the celebrations marking the 100th birthday of Adolf Hitler AH). From 1984 onward he built, together with other ANS / NA activists, the National Association North Rhine-Westphalia of the Freedom German Workers' Party (FAP). He ran for office in the local elections of the FAP in 1984 and became its leading candidate for the state election in 1985. In 1988 Borchardt became the Regional Chairman, North Rhine-Westphalia, and Deputy National Chairman of the FAP. He was a candidate for the FAP in the 1989 election to the European Parliament. The Borussenfront, which also consisted of FAP members, organised events protection of NPD, distributed propaganda material and was responsible for violence against dissidents and foreigners.

In the 1980s, Borchardt was convicted of various offenses. He was on remand from August 1985 due to several incidents, including attacks on counter-demonstrators on 28 April 1984 in Drabenderhöhe / Wiehl and Bonner Punk on 1 September 1984. He was convicted on 22 July 1986 before the District Court in Bonn for aggravated breach of the peace and aggravated assault and was sentenced to a total of two years and six months imprisonment. Since the time on remand was credited, he was released from prison in early 1987. There were other convictions and prison sentences between 1989 and 1992.

After the banning of the FAP in 1995, Borchardt organized the "camaraderie Dortmund", which supports regular demonstrations of the neo-Nazi Christian Worch. In 2001 he was convicted again for offences including bodily injury. Borchardt was regarded as the head of the Dortmund neo-Nazi scene and was still active in the "resistance West". On 27 January 2005 he took part as a speaker at an openly presented neo-Nazi meeting in the Netherlands which included organisations banned in Germany (Blood and Honour, Racial Volunteer Force). In 2011 the information portal Looking Law reported on activities of the "remnants of the former Borussenfront" under Borchardt.

The end of 2012 Borchardt gave up his reluctance to public political activity. On 27 October 2012, he was appointed chairman of the newly formed district in the Dortmund district association of the party Die Rechte, the right. Since then he has led the organization, which is seen as a replacement for the banned National Resistance Dortmund.

In the local elections on 25 May 2014 Borchardt won a seat on the city council of Dortmund. Two months later he informed the mayor of Dortmund Ullrich Sierau that he was to resign his council seat effective 31 July 2014. Borchardt cited health and temporal reasons for this decision. He would continue to exercise his mandate as a member of the district council Downtown North. For him, Dennis Giemsch moved up, who was previously the National Resistance prohibited camaraderie Dortmund (NWDO).

According to estimates by the political scientist and constitutional protector Thomas Grumke, Borchardt still must be considered as Veteran of the West German right, but failed due to a variety of criminal and prison sentences, which restricted its activities considerably, and therefore could not develop additional significant impact on North Rhine-Westphalia party.
