= HDJ =

HDJ may refer to:

- Heimattreue Deutsche Jugend, successor party of Wiking-Jugend, German neo-Nazi party
- HDJ, initialism for Harry D. Jacobs High School, United States
- HDJ Platform, Toyota model code for a series of engines
- HDJ, division code for Huadian, Jilin, China
- HDJ International, team at the 1988 British motorcycle Grand Prix
