= Pax Hungarica Movement =

Pax Hungarica Movement Pax Hungarica Mozgalom
- Leader: Endre János Domokos
- Founded: 26 January 2008
- Dissolved: 31 July 2017
- Ideology: Hungarism; Neo-Nazism
- Political position: Far-right

The Pax Hungarica Movement (Hungarian: Pax Hungarica Mozgalom; PHM) was a far-right Hungarist and neo-Nazi movement, founded on 26 January 2008 to represent an alternative against the Hungarian National Front (MNA). Its predecessor organization was the Blood and Honour Cultural Association.

The leadership of the organization decided to abolish the movement on 31 July 2017 due to large-scale withdrawal of members in the previous years.

János Lantos, a leading figure in the Force and Determination neo-Nazi political movement was a member of the Pax Hungarica Movement.
