= Torsten Voigt =

German sociologist

Torsten H. Voigt
- Born: 13 October 1979 (age 46); Berlin, Germany
- Other name: Torsten Heinemann
- Education: Goethe University Frankfurt (MA, 2005; PhD, 2010)
- Scientific career
- Fields: Sociology; Science and Technology Studies
- Workplaces: RWTH Aachen University; University of Hamburg; UC Berkeley; Humboldt University of Berlin; Goethe University Frankfurt

Torsten Henri Voigt (né Heinemann; born 13 October 1979, in Berlin) is a German sociologist, who is dean of the Faculty of Arts and Humanities at RWTH Aachen University.

== Early life and education ==
Torsten Henri Heinemann was born 13 October 1979, in Berlin.

He attended Goethe University Frankfurt, where he studied sociology, political sciences, psychology, and philosophy. In 2005, he received his Diplom (equivalent to a Master of Arts) in sociology. In 2010, he subsequently received a Doctor of Philosophy in sociology with a thesis on the popularity of neuroscience in contemporary society. His thesis was published as a book in the German language and was shortlisted for Opus Primum, a price of the best scientific book by an early career researcher.

== Career ==
In 2014, Voigt was appointed Professor of Sociology at University of Hamburg. He then spent three years as a Marie Curie fellow at the Institute for the Study of Societal Issues at the University of California, Berkeley. Since 2018, he has been a professor of sociology at RWTH Aachen University.

Torsten Voigt closely collaborated with Thomas Lemke on various projects and was the principal investigator a large scale international project on the use of DNA testing in immigration procedures.

== Work ==
Voigt's research encompasses a variety of areas in the field of sociology and science and technology studies, including the societal implications of biotechnologies, the intersection of neuroscience and society, and the ethical dimensions of genomic data sharing. Notably, he has explored the use of DNA analysis in immigration policies, examining how genetic testing influences family reunification processes.

Among his publications is the monograph "Populäre Wissenschaft: Hirnforschung zwischen Labor und Talkshow" (2012), which delves into the popularization of neuroscience and its societal impacts. Additionally, he co-edited "Suspect Families: DNA Analysis, Family Reunification and Immigration Policies" (2015), providing "the first comprehensive book about genetic kinship testing in the field of immigration".

He has also done extensive research in the field of medical sociology, most notably mental disorders. He traced the history of burnout and it's ambiguous status as a mental disorder and conducts studies on psychedelic assisted therapy.

== Publications (selection) ==
=== Monographs ===
- Heinemann, Torsten. 2012. Populäre Wissenschaft: Hirnforschung zwischen Labor und Talkshow. Göttingen: Wallstein Verlag. ISBN 978-3-8353-1073-5

=== Edited volumes ===
- Heinemann, Torsten, Ilpo Helén, Thomas Lemke, Ursula Naue, and Martin G. Weiss (2015). Suspect Families: DNA Analysis, Family Reunification and Immigration Policies. Farnham and Burlington, VT: Ashgate

=== Journal articles ===
- Voigt, Torsten; Holtz, Verena; Niemiec, Emilia; Howard, Heidi C.; Middleton, Anna; Prainsack, Barbara (2020). "Willingness to donate genomic and other medical data: Results from Germany". European Journal of Human Genetics. 28 (8). Nature: 1000–1009. doi:10.1038/s41431-020-0611-2. PMC 7381614. PMID 32238912.
- Paul, Bettina; Fischer, Larissa; Voigt, Torsten H. (2020). "Anachronistic Progress? User Notions of Lie Detection in the Juridical Field". Engaging Science, Technology, and Society. 6: 328–346. doi:10.17351/ests2020.433.
- Lee, Catherine; Voigt, Torsten H. (2020). "DNA Testing for Family Reunification and the Limits of Biological Truth". Science, Technology, and Human Values. 45 (3): 430–454. doi:10.1177/0162243919862870.
- Heinemann, Linda V.; Heinemann, Torsten (2017). "Burnout Research: Emergence and Scientific Investigation of a Contested Diagnosis". SAGE Open. 7 (1). doi:10.1177/2158244017697154.
- Heinemann, Torsten; Lemke, Thomas (2012). "Suspect Families: DNA Kinship Testing in German Immigration Policy". Sociology. 47 (4): 810. doi:10.1177/0038038512454352.
