= Gesinnungsgemeinschaft der Neuen Front =

German neo-Nazi group

Gesinnungsgemeinschaft der Neuen Front (GdNF) is a German organisation that was one of the main groups for neo-Nazi activity during the 1990s. It translates into English as the Community of Like-Minded People of the New Front or the Covenant of the New Front.

The GdNF was formed in 1985 by Michael Kühnen, Thomas Brehl and Christian Worch after the banning of the Action Front of National Socialists/National Activists. Initially a loose group associated with the magazine Die Neue Front, the GdNF was soon formalised into an organisation, taking in most of the membership of the ANS/NA. The group placed itself within the more radical Sturmabteilung tradition of Nazism rather than simple devotion to Adolf Hitler. It also placed importance on opposing the influence of the United States, the destruction of the environment and the weakening of German racial purity. The group was also active in Austria, which it referred to as "Ostmark", and called for the formation of an Austrian SA in a December 1990 edition of its paper Neuen Front.

When Kühnen came out as a homosexual in 1986 the GdNF remained loyal to him in the resulting split, although the group lost control of the Free German Workers' Party. However the group continued to improve its organisational basis despite this set-back, staging marches, paramilitary training and setting up cells in the German Democratic Republic. It also sought to build up a portfolio of international contacts with which it co-operated on military drilling, propaganda dissemination and arms dispersal.

After the death of Kühnen in 1991, the leadership of the GdNF, which had about 400 fully active members, passed to Worch, Winfried Arnulf Priem and Austrian neo-Nazi leader Gottfried Küssel. In Austria the GdNF worked in tandem with Küssel's Volkstreue Außerparlamentarische Opposition (VAPO), a like-minded group. However without Kühnen the group went into terminal decline and became lost in a sea of similar groups that were formed in the 1990s due to ever closer government scrutiny of neo-Nazi activities. The group continued to publish Neuen Front although increasingly this became an international magazine of neo-Nazism with close links to the NSDAP/AO with the GdNF doing little beyond publishing this work. With Worch jailed in 1996 and other important figures such as Thomas Brehl starting up their own groups the GdNF gradually passed out of existence.
