= Christian Worch =

German neo-Nazi

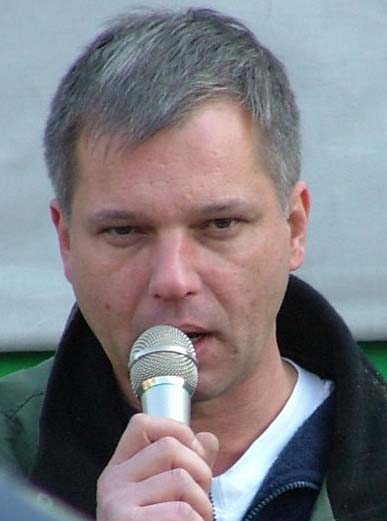
- Worch in 2003

Chairman of The Right
- In office 27 May 2012 – 18 March 2025
- Preceded by: Position established
- Succeeded by: Position dissolved

Christian Worch (born 14 March 1956) is a prominent German neo-Nazi activist and chairman of the now-defunct far-right political party Die Rechte.

In 1974, Worch started a militant group called the Hansabande in Hamburg, along with Michael Kühnen. The group defaced Jewish graveyards, assaulted leftists and foreigners, and denied the Holocaust. Worch took part in one especially well-known campaign under the motto "I am an ass to believe that Jews were gassed in Germany" (Ich Esel glaube, dass in Deutschland Juden vergast worden sind). The group gradually became the Aktionsfront Nationaler Sozialisten (ANS, Action Front of National Socialists) in 1977. Worch and Kühnen were also close to the now-banned Wiking-Jugend (Viking Youth).

Kühnen was arrested in 1979 and Worch took over leadership of the ANS. In 1980 he was convicted, receiving a three-year prison sentence, despite being defended by Jürgen Rieger during his trial. In 1983, the organization, now known as the ANS/NA (Aktionsfront Nationaler Sozialisten/Nationale Aktivisten, Action Front of National Socialists/National Activists) was banned, so Worch joined the Free German Workers' Party (FAP) and became vice-chairman. As the Nationale Liste (National List) was founded in 1989, he became active in its executive committee. He edited its magazine, Index, until September 1991 and was especially active in anti-Antifa work. In this campaign, lists of names and addresses of left-wing and anti-fascist activists and organizations were published; this led to attacks on some of the people listed. Worch was one of the main initiators of the campaign.

After Kühnen died in 1991, Worch, along with Winfried Arnulf Priem and Gottfried Küssel, took over the Gesinnungsgemeinschaft der Neuen Front (GdNF); this led to him receiving a two-year suspended sentence in 1994. He had to serve this jail time beginning in February 1996 because he continued the ANS/NA despite its having been banned, but he was released early in 1997.

For a short time in the 1990s, Worch had close relations with the National Democratic Party of Germany (NPD) and was a link between neo-Nazi groups and the NPD. In an interview, he defended his collaboration with the party, saying that "the NPD is as a party, of course, only a means to propagate our worldview". However, he has since distanced himself from the party.

Worch also collaborates with Gary Lauck's NSDAP/AO (1972), and is known as one of the main organizers of the Rudolf Hess Memorial March, which takes place once a year in Wunsiedel, Bavaria, where the remains of Rudolf Hess were formerly buried, and is one of the most important events for European neo-Nazis.
