= Acid Dreams (book) =

1986 non-fiction book by Martin A. Lee and Bruce Shlain

Acid Dreams: The Complete Social History of LSD: The CIA, the Sixties, and Beyond
- Cover of the first edition
- Authors: Martin A. Lee; Bruce Shlain
- Original title: Acid Dreams: The CIA, LSD, and the Sixties Rebellion
- Language: English
- Subject: Drug culture
- Published: 1985 Grove Press; 1992 Grove Weidenfeld (revised); 2001 MacMillan UK
- Publication place: United States
- Media type: Print (Hardcover and Paperback)
- Pages: 345
- ISBN: 978-0-8021-3062-4
- OCLC: 25281992

Acid Dreams: The Complete Social History of LSD: the CIA, the Sixties, and Beyond, originally released as Acid Dreams: The CIA, LSD, and the Sixties Rebellion, is a 1985 book by Martin A. Lee and Bruce Shlain, in which the authors document the 40-year social history of lysergic acid diethylamide (LSD), beginning with its synthesis by Albert Hofmann of Sandoz Pharmaceuticals in 1938. During the Cold War period of the early 1950s, LSD was tested as an experimental truth drug for interrogation by the United States intelligence and military community. Psychiatrists also used it to treat depression and schizophrenia. Under the direction of Sidney Gottlieb, the drug was used by the Central Intelligence Agency (CIA) in cooperation with participating "colleges, universities, research foundations, hospitals, clinics, and penal institutions". LSD was tested on "prisoners, mental patients, volunteers, and unsuspecting human subjects".

In the mid to late 1950s, many intellectuals began experimenting with LSD. Alfred Matthew Hubbard introduced Aldous Huxley to the drug in 1955 and Timothy Leary began taking it in 1962. By 1963, LSD had escaped the laboratory and became popular as a legal recreational drug with the emerging counterculture. Lee and Shlain argue that LSD influenced the social movements of the 1960s. The Free Speech Movement began in 1964, followed by the wide availability of street acid in 1965, the birth of the hippie movement in 1966, and the growing antiwar movement associated with the New Left. In response to queries by journalists about a "massive, illegal domestic intelligence operation" by the Nixon Administration, government hearings were held in the 1970s. Investigations by the Rockefeller Commission (1975), the Church Committee (1976), and a release of declassified documents under the Freedom of Information Act in 1977 which led to new Senate hearings that same year, uncovered information about LSD experiments for the first time.

The book is divided into two parts, with the first part of the book based on many of the public hearings, reports, and declassified files. Part one, "The Roots of Psychedelia", discusses the pioneering research by the intelligence, military, scientific, and academic community. Part two, "Acid for the Masses", discusses the hippie movement and the effects of LSD on the counterculture. Since its initial release in 1985, the book has received mostly positive reviews. A revised edition was published by Grove Atlantic in 1992, with a new introduction by essayist Andrei Codrescu.

== Background ==
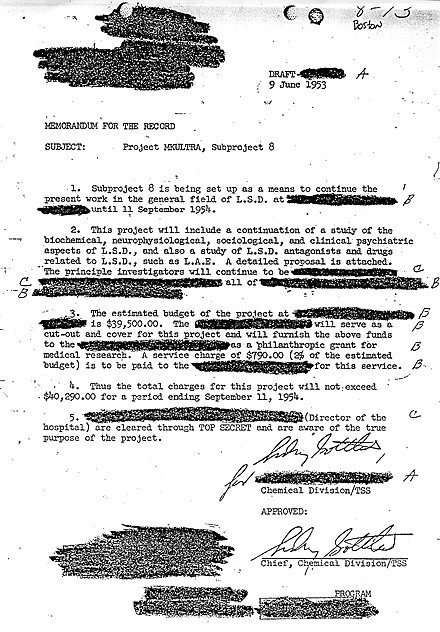
Project MKULTRA, Subproject 8. A letter from Sidney Gottlieb regarding the use of LSD in 1953

Swiss chemist Albert Hofmann first synthesized LSD at Sandoz Laboratories in 1938, while searching for medicinal ergot alkaloid derivatives, but its potential use as a psychedelic was not discovered until 1943. Sandoz made LSD available as a psychiatric drug in 1947. In World War II, under the direction of William J. Donovan, the Office of Strategic Services (OSS) experimented with cannabis as a truth serum but it was a failure. The U.S. Navy became interested in testing mescaline as a truth drug after discovering it was used on prisoners at the Dachau concentration camp. From 1947 to 1953, the navy experimented with testing mescaline and several different drugs on human subjects in Project CHATTER.

In the 1940s, the Central Intelligence Agency (CIA) began experimenting with different techniques for interrogation—one used sedatives to induce a trance state while another used two different drugs, such as an upper and a downer. Director Roscoe H. Hillenkoetter authorized funds for a secret mind control project code named Project BLUEBIRD, which became Project ARTICHOKE in 1951. Project MKULTRA, a covert research operation run by the CIA's Scientific Intelligence Division, began experimenting with human behavioral engineering in 1953. LSD became illegal in 1966. CIA testing of drugs in various forms continued until 1967. LSD was listed as a Schedule I drug in 1970.

In 1974, New York Times journalist Seymour Hersh, going on a government source, accused the Central Intelligence Agency of "directly violating its charter" and conducting "a massive, illegal domestic intelligence operation during the Nixon Administration against the antiwar movement and other dissident groups in the United States". The Rockefeller Commission was formed in 1975 to respond to these accusations. The commission found that the CIA destroyed 152 files documenting LSD testing in 1973 to prevent public knowledge of illegality. After 1975, the media began reporting widely about how the CIA tested LSD as a "mind control weapon".

In 1976, the Church Committee reported that from 1954 to 1963, the CIA "randomly picked up unsuspecting patrons in bars in the United States and slipped LSD into their food and drink." In 1977, a Freedom of Information Act request uncovered a cache of 20,000 documents relating to Project MKULTRA, which led to a subsequent joint hearing by the Senate Select Committee on Intelligence and the Senate Subcommittee on Health and Scientific Research in August 1977.

== Development ==
Investigative journalist Martin A. Lee (1954–) was 14 years old during the height of the countercultural movement of the 1960s; his personal motivation for writing the book was spurred by his attempt to understand himself and the culture he was a part of during this time. His early interest in the Kennedy assassination led him to work with the Assassination Information Bureau, an activist group founded by Carl Oglesby. While the group was pursuing leads on the killings of JFK and Oswald, Lee pursued a different angle involving drug testing and mind control, which eventually led him to research the relationships—but not necessarily any conspiracy—between the CIA, drug testing, and the counterculture of the 1960s.

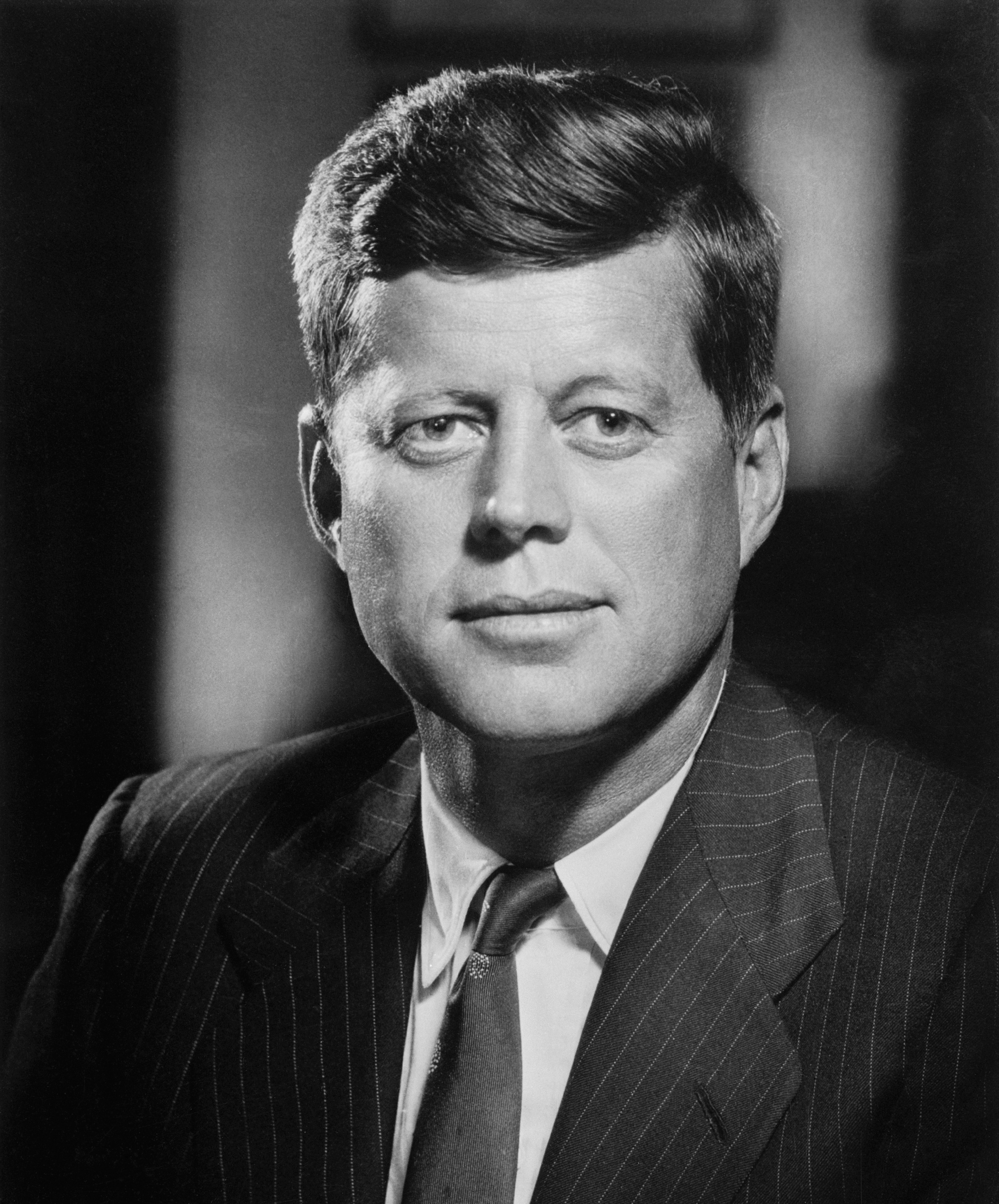
The assassination of President John F. Kennedy in 1963 influenced Martin A. Lee's interest in the topic which led him to write the book

With further research, Lee found a series of overlapping relationships involving the CIA, the Army, the scientific and psychiatric community, and literary culture as well as the Beat movement. Lee maintains that the "CIA was an unwitting midwife to the birth of the acid generation". The role of the CIA, Lee surmises, was only one of many responsible for the emergence of the Sixties counterculture, "a comingling of all these divergent streams".

Lee and writer Bruce Shlain used approximately 20,000 pages of unclassified documents obtained through the Freedom of Information Act as the source for their CIA and military drug experiment material. Lee was living in Washington DC at the time the book was published.

== Publication ==
Acid Dreams was published by Grove Press in 1985 and by MacMillan UK (London) in 2001. The book was on the San Francisco Chronicle's bestseller list for six weeks. Foreign-language editions of Acid Dreams have been published in France, the Czech Republic and in Spain. In 1992, Grove Atlantic published a revised edition with a new introduction by essayist Andrei Codrescu titled "Whose Worlds are These?", a play on a line from Robert Frost's poem, "Stopping by Woods on a Snowy Evening". Frost said he wrote the poem "about the snowy evening and the little horse as if I'd had a hallucination".

== Reception ==
Historian Richard H. Immerman, former Assistant Deputy Director of National Intelligence at the United States Department of State, criticized the book for focusing too much on the social history of the drug culture and not enough on the history of the involvement of the CIA. Physician and medical writer Andrew Weil praised the book for its "engaging" narrative and for showing "the government's complicity in the drug problem". Both psychotherapist Robert Leverant and librarian Jack Forman called the book "well-researched". However, Forman took exception to the overall length of the book and its confusing prose. Forman also thought that the topic of LSD lacked analysis, with the authors resorting instead to apologetics. Philosopher Duff Waring of York University called the book an "excellent addition to the history of psychedelia" and described the first part about declassified CIA files as "tightly written, first-class muck-raking."

== See also ==
- Operation Midnight Climax
