= György Ekrem-Kemál =

Hungarian neo-Nazist

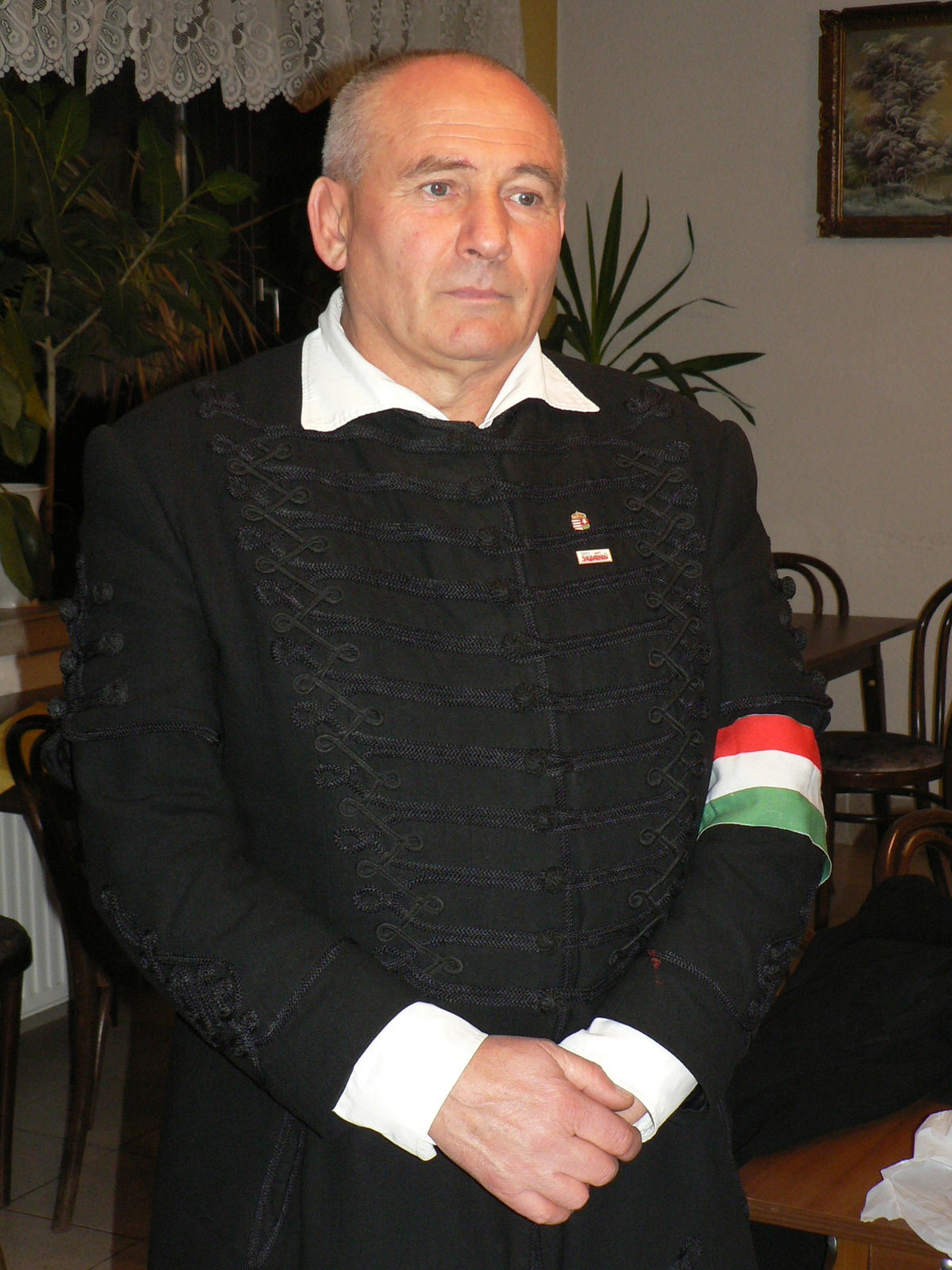
- György Ekrem-Kemál in 2007
- Born: June 29, 1945
- Died: June 12, 2009 (aged 63)
- Occupation: Political dissident

György Ekrem-Kemál (29 June 1945 – 12 June 2009) was a Hungarian nationalist, "Hungarist", far-right political figure, and leader of several organizations associated with Neo-Nazism and antisemitism.

== Life ==
Ekrem-Kemál was born to a Turkish-Hungarian father and a Hungarian mother. His father, Ekrem Kemál, was a prominent figure in the 1956 Hungarian Revolution as a "Széna tér" revolutionary against Soviet forces. He was executed for his role in the uprising, and is widely considered a martyr amongst the Hungarian far-right.

György Ekrem-Kemál died of lung cancer June 12, 2009, after a long illness.

== Political activities ==
On 20 April 1994 (Hitler's birthday), Ekrem-Kemál, already a well-known figure in Hungarian far-right circles (mostly due to his father), co-founded the Hungarian Hungarist Movement (Hungarian: Magyar Hungarista Mozgalom, MHM) alongside István Győrkös and Albert Szabó. It was a largely unsuccessful attempt to unify the Hungarian far-right under the umbrella of Hungarism, a historical ideological tenet of the Arrow Cross Party, the defunct fascist party that ruled Hungary briefly in 1944 and early 1945. The MHM failed to be cohesive, and, by 1996, the movement had largely scattered due to internal disputes.

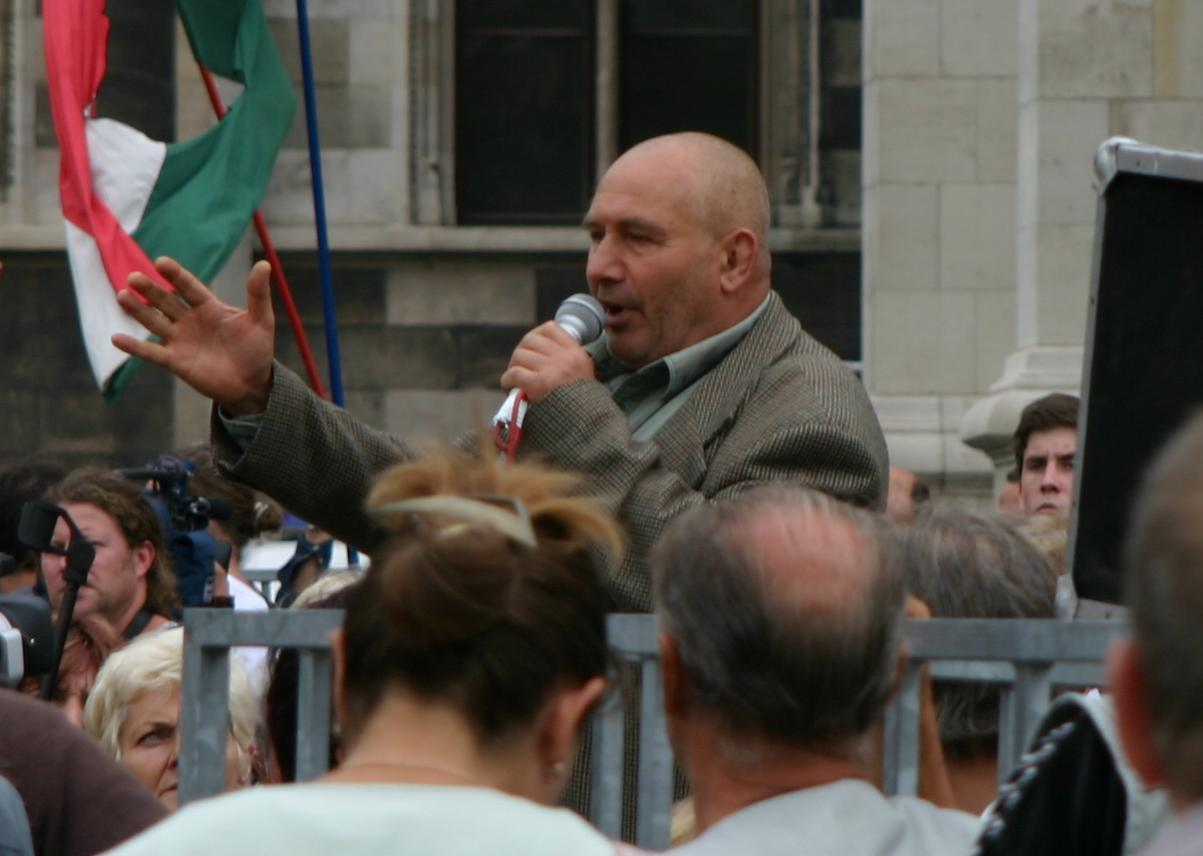
Ekrem-Kemál speaking at a rally in September 2006

In 1996, Ekrem-Kemál founded the Association of Those Persecuted by Communism (Hungarian: Kommunizmus Üldözötteinek Szövetsége, KÜSZ), a small organization established with the objective of overthrowing the relatively new parliamentary government. The KÜSZ claimed it would undertake these actions in order to continue the legacy of the Arrow Cross Party. Ekrem-Kemál was also at one point the leader of the Hungarian National Freedom Party (Hungarian: Magyar Nemzeti Szabadság Párt, MNSZP), another far-right organization.

Ekrem-Kemál was arrested in 1997 following his connection pipe bomb attacks on the offices of the then ruling Hungarian Socialist Party (MSZP). He was found guilty in May 2001 for attempting to organize a coup d'état against the Hungarian constitutional order. The Hungarian Supreme Court reduced his sentence to 4 years of probation on the basis of his movement having a "very long shot" to achieve its goal.

Ekrem-Kemál returned to prominence in 2006 during the 2006 protests in Hungary against the ruling Hungarian Socialist Party (MSZP). He joined the Revolutionary National Committee and spoke publicly at the protests in Kossuth Square, calling for the protesters (known as the Kossuth tér protesters) to mobilize against the existing government order. The protesters made frequent allusions to the 1956 Hungarian Revolution, further connecting Ekrem-Kemál, the son of a revolutionary "martyr", to the action.

== Ideology ==
Ekrem-Kemál's ideology was guided chiefly by "Hungarism", which traces itself back to the Arrow Cross Party and its leader, Ferenc Szálasi. Hungarism is a fascist ideology characterized by a unique conception of racial superiority (advantageous to Ekrem-Kemál) and a conventional fascist grounding in anti-Semitism.
