= The Right (Germany) =

Far-right political party in Germany

The Right Die Rechte
- President: Christian Worch
- Founded: 27 May 2012; 14 years ago
- Dissolved: 18 March 2025
- Split from: German People's Union
- Merged into: National Democratic Party of Germany
- Headquarters: Thusneldastr. 3; 44149 Dortmund
- Ideology: Neo-Nazism; Ultranationalism; Pan-Germanism; Anti-immigration
- Political position: Far-right
- Anthem: DIE RECHTE Parteihymne
- Bundestag: 0 / 709
- European Parliament: 0 / 96

Party flag

Website
- die-rechte.net (archived)

The Right – Party for Referendum, Sovereignty and Homeland Protection (German: Die Rechte – Partei für Volksabstimmung, Souveränität und Heimatschutz) was a far-right political party in Germany.

== History ==
The party was founded in 2012 by the neo-Nazi Christian Worch, along with many members of the German People's Union (DVU) in protest against the merger of their party into the National Democratic Party (NPD). The party name was inspired by Die Linke (The Left), a left-wing political party. In May 2012 circles of the dissolved DVU announced the establishment of a new party in competition with the NPD was planned. In June 2012, articles of association and the party program were forwarded to the Federal Returning Officer for examination. On 13 October 2012 the second federal convention of The Right took place in Ludwigshafen on the Rhine.

In January 2013, the Public Prosecutor's Office in Dortmund concluded that the founding of the North Rhine-Westphalian State Association was insufficient reason for a preliminary investigation. It examined a violation in August 2012 of the prohibition of association for the National Resistance Dortmund (Nationaler Widerstand Dortmund, NWDO). The "hard core" of the NWDO (Dennis Giemsch, Michael Brück and Siegfried Borchardt) had created a party on 15 September 2012.

On 5 July 2014, the 5th Federal Party Congress took place in Hamm (NRW), where Christian Worch was once again elected Federal Chairman. Ingeborg Lobocki resigned as Deputy Chairman and Treasurer for health reasons, replaced by Tatjana Berner.

On 13 January 2016, it was announced that the party's websites were deleted from the Facebook social network for violations of the company's Terms of Service.

On 28 October 2017, Worch was confirmed as chairman at the federal party convention with 78.4% of the votes. Subsequently, however, the Thuringian State Association demanded that the federal party should decide "that the party is fully committed to the rights of the German national community." Worch held a counter-speech and rejected the request for legal and political reasons. The majority of the members followed the Thuringian state association and not Worch. Worch then resigned and left the party.

Dutch Neo-Nazi and Hitler lookalike Stefan Wijkamp^{[nl]} was a former board member for the party.

Worch's successor was the multiply convicted Dortmund neo-Nazi squad Christoph Drewer. On 1 April 2018, Bruck and Sascha Krolzig were elected as federal co-chairmen at a federal party conference; At the same time, the party added in its name the wording "Party for Referendum, Sovereignty and Homeland Protection".

For the European elections in 2019, The Right chose the imprisoned, repeatedly sentenced 90-year-old Holocaust denier Ursula Haverbeck as its top candidate.

In 2023, the Dortmund section, which had several municipal advisors, joined The Homeland, considerably weakening Die Rechte. The party announced its dissolution in 2025.

== Election results ==
=== Federal Parliament (Bundestag) ===
| Election | Constituency | | Party list | | Seats | +/– | Status |
| Election | Votes | % | Votes | % | Seats | +/– | Status |
|---|---|---|---|---|---|---|---|
| 2013 | 2,245 | 0.0 | | | 0 / 631 | New | Extra-parliamentary |
| 2017 | 1,142 | 0.0 | 2,054 | 0.0 | 0 / 631 | New | Extra-parliamentary |

=== European Parliament ===
| Election | Votes | % | Seats | +/– |
|---|---|---|---|---|
| 2019 | 24,598 | 0.07 (#36) | 0 / 96 | ▲ |
