= Hungarian National Front =

Hungarian National Front Magyar Nemzeti Arcvonal
- Leader: István Győrkös
- Deputy Leader: István Győrkös, Jr.
- Founded: 1989
- Dissolved: December 2016
- Headquarters: Győr, Hungary
- Newspaper: Új Rend; Jövőnk; Hídfő
- Ideology: Neo-Hungarism; Neo-fascism
- Political position: Far-right

The Hungarian National Front (Hungarian: Magyar Nemzeti Arcvonal; MNA) was a far-right Hungarist paramilitary movement, founded in 1989 by István Győrkös as Hungarian National Socialist Action Group (Hungarian: Magyar Nemzetiszocialista Akciócsoport; also abbreviated MNA). The organization adopted its current name on 29 November 1992, after a court ruled to ban National Socialist name and symbols.

== Paramilitary activities in connection with Russian state agents ==
In 2016, Hungarian authorities became aware that GRU agents - enjoying diplomatic immunity - trained members of Hungarian National Front in mock combat as many as 5 times a year.

Hungarian secret services were aware of the collaboration between the organization and the Russian state agents, but could not take action because the mock combat activities did not violate any laws. The events escalated when police obtained a search warrant under the suspicion that the leader of the organization, István Győrkös, was in possession of firearms illegally. When police attempted to execute the search warrant, István Győrkös shot and killed an officer. Following the events, police executed 13 additional search warrants and indicted 17 individuals.

Several members of the organization were later convicted because of illegal possession of a large quantity of weapons and ammunition and some explosives. The GRU members involved in training with the group returned home after being informally asked to do so, without escalating a formal diplomatic incident between Russia and Hungary.

The incident led to the dissolution of the organization.
