= Thomas Lemke (serial killer) =

German serial killer (born 1969)

- Born: 1969 (age 56–57); Germany
- Convictions: Murder; Rape
- Penalty: Life imprisonment

Details
- Victims: 3
- Span of crimes: 1995–1996
- Country: Germany

Thomas Lemke (born 1969) is a German far-right serial killer, who was convicted of three murders.

He was a member of various far-right organizations, including the Wiking-Jugend and the Free German Workers' Party. Lemke was also a mercenary in the HOS militia during the Croatian War. In his apartment, the police also found so-called Anti-Antifa lists of enemies with names and addresses of political opponents.

== Crimes ==
Lemke, who had been convicted for arson, assault, Volksverhetzung (incitement to hatred) and illegal possession of firearms, on 18 July 1995 drove together with his girlfriend Bianka W. and mutual friend Dagmar K. to Altena, where they kidnapped one of his girlfriend's acquaintances, gagged her, took her to a forest and began strangling her with a rope. As the victim gasped, Lemke hit her several times with a folding spade, burying the dead woman in a hole in the ground. The prosecution suspected that he forced his girlfriend to act in order to "have her in hand", because he feared she would report him, and began acting more violently towards her.

On 2 February 1996, Lemke went to Oberhausen and visited his friend Marcel M. Together they drove to Bergisch Gladbach to the apartment of Patricia W. Lemke had met her at the station in Hagen and because she had a sticker saying "Nazis out" on her clothes, he wanted to kill her. The woman opened the door, whereupon she was immediately handcuffed, undressed, raped by Lemke, throttled with a shoelace, hit with a plaster cast on the head and finally killed by 91 stab wounds.

On 15 March 1996, Lemke shot dead 26-year-old Martin Kemming at a staircase in Rhade. Kemming was a traitor in Lemke's eyes because he had announced that he was dropping out of the far-right scene and was going to testify against Lemke.

== Conviction ==
He was sentenced in March 1997 by the Essen court of assize for three murders and one rape to life imprisonment, with subsequent placement in psychiatry and preventative detention. By determining the particular gravity of the guilt, the court imposed the maximum penalty. Bianka W. was sentenced to six years for murder and Marcel M. was sentenced to five years in prison for aiding and abetting.

== See also ==
- List of German serial killers
