= Thomas Lemke (sociologist) =

German sociologist

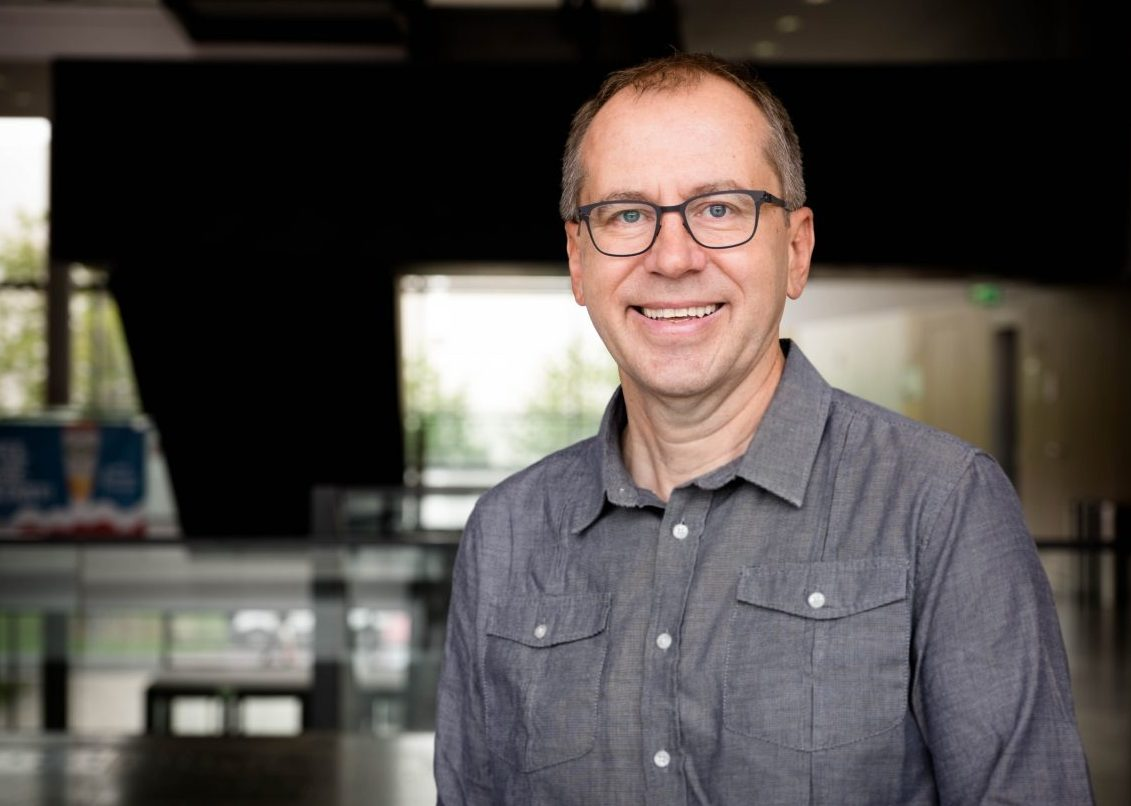
- Lemke in 2019
- Born: 24 September 1963 (age 62); Bad Lauterberg, Lower Saxony, Germany
- Citizenship: German
- Education: Goethe University Frankfurt
- Known for: Governmentality, Biopolitics, Biopower
- Scientific career
- Fields: Sociology, Social Theory
- Workplaces: Goethe University Frankfurt, University of Wuppertal, New York University, Copenhagen Business School
- Thesis: Eine Kritik der politischen Vernunft
- Doctoral advisor: Joachim Hirsch, Alex Demirovic
- Notable students: Torsten Voigt

Thomas Lemke (born 24 September 1963 in Bad Lauterberg) is a German sociologist and social theorist. He is best known for his work on Governmentality, Biopolitics and his readings of Michel Foucault. He is a Professor of Sociology with specialization in Biotechnologies, Nature and Society at the Faculty of Social Sciences at Goethe University Frankfurt, Frankfurt am Main, Germany.

== Biography ==
Thomas Lemke studied political sciences and sociology at the Goethe University Frankfurt, the University of Southampton and the Pantheon-Sorbonne University. In 1996 he received a PhD with a thesis on Michel Foucault under supervision of Joachim Hirsch and Alex Demirovic. In 2008, Lemke was appointed full professor at the Institute of Sociology at Goethe University Frankfurt, Germany. Prior to this, he held positions at the Copenhagen Business School, and the University of Wuppertal. Furthermore, he was a research fellow at the New York University with Emily Martin and at Goldsmith College with Nikolas Rose.

== Work ==
Thomas Lemke has published extensively on the social implications of the life sciences and contributed to the theoretical advancement of social theory and the social studies of biotechnology. He is especially recognized for his readings of Foucault and theoretical contributions to the debates on governmentality and biopolitics. In his book Biopolitics: An Advanced Introduction he offers a systematic overview of the history of the notion of biopolitics. Michael Hardt, co-author of Empire says about the book "Thomas Lemke traces with beautiful clarity the genealogy of the concept of biopolitics. [...] This is essential reading for anyone interested in the current debates surrounding biopolitics". He has published and edited more than 15 books and his works have been translated into Danish, Dutch, English, Korean, Polish, Portuguese and Turkish. Furthermore, he has published articles in German, French, and English in leading international journals such as Critical Social Studies, Distinktion, New Genetics and Society, Sociology, and Theory, Culture & Society. His work has been frequently cited in scholarly and public debates and he regularly contributes to the intellectual discourse in Germany in major newspapers and on national radio and television.

== Awards and recognition ==
In 2008, Lemke was awarded a Heisenberg Professorship by the German Research Foundation, one of the most prestigious grants in Germany.

In 2014, Lemke was awarded an opus magnum fellowship by the Volkswagen Foundation for his book project "The Government of Things. Foundations and Perspectives of New Materialism".

In 2018, he received a prestigious ERC Advanced Grant awarded by the European Research Council for his project CRYOSOCIETIES.

== Publications (selection) ==
=== Monographs ===
- Lemke, T. (2013). Perspectives on Genetic Discrimination. New York, NY: Routledge.
- Lemke, T. (2012). Foucault, Governmentality, and Critique. Bolder, CO: Paradigm Publishers.
- Lemke, T. (2011). Biopolitics: An Advanced Introduction. New York, NY: New York University Press
- Lemke, T. (1991). Eine Kritik der politischen Vernunft – Foucaults Analyse der modernen Gouvernementalität. Hamburg/Berlin: Argument Verlag, 5th Edition 2011. ISBN 978-3886192519.

=== Edited volumes ===
- Heinemann, T., I. Helén, L. Lemke, U. Naue, and M. Weiss (2015). Suspect Families: DNA Analysis, Family Reunification and Immigration Policies. Farnham and Burlington, VT: Ashgate
- Bröckling, U., S. Krasmann, and T. Lemke (2011). Governmentality: Current Issues and Future Challenges. New York, NY: Routledge.

=== Journal articles ===
- Heinemann, T.; Lemke, T. (2012). "Suspect Families: DNA Kinship Testing in German Immigration Policy". Sociology. 47 (4): 810. doi:10.1177/0038038512454352. S2CID 143574466.
- Lemke, T. (2011). "Critique and Experience in Foucault". Theory, Culture & Society. 28 (4): 26–48. doi:10.1177/0263276411404907. S2CID 143302116.
- Lemke, T. (2007). "An indigestible meal? Foucault, governmentality and state theory". Distinktion: Scandinavian Journal of Social Theory. 8 (2): 43–64. doi:10.1080/1600910X.2007.9672946. S2CID 7117301.
- Lemke, T. (2001). "'The birth of bio-politics': Michel Foucault's lecture at the Collège de France on neo-liberal governmentality". Economy and Society. 30 (2): 190–207. doi:10.1080/713766674.
