= Michael Kühnen =

German neo-Nazi leader

- Kühnen, interviewed on television
- Born: 21 June 1955; West Germany
- Died: 25 April 1991 (aged 35); Kassel, Germany
- Occupation: Neo-Nazi leader

Michael Kühnen (21 June 1955 – 25 April 1991) was a leader in the German neo-Nazi movement. He was one of the first prominent post-World War II Germans to openly embrace Nazism and call for the formation of a Fourth Reich. He enacted a policy of setting up several differently named groups in an effort to confuse German authorities, who were attempting to shut down neo-Nazi groups. Kühnen's homosexuality was made public in 1986. He died of HIV-related complications in 1991.

== Early life ==
Kühnen was raised as a staunch Roman Catholic, and initially came to politics in his early teens as a Maoist. When he took a job at the shipyards of Hamburg, Kühnen moved to the far right, joining a local National Democratic Party of Germany (NPD) youth group. He did not remain long in the NPD, soon denouncing party members as "a bourgeois crowd of swines", and leaving the party to join the neo-Nazi movement.

== 1970s ==
Following his departure from the NPD, Kühnen had a brief spell in the German Army but he was dishonourably discharged in 1977 for attempting to spread Nazi propaganda in his barracks. During that time, he studied at the Helmut Schmidt University, originally known as the University of the German Federal Armed Forces Hamburg, located in Hamburg, Germany.

After this expulsion, he took his first steps in organising a new movement, setting up the Action Front of National Socialists. Initially, the organisation consisted only of Kühnen, but he soon made contact with like-minded individuals across West Germany, resulting in a nationwide network of cells. The group soon became notorious for its violent activities, which included bank robberies and arms raids, often working in tandem with other similar groups, such as the Wiking-Jugend.

Known as the leader of the group, Kühnen was arrested in 1979 and sentenced to three and a half years in prison for inciting violence and racial hatred. Released in 1982, he set about trying to reorganise the Action Front of National Socialists, merging them with Thomas Brehl's National Activists. The attempts were hindered by the Ministry of the Interior, who outlawed the group in November 1983.

== 1980s ==
With the ANS/NA banned, Kühnen turned his attention to the fledgling Free German Workers' Party (FAP) and encouraged his supporters to infiltrate and take over the group. Kühnen's bid was successful, largely due to the fairly insignificant nature of the FAP before Kühnen, but nonetheless, he found that support for his cause had waned during his prior incarceration. Some believe this was due to a move away from orthodox Nazism to Strasserism in the German underground, leaving Kühnen's position somewhat compromised.

Kühnen then began to look to Ernst Röhm for inspiration, and he broke away from full support for Adolf Hitler, condemning Hitler's purges against the SA and calling for a return to pre-1934 Nazism. Alongside the infiltration, he formed his own successor group, the Gesinnungsgemeinschaft der Neuen Front in 1984.

With rumours spreading that he was to be arrested, Kühnen fled to Paris in early 1984 and sought refuge with the neo-Nazi group Fédération d'action nationale et européenne (FANE), with whom he had previously established contacts. Whilst working with FANE, he visited Spain and met with Léon Degrelle, establishing relations with the former Waffen-SS man who had become a central player in the Spanish Circle of Friends of Europe (CEDADE). Kühnen was arrested in Paris and extradited to Germany to face trial on a number of charges related to neo-Nazism. He was sentenced to a further four years in prison.

In 1986, while in prison, Kühnen came out as gay. In response to critics within the neo-Nazi movement, he argued that his lack of a family meant he had more time to devote to militancy, and he pointed out that Ernst Röhm was also a gay Nazi. However, Kühnen lost much support in the strongly-homophobic neo-Nazi scene. The FAP split, with Kühnen's former ally Friedhelm Busse leading the larger anti-gay wing, which held effective control of the party by 1989.

Kühnen was released from prison in March 1988, and almost immediately, he set up a new group, Nationale Sammlung. When this group was banned the following year, he enacted a policy of setting up group after group, in an effort to confuse authorities. Of these movements, German Alternative was the most well-known. During this period, it was revealed that Kühnen had contracted HIV.

== 1990s ==
Again implementing his direct action approach, Kühnen led a group of white power skinheads to Frankfurt an der Oder on 8 April 1991, to protest against the opening of the Polish border. Despite a police presence, Kühnen led the group in throwing stones and other projectiles at cars crossing the border.

Kühnen died on 25 April 1991, of AIDS-related diseases. He was cremated at the Kasseler Westfriedhof (Kassel West Cemetery).

The Polish border incident was Kühnen's last public action. Within Germany, his death had a twofold effect on neo-Nazism; it meant the loss of its most dynamic leader, and it meant that the divisions he had caused would be largely left behind. He was effectively succeeded by Christian Worch, his closest ally, whom Kühnen had nominated to take over his leadership.

== Publications ==
- Die zweite Revolution. Glaube und Kampf (Band I & Band II), 1979
  - Unofficial Dutch translation: De tweede revolutie (Deel I & Deel II), Nationaalsocialistische Bibliotheek, 2025
- Einführung in die NS-Lebensanschauung, JVA Celle: JdF, 1982
  - Unofficial Dutch translation: Inleiding in de nationaalsocialistische levensbeschouwing, Nationaalsocialistische Bibliotheek, 2025
- Das 25 Punkte Programm der NSDAP neukommentiert, 1985
  - Unofficial Dutch translation: De 25 punten van het programma van de NSDAP, Nationaalsocialistische Bibliotheek, 2025
- Führertum zwischen Volksgemeinschaft und Elitedenken, JVA Butzbach: JdF, 1985
- Politisches Soldatentum: Tradition und Geist der SA, JVA Frankfurt: JdF, 1985
  - Unofficial Dutch translation: Politiek soldatendom, traditie en geest der SA, Nationaalsocialistische Bibliotheek, 2025
- Nationalsozialismus und Homosexualität, Paris: Michel Caignet, 1986
  - Official French translation: National-socialisme et homosexualité, Nantes: Éditions Ars magna, 2004, ISBN 978-2-912164-33-9
- Nationalsozialismus oder „Abschied vom Hitlerismus“? Eine notwendige Klarstellung, JVA Celle: JdF, 1986
- Lexikon der Neuen Front, 1987
  - Unofficial Dutch translation: Lexicon van het Neuen Front, Nationaalsocialistische Bibliotheek, 2026
- Offener Brief an einen evangelischen Jugendpfarrer
- Gedanken zum Sozialismus
- Gedanken zur Ethik

== Bibliography ==
- Martin A. Lee, The Beast Reawakens, London: Warner Books, 1998
- Kühnen v. Federal Republic of Germany, 12 May 1988, Application No. 12194/86 (European Commission of Human Rights)
