= Martin A. Lee =

American author and activist

- Citizenship: United States
- Education: University of Michigan
- Writing career
- Subjects: Far-right movements, terrorism, drug politics, media
- Notable work: The Beast Reawakens

Martin A. Lee is an American author and activist. He has written books and articles about far-right movements, terrorism, media issues, and drug politics, including Acid Dreams and The Beast Reawakens. Lee was a co-founder of the media watch group Fairness & Accuracy in Reporting (FAIR).

== Education and career ==
Lee has an undergraduate degree in philosophy from the University of Michigan. He has been a guest teacher-in-residence at the University of Illinois and has lectured at many colleges and universities, including Harvard University, Columbia University, Dartmouth College, Johns Hopkins University, and the American University of Paris. In 1994 he was given the Pope Foundation Award for Investigative Journalism.

Lee was a co-founder of the media watch group Fairness & Accuracy in Reporting (FAIR), a group formed in 1986 to combat perceived corporate and establishment media bias. He was the first full-time editor of FAIR's magazine Extra!, and later served as the publication's publisher.

With fellow journalist Kevin Coogan, he met fascist François Genoud and interviewed him in Lausanne in 1986, in order to write an article. Genoud only agreed to meet with Coogan and Lee with the condition that the interview not be taped and he not be directly quoted. The article came out in Mother Jones in May 1987, the only American journalistic investigation into Genoud while he was alive.

Lee's first book, Acid Dreams: The CIA, LSD and the Sixties Rebellion (co-authored with Bruce Shlain), was published in 1985 by Grove Press. Covering LSD's use by both the counterculture of the 1960s and by the CIA in mind control experiments.

Lee's second book, Unreliable Sources: A Guide to Detecting Bias in News Media (co-authored with Norman Solomon), was both a distillation and expansion of his work with FAIR. Published in 1990 by Lyle Stuart, The Washington Post called the book "a worthy addition to the library of any student of American news media, social structure and political science."

Lee's third book, The Beast Reawakens, an in-depth examination of the resurgence of fascism, was published by Little, Brown in 1997; a revised paperback edition was issued by Routledge in 2000. Calling it a "compelling, intelligent investigation which reads more like a thriller than a history lesson," Publishers Weekly said it "contributes much toward understanding the politics of hatred." The New York Times Book Review described it as "a vivid survey of fascist resurgence."

== Bibliography ==
- 1985 – Acid Dreams: The CIA, LSD, and the Sixties Rebellion – co-authored with Bruce Shlain (Grove Press) ISBN 0-394-55013-7
- 1990 – Unreliable Sources: A Guide to Detecting Bias in News Media – co-authored with Norman Solomon (Lyle Stuart) ISBN 0-8184-0521-X
- 1997 – The Beast Reawakens (Little, Brown and Company) ISBN 0-316-51959-6
- 2000 – The Beast Reawakens (revised paperback edition: Routledge) ISBN 0-316-51959-6
- 2012 – Smoke Signals: A Social History of Marijuana – Medical, Recreational, and Scientific (Scribner, August 2012) ISBN 1439102600
