= Wiking-Jugend =

German Neo-Nazi youth organization

Wiking-Youth
- Wiking-Jugend
- Odal rune on flag of the Wiking-Jugend
- Abbreviation: WJ
- Named after: Wikings
- Formation: 1 January 1952
- Dissolved: 10 October 1994
- Type: Neo-Nazi youth wing
- Legal status: Defunct, illegal
- Purpose: Indoctrination
- Headquarters: Stolberg (Rhinland) close to Aachen
- Location: West Germany, Germany
- Members: 400-500 (1994)
- Official language: German
- Bundesführer: Walter Matthaei (1952–1967); Wolfgang Nahrath (1967–1994); Wolfram Nahrath (1994)
- Parent organization: official none, de-facto NPD
- succeeding organzitation: Heimattreue Deutsche Jugend e. V. (HDJ), 1990–2009

The Wiking-Jugend (WJ, "Viking youth") was a German Neo-Nazi organization modeled on the Hitler Youth.

Wiking-Jugend emerged in 1952 from a merger of several German right-wing extremist youth groups. In 1994 it was banned by the Federal Ministry of the Interior. At that time it had 400 to 500 members and was considered the largest Neo-Nazi youth organization in Germany.

The Wiking-Jugend was the cadre organization for leading right-wing extremists in Germany. It socialized the right-wing terrorist groups of the 1970s and 80s, as well as the cadres of the neo-Nazi movement in East Germany after reunification.

== History ==
The Sozialistische Reichspartei (SRP) was outlawed in 1952, together with its youth organization "Reichsjugend". The Neo-Nazis went underground in numerous fragmented follow-up organizations, and the former Reichsjugend, the Vaterländischer Jungenbund and the Deutsche Unitarier-Jugend eventually coalesced again in the form of the "Wiking-Jugend". The group was active in the pan-European nationalist New European Order, although they quit in 1955 over the issue of South Tyrol.

The organization was founded by Walter Matthaei, and thereafter took on a dynastic tendency, being headed in turn by Raoul Nahrath, then his son Wolfgang, and then his son Wolfram.

Pekka Siitoin extended an invitation to Wiking-Jugend to visit him, and Wiking-Jugend did hold a camp in Finland in 1976 and created controversy by plastering posters calling for the release of Rudolf Hess.

Until 1991, Stolberg (Rhineland) was the headquarters of the WJ. From 1991 to 1994, it was in Berlin. There was a direct connection to the NPD. At times the Wiking Youth and the NPD youth organization has a registered under the address of the former WJ chairman Wolfgang Nahraths. When the WJ was banned in 1994, the JN served as a catch basin for numerous former WJ members.

The Wiking-Jugend was outlawed as unconstitutional on 10 November 1994 by the North Rhine-Westphalian Ministry of the Interior. The successor organization was the Heimattreue Deutsche Jugend (Homeland-loyal German Youth) (HDJ), which follows the WJ tradition. It was also banned in March 2009.

== Name ==
Analogous to the recruitment practices of SS volunteers in Western and Northern Europe, Wiking Youth established structures in France, Spain, Great Britain, Switzerland, and Norway. During its founding phase, the Wiking-Jugend was ideologically and generationally closely linked to the Waffen-SS veterans' associations, whose magazine bore the title "Wiking-Ruf" ("Viking Call").

== Structure ==
The structure of the WJ was strongly based on the Hitler Youth: subunits were "Gaue" and "Forste", the children and teens were organized separately according to gender into boys' and girls' groups. The minimum age for membership was six years. There was no upper age limit; membership was for life.

The WJ pursued the intention of training its members in neo-Nazi ideology. It regularly organized camps and marches, which also intend as a paramilitary training. According to the WJ, a total of 15,000 children and young people are said to have completed their school.

== Influence ==
The WJ was long considered the most important far-right youth organization in the Federal Republic of Germany. For many activists in the far-right and Neonazi scene, Wiking-Jugend (WJ) served as a springboard into political organizations and parties.

A direct connection existed to the National Democratic Party of Germany, today "The Homeland". At times, the Wiking-Jugend and the NPD's youth organization, Junge Nationaldemokraten (JN), were registered at the address of former WJ leader Wolfgang Nahraths. When the WJ was banned, the JN served as a refuge for numerous former WJ members.

The "Wehrsportgruppe Rohwer" (Rohwer Military Sports Group) a right terrorist group of Uwe Rohwer and Michael Kühnen was recruited by members of Wiking Youth. Rohwer was Gau leader of WJ in the Flensburg region and used his "Wiking farm" ("Wikinger Hof") in a small village as military training ground for Neonazis. The members of "Wehrsportgruppe Rohwer" called themselves "Werwolfs". The group members, who were charged in the Bückeburg trial in 1979 with forming a terrorist organization and other offenses. When Rohwer left prison, he was active in WJ again.

== Members ==
Well known members:

- Bela Ewald Althans
- Manfred Börm
- Gudrun Burwitz
- Friedhelm Busse
- Lisbeth Grolitsch
- Thorsten Heise
- Odfried Hepp
- Eric Kaden
- Gundolf Köhler
- Stefan Köster
- Thomas Lemke
- Walter Matthaei
- Dirk Nahrath
- Raoul Nahrath
- Wolfgang Nahrath
- Wolfram Nahrath
- Udo Pastörs
- Anton Pfahler
- Sebastian Räbiger
- Frank Rennicke
- Edda Schmidt
- Ralph Tegethoff
- Björn Ulbrich
- Sascha Wagner
- Norbert Weidner
- Rudi Wittig
- Thomas Wulff

== See also ==
- Wotanism
