= The Beast Reawakens =

1997 book by Martin A. Lee

- Cover of the 1997 edition
- Author: Martin A. Lee
- Language: English
- Subject: Neo-Nazism
- Publisher: Little, Brown and Company
- Publication date: 1997
- Publication place: United States
- Media type: Print (Hardcover and Paperback)
- Pages: 546
- ISBN: 0-316-51959-6
- OCLC: 36066018
- Dewey Decimal: 320.53
- LC Class: JC481.L43 1997

The Beast Reawakens (later prints carried the subtitle Fascism's Resurgence from Hitler's Spymasters to Today's Neo-Nazi Groups and Right-Wing Extremists) is a 1997 book by investigative journalist Martin A. Lee documenting the transition of classical fascism to modern day neo-fascism.

== Contents ==
The book opens with a quotation from T. E. Lawrence's Seven Pillars of Wisdom (1922), a favorite of Hitler's favorite commando, SS-Standartenführer Otto Skorzeny. A large portion of the book focuses around Skorzeny, and Lee traces several "personalities" as throughlines in fascism's ideological development.

The author discusses old-guard fascists' strategy for survival and the revival of fascism since 1944. Special attention is given to ODESSA actions during the Cold War, international fascist networks, and political inroads to the right-wing mainstream.

== Background and publication history ==
Martin A. Lee is an American investigative journalist. The Beast Reawakens was published by Little, Brown and Company in 1997. Routledge published a revised paperback edition in 2000.

== Reception ==
Joshua Rubinstein, reviewing the book for The New York Times, called it "a vivid survey of fascist resurgence throughout Europe". Publishers Weekly described it as a "compelling, intelligent investigation, which reads more like a thriller than a history lesson", while Library Journal praised it as a "compelling work", especially in light of recent developments in militia movements. A review in Shofar gave a more mixed review, with reviewer David Meier calling its thesis "a disappointment" for the discerning reader, though entertaining. The Sunday Telegraph also disagreed with its main thesis, though called it "far better at the margins", praising its account of the ties between Nazis and government officials.
