= NSDAP/AO (1972) =

Neo-Nazi organization in the United States

NSDAP Aufbau und Auslandsorganisation
- Abbreviation: NSDAP/AO
- Formation: 1972; 54 years ago
- Founder: Gary Lauck
- Legal status: Active
- Purpose: Neo-Nazi propaganda distribution
- Location: United States
- Website: www.nsdapao.info

The NSDAP/AO is an American neo-Nazi organization. It was founded in 1972 by United States citizen Gary Rex Lauck (born in 1953) in Fairbury, Nebraska. The organization's name stands for "NSDAP Aufbau- und Auslandsorganisation" ("NSDAP Development and Foreign Organization").

Lauck's organization claims to be a continuation of the original NSDAP – the German initials for the full name of the Nazi Party – and supplies neo-Nazis worldwide with propaganda material. Since 1973 this new NSDAP/AO publishes neo-Nazi magazines – "NS-Kampfruf", for example – by his own account in ten languages. As one of its political aims it demands the readmission of the NSDAP as an eligible party in Germany and Austria. The group has also been active in a number of countries across Europe, both co-ordinating with local movements and distributing propaganda individually.
