= Sebastiaan Matheus Sigismund de Ranitz (1901–1987) =

Dutch lawyer, Nazi collaborator

3rd Secretary General of the Department of Public Information and the Arts
- In office 24 August 1943 – 5 May 1945
- Preceded by: Hermannus Reydon
- Succeeded by: Office abolished

Personal details
- Born: 9 February 1901 Amsterdam, the Netherlands
- Died: 2 June 1987 (aged 86) Amsterdam, the Netherlands
- Party: National Socialist Movement in the Netherlands (1936–1945)
- Occupation: Jurist, politician

Sebastiaan Matheus Sigismund de Ranitz (9 February 1901 – 2 June 1987) was a Dutch jurist and Nazi collaborator. He was the third and final Secretary-General of the Department of Public Information and the Arts, which was established by the civilian regime installed in the Netherlands by Nazi Germany during the occupation. He was charged in 1948 for being a member of the National Socialist Movement in the Netherlands (NSB) and served six years in prison. After his imprisonment, he spent time as a business advisor.

== Early life ==
De Ranitz was born in Amsterdam, the Netherlands, on 9 February 1901. His father was a doctor, and had established the Emma Children hospital in Amsterdam in 1865. The de Ranitz family was granted a noble title, jonkheer, by royal decree on 16 August 1906. De Ranitz's father died in 1912, and his mother in 1920.

In 1928, de Ranitz became a lawyer, working under Emile Hermans in Amsterdam. In 1936, de Ranitz secretly joined the National Socialist Movement in the Netherlands . He was married to Cornelia Catharina Elisabeth Campfens.

== Nazi occupation ==
Nazi Germany launched an invasion of the Netherlands on 10 May 1940, and the Dutch government capitulated four days later. De Ranitz thus went public with his NSB membership. Following the establishment of the Department of Public Information and the Arts in November 1940, he was made the head of its legal affairs.

On 9 February 1943, Hermannus Reydon, who had been made the department's secretary-general following the resignation of Tobie Goedewaagen the previous month, was mortally wounded in an attack by the Dutch resistance. By March, de Ranitz had been made acting secretary-general, delivering a speech at the first general meeting of the Press Guild. He also became the president of the Nederlandsche Kultuurkamer (Netherlands Chamber of Culture), an institution tasked with nazifying art by regulating its production and distribution.

Toward the end of 1944, the Allied forces made inroads in their liberation of the Netherlands. Claims that Breda had been liberated were broadcast on 5 September ("Mad Tuesday"), leading many Nazis to flee the Netherlands for Germany. De Ranitz left the Hague for the Kultuurkamer's regional office in Groningen, and though work continued, his absence caused the institution and its parent department great difficulty. The Nazi regime capitulated on 5 May 1945, officially ending the department and de Ranitz' office.

== Later life ==
De Ranitz was arrested in Groningen in early May 1945. Three years later, in mid-December 1948, he was brought before the Special Court of Justice and charged with being a member of the NSB, attempting to subvert Dutch culture, and propagating Nazism. Defended by a relative, he admitted to abetting the occupation regime and producing propaganda, but denied other charges. Prosecutor Frans van Voorst tot Voorst demanded nine years imprisonment, minus time served. Ultimately de Ranitz was only sentenced to six years, with the court finding that his position had been forced upon him and that he had not taken measures greatly disadvantageous to Dutch interests.

After his release, de Ranitz served as a business advisor. His wife Cornelia died on 5 July 1979 in Würzburg, Germany. De Ranitz died eight years later in Amsterdam, on 2 June 1987. He was cremated several days later.

== Works cited ==
- Amersfoort, Herman (2010). "Introduction". In Amersfoort, Herman; Kamphuis, Piet (eds.). May 1940: The Battle for the Netherlands. Brill. pp. 1–13. ISBN 978-90-04-18727-6.
- "De Eerste Algemeene Vergadering van het Persgilde" [The First General Meeting of the Press Guild]. De Gooi- en Eemlander (in Dutch). Deventer. 16 March 1943. p. 2.
- "Dolle Dinsdag" [Mad Tuesday] (in Dutch). Verzetsmuseum. Archived from the original on 8 August 2022.
- "Familiebericht" [Family News]. NRC Handelsblad (in Dutch). Rotterdam. 11 July 1979. p. 16.
- "Familiebericht" [Family News]. NRC Handelsblad (in Dutch). Rotterdam. 6 June 1987. p. 10.
- Foot, Richard; Bruin, Tabitha de (30 November 2023). "Liberation of the Netherlands". The Canadian Encyclopedia. Historica Canada. Archived from the original on 30 March 2024.
- "Jhr.Mr. S.M.S. de Ranitz" (in Dutch). Parlementair Documentatie Centrum. Archived from the original on 27 January 2022.
- "Jhr. mr. S.M.S. de Ranitz voor Haags Bijz. Hof" [Jhr. mr. S.M.S. de Ranitz before the Hague Special Court]. Provinciale Overijsselsche en Zwolsche Courant (in Dutch). Zwolle. 16 December 1948. p. 2.
- "Korte Berichten" [Court News]. Eindhovensch Dagblad (in Dutch). Eindhoven. 12 December 1948. p. 2.
- "Kultuurkamer – Kunst en Cultuur in de Tweede Wereldoorlog" [The Kultuurkamer – Art and Culture in the Second World War]. Historiek (in Dutch). 6 October 2022.
- "Mr. H. Reydon" (in Dutch). Parlementair Documentatie Centrum. Archived from the original on 2 March 2019.
- "Tegen Jhr. de Ranitz Negen Jaar Geëist" [For Jhr. de Ranitz Nine Years Demanded]. Trouw (in Dutch). Amsterdam. 16 December 1948. p. 3.
- "Verschillende Arrestaties te Groningen" [Various Arrests in Groningen]. Arnhems Dagblad (in Dutch). Arnhem. 2 May 1945. p. 1.
- Wesselink, Claartje (2014). Kunstenaars van de Kultuurkamer: Geschiedenis en Herinnering [Artists of the Kultuurkamer: History and Memory]. Bert Baker. ISBN 9789035140615.
