= Hermannus Reydon =

Dutch Nazi collaborator (1896–1943)

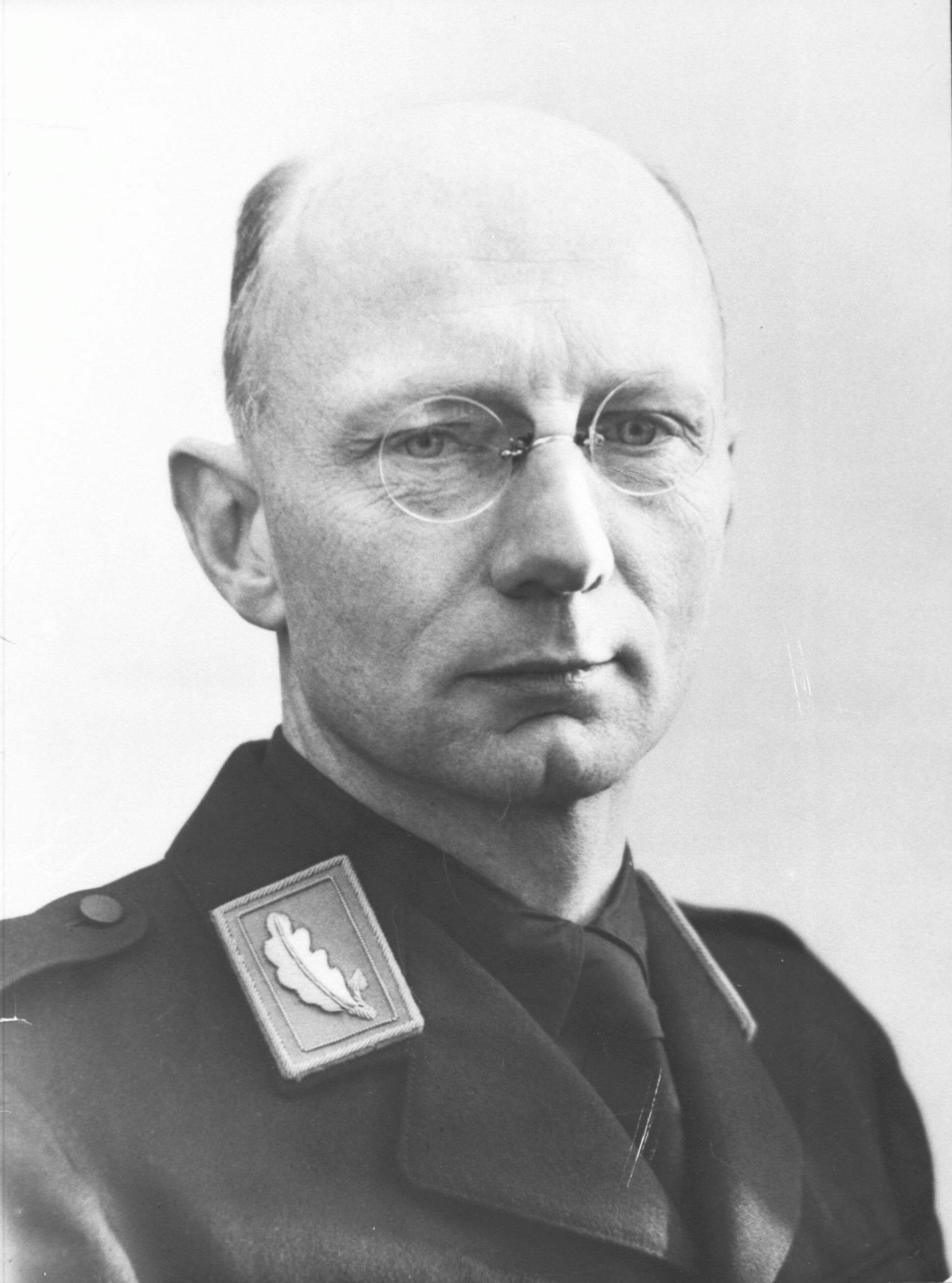

2nd Secretary General of the Department of Public Information and the Arts
- In office 1 February 1943 – 24 May 1943
- Preceded by: Tobie Goedewaagen
- Succeeded by: Sebastiaan de Ranitz

Personal details
- Born: 6 December 1896 Voorschoten, South Holland, the Netherlands
- Died: 24 August 1943 (aged 46)
- Party: National Socialist Movement in the Netherlands
- Occupation: Journalist, politician

Hermannus Reydon (6 December 1896 – 24 August 1943) was a Dutch journalist and Nazi collaborator. He served as the second Secretary-General of the Department of Public Information and the Arts, which had been established by the civilian regime installed in the Netherlands by Nazi Germany during the occupation.

Born in Voorschoten, Reydon received a law degree in Utrecht. He joined the National Socialist Movement in the Netherlands (NSB), and through the 1930s edited its publications Volk en Vaderland and Het Nationale Dagblad. Imprisoned shortly before Nazi Germany's invasion of the Netherlands in 1940, he was released by the Nazi regime. He was involved in several NSB organs, ultimately being installed as secretary-general of the Department of Public Information on 1 February 1943. His tenure was brief, as he and his wife Wilhelmina were attacked by the CS-6 cell of the Dutch resistance on 9 February; she died in the attack, while he died of his wounds more than six months later. More than fifty people were killed by the Nazis in retaliation for the assassinations of the Reydons and General Hendrik Seyffardt.

== Early life ==
Reydon was born in Voorschoten, the Netherlands, on 6 December 1896. He completed his studies in Utrecht, receiving a law degree in 1923. He married Wilhelmina Angenita Haak Steenhart.

Reydon was an early member of the National Socialist Movement in the Netherlands (NSB), registering with it in 1932 as Member 252. He advanced the party's interests through journalism, being part of the team that prepared the first issue of its weekly periodical Volk en Vaderland (January 1933) and remaining on its board of editors through 1938. Before the 1937 general election, the NSB established a daily newspaper titled Het Nationale Dagblad; Reydon was its political editor by 1938, and later became its editor-in-chief.

== Nazi occupation ==
As the Second World War escalated, Reydon was identified as one of the twenty-one most dangerous people to the Dutch state. Consequently, he was arrested by the Dutch government on 3 May 1940 and held in Ooltgensplaat. This detention was brief. The Netherlands was invaded by Nazi Germany the following week, and the Dutch government capitulated on 14 May. On 15 May, Reydon was released, and he returned to journalism. He continued as editor-in-chief of the Nationale Dagblad until December 1940.

During the early years of the occupation, Reydon became increasingly involved with politics and education. At the NSB, he became a member of the party's general, political, and propaganda councils, as well as its head of theoretical education. He also was charged with agricultural education and worked for the Nederlandschen Landstand.

After a falling out with NSB chairman Anton Mussert, Secretary General of the Department of Public Information and the Arts Tobie Goedewaagen resigned from his position on 28 January 1943. Reydon was named his successor, thereby becoming secretary general as well as the president of the Nazi-established Nederlandsche Kultuurkamer (Chamber of Dutch Culture) – an institution that was tasked with nazifying art by regulating its production and distribution. He took office on 1 February.

== Death and retaliation ==
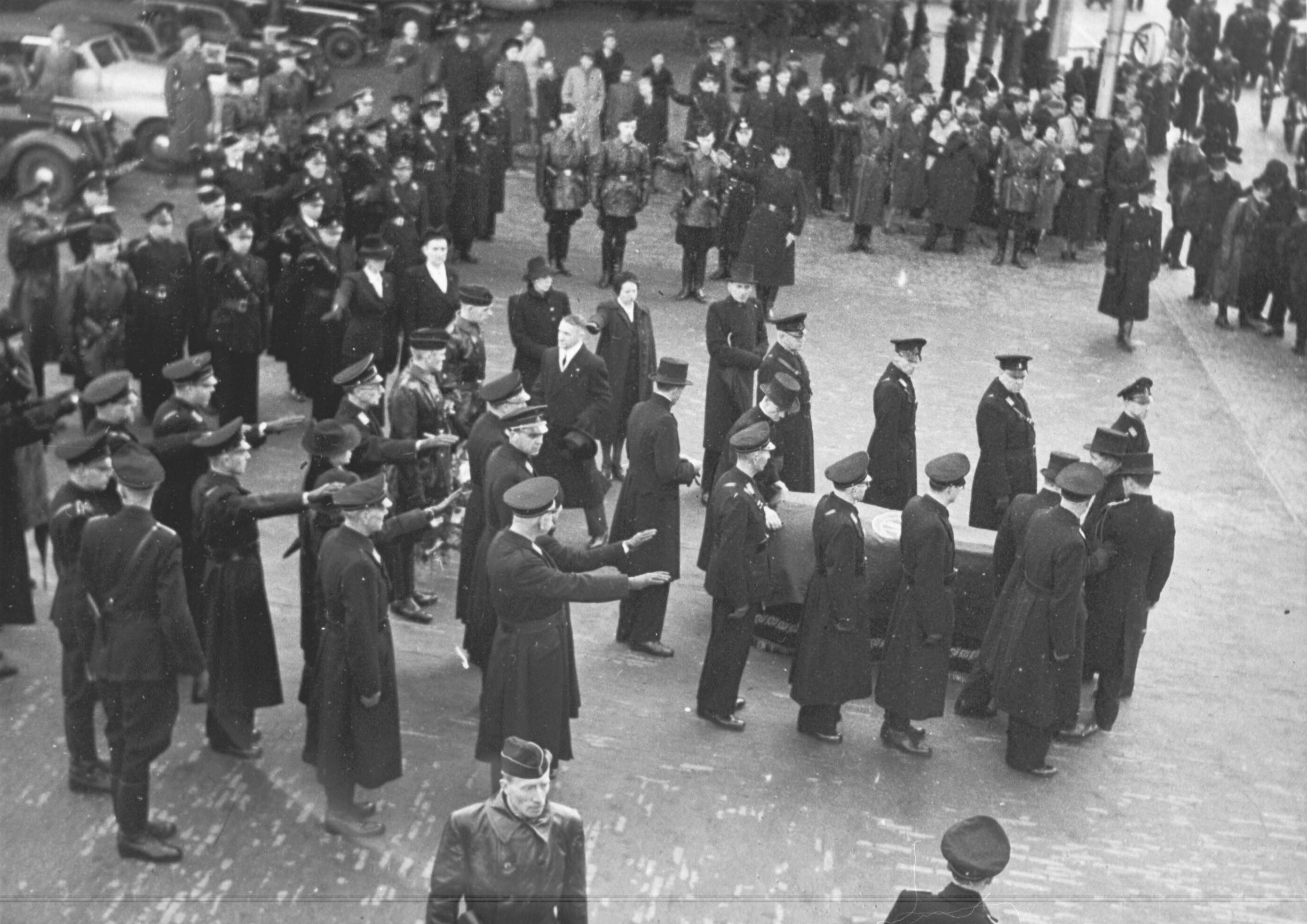
The funeral of Wilhelmina Reydon

Reydon did not hold these positions for long. On 9 February 1943, he and his wife were attacked at their home by the CS-6 cell of the Dutch resistance. In a speech, Cornelis van Geelkerken, the deputy chairman of the NSB, claimed that Wilhelmina was shot and killed by an intruder, who then waited fifteen minutes and attacked Hermannus as he entered the house. Reydon suffered several gunshot wounds, and the regime announced that he had little chance of survival. His office was taken over by Sebastiaan de Ranitz, a jurist who had headed the department's legal office, though officially Reydon remained secretary-general.

Reydon died of his wounds on 24 August 1943. Two days later, a hall at the Department of Public Information and the Arts' headquarters at the Prinsessegracht in The Hague was converted into a funeral parlour, with Reydon's body displayed to NSB members and staff. On 28 August, a funeral for Reydon was held, attended by numerous high-ranking members of the Nazi regime, including Mussert, reichskommissar Arthur Seyss-Inquart, SS representative Hanns Albin Rauter, and propagandist Wilhelm Ritterbusch. Reydon's body was subsequently escorted to the Staatsspoor Railway Station, then taken by train to Lunteren for burial. His wife had been interred there in February.

In retaliation for the attack on the Reydons, as well as the assassination of General Hendrik Seyffardt on 5 February, the Nazi regime began killing suspected members of the Dutch resistance. Under this new direction, codenamed "Operation Silbertanne", three individuals – mostly intellectuals or known opponents of the Nazi regime – would be executed for every German or Dutch Nazi killed. These extrajudicial killings were conducted by death squads under the command of Henk Feldmeijer, and many of the fifteen members were Dutch collaborators. Ultimately, more than fifty Dutch citizens were killed in reprisal. (Note: David Crossland, covering the trial of death squad member Heinrich Boere for Der Spiegel, gives fifty-four people killed (Crossland 2008). Traces of War, a project published by the Foundation for Information on World War Two, gives fifty-five (Traces of War, Hendrik Seyffardt).) Doctor Gerrit Kastein, the leader of CS-6, was arrested on 19 February 1943, and killed himself in custody.

== Works cited ==
- Amersfoort, Herman (2010). "Introduction". In Amersfoort, Herman; Kamphuis, Piet (eds.). May 1940: The Battle for the Netherlands. Brill. pp. 1–13. ISBN 978-90-04-18727-6.
- Crossland, David (14 April 2008). "86-Year-Old SS Killer Faces Murder Charges". Der Spiegel. Archived from the original on 10 June 2023.
- "De levensloop van den Nieuwen Secr.-Generaal" [The Life of the New Secr.-General]. Nieuwe Venlosche Courant (in Dutch). Venlo. 29 January 1943. p. 1.
- "De uitvaart van Mr. H. Reydon" [The Funeral of Mr. H. Reydon]. Drentsch Dagblad (in Dutch). Meppel. 28 August 1943. p. 1.
- "Hendrik Seyffardt". Traces of War. STIWOT. Archived from the original on 13 June 2024.
- "Jhr.Mr. S.M.S. de Ranitz" (in Dutch). Parlementair Documentatie Centrum. Archived from the original on 27 January 2022.
- "Kultuurkamer – Kunst en Cultuur in de Tweede Wereldoorlog" [The Kultuurkamer – Art and Culture in the Second World War]. Historiek (in Dutch). 6 October 2022.
- Lewin, Lisette (1983). Het Clandestiene Boek 1940–1945 [The Clandestine Books, 1940–1945]. Van Gennep. ISBN 9789060125502.
- "Liquidatie van Wilhelmina Angenita Haak Steenhart" [Funeral of Wilhelmina Angenita Haak Steenhart]. Network of War Collections. Archived from the original on 4 October 2023.
- "Mr. H. Reydon" (in Dutch). Parlementair Documentatie Centrum. Archived from the original on 2 March 2019.
- "Mr. H. Reydon Overleden" [Mr. H. Reydon Dies]. Nieuwsblad van het Noorden (in Dutch). Groningen. 25 August 1943. p. 1.
- "Uitvaart Mevr. Reydon" [Funeral of Mrs. Reydon]. Arnhemsche Courant (in Dutch). Arnhem. 18 February 1943. p. 1.
