= Nederlandsche Kultuurkamer =

German Nazi-sponsored art society in the Netherlands

Netherlands Chamber of Culture
- Nederlandsche Kultuurkamer

Agency overview
- Formed: 25 November 1941
- Dissolved: 1945
- Jurisdiction: Reichskommissariat Niederlande
- Headquarters: 2 Van de Boschstraat, The Hague
- Parent department: Department of Public Information and the Arts

The Netherlands Chamber of Culture (Dutch: Nederlandsche Kultuurkamer) was an institution established by Nazi Germany in the occupied Netherlands to regulate the production and distribution of art. Officially established on 25 November 1941, the chamber followed the model of the Reich Chamber of Culture in Germany and began operations on 22 January 1942. By 1 April of that year, all persons and institutions involved in the arts were required to register, with the former being demanded to submit an Aryan certificate and the latter being compelled to align their regulations with those of the chamber. By August 1944, the chamber had 42,000 registered members, from prominent artists to organ grinders.

Initially headed by Tobie Goedewaagen, the Nederlandsche Kultuurkamer was briefly led by Hermannus Reydon in February 1943 before Sebastiaan de Ranitz took office. The chamber consisted of six guilds, dealing respectively with theatre and dance, music, literature, film, architecture, and the press. It had the legislated power to close shops, impose fines on artists who continued to work in public without registering, and ban books, music broadcasts, and visual arts. The chamber also published its own magazine, De Schouw (The View).

After the Second World War ended in 1945, Goedewaagen and de Ranitz were both arrested; Reydon had died in August 1943 following an attack by the Dutch resistance. Members of the Nederlandsche Kultuurkamer were prohibited from public performance until cleared by the government. Artists who had resisted, either by refusing to register or by actively continuing to practise, were viewed more positively. The chamber's national headquarters in the Hague were destroyed during the bombing of the Bezuidenhout.

== History ==
=== Creation ===
Following the 1933 appointment of Adolf Hitler as chancellor of Germany, the Nazi Party rose to power in Germany through the 1930s. The expansionist regime annexed numerous areas, with the 1939 invasion of Poland officially recognized as the start of the Second World War. The Netherlands, hoping that neutrality would protect it as during the First World War, remained officially neutral. Nevertheless, Germany invaded the country on 10 May 1940. Four days later, after the city of Rotterdam was heavily damaged in a series of bombings, the government capitulated to the Nazi regime and Germany assumed control. In a May 1940 speech, Arthur Seyss-Inquart, the reichskommissar for the occupied Netherlands, promised that Dutch culture would remain unaffected. Nonetheless, as in other territories, the occupation regime ultimately enacted a policy of gleichschaltung – enforced political conformity.

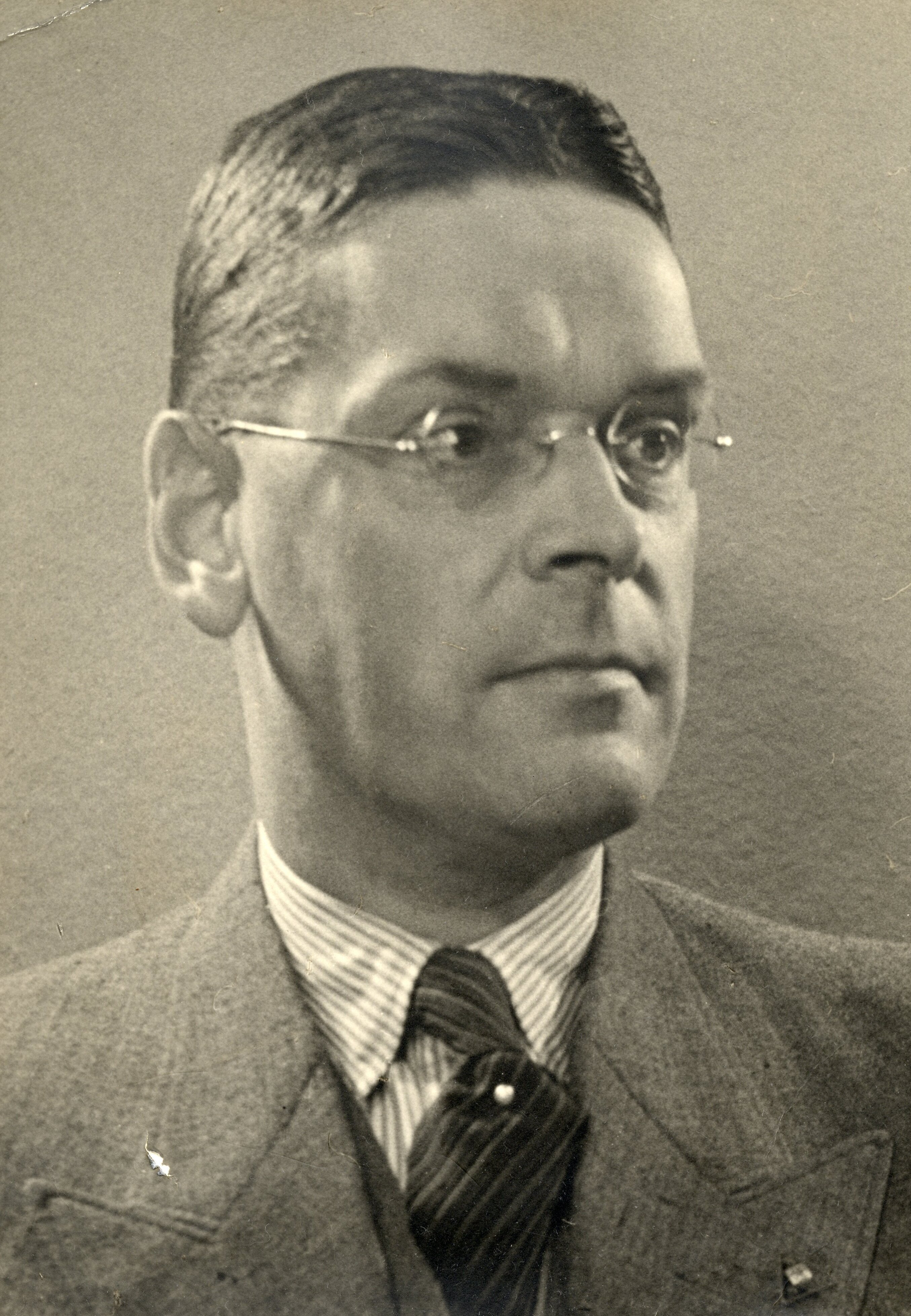
Tobie Goedewaagen, the first president of the chamber

In this capacity, the Nederlandsche Kultuurkamer was officially established on 25 November 1941. Operations began two months later, on 22 January 1942. Modelled after the Reich Chamber of Culture, which had been established in Germany in 1933, it was mandated with promoting Dutch culture "in the light of its responsibility towards the national community" (Note: Original: "... de Nederlandsche kultuur in het licht van haar verantwoordelijkheid tegenover de volksgemeenschap te bevorderen.") while simultaneously regulating and coordinating the cultural professions. Tobie Goedewaagen, a member of the National Socialist Movement in the Netherlands (NSB) who served concurrently as the Secretary General of the Department of Public Information and the Arts and the chamber's first president, described the chamber as necessary to bridge the cultural gap between artists and "the people". This, according to the institutional mandate, would be achieved by eradicating degenerate art and nazifying Dutch society.

To spread awareness of the Nederlandsche Kultuurkamer, the occupation government published a brochure titled Waarom een Nederlandsche Kultuurkamer? (Why a Netherlands Chamber of Culture?). This brochure emphasized the chamber's status as a regulatory, rather than professional, body and held that it organized artists and not art. A second pamphlet, detailing the organizational structure of the chamber, was published by the Nazi regime in November 1942. The chamber also published its own magazine, De Schouw (The View), between January 1942 and January 1945. Nonetheless, resistance among artists was high, with a 1942 open letter initiated by the sculptor Gerrit van der Veen receiving hundreds of signatures.

=== Leadership ===
Goedewaagen led the Nederlandsche Kultuurkamer from its inception through 28 January 1943, when he was dismissed from the NSB for failure to report to a disciplinary committee after a conflict with Anton Mussert. In his memoirs, he wrote that his leadership had been marked by tension with the German occupation government, including differences of opinion over the work of Jan Sluyters, as well as his opposition to the propaganda work of Ernst Voorhoeve. He was replaced by Hermannus Reydon, the former editor-in-chief of the NSB-associated Het Nationale Dagblad.

Reydon's leadership, however, was short-lived, as he was attacked by a member of the Dutch resistance on 9 February 1943. By March the acting presidency had been taken by Sebastiaan de Ranitz, a jurist who had headed the legal office at the Department of Public Information and the Arts. Reydon died of his wounds on 24 August of that year, and de Ranitz remained the president of the organization until its dissolution; the Parlementair Documentatie Centrum lists him as officially holding the role until May 1945, the month that the German regime capitulated.

=== Downfall ===
On 6 June 1944, Allied forces landed in Normandy, France. Over the next three months, these forces fought toward Belgium and the Netherlands. By 4 September, the Belgian port of Antwerp had been liberated. When this was reported in the Netherlands on 5 September 1944, together with claims that Allies were already in Breda, residents celebrated in the streets. This reverie, popularly known as Mad Tuesday, was premature; the Allies' Operation Market Garden to secure bridges across the Meuse, Waal, and Rhine Rivers was unsuccessful, and only parts of the southern Netherlands were liberated by the end of the month. Subsequent efforts, however, were able to secure the Scheldt River by November. Although the retreating Germans flooded parts of the Netherlands and induced famine, in early 1945 the First Canadian Army was pushing through the country.

Sometime after Mad Tuesday, as many Nazis and collaborators fled the Netherlands for Germany, de Ranitz left the national headquarters of the Nederlandsche Kultuurkamer for the Groningen regional office. The number of staff decreased steadily, in part due to increased demand for labour and Landwacht, and in part due to the flight of the loyalists. Over the ensuing months, staff in the Hague continued to write reports and make plans for further development. Some expected that, should the Allies liberate the Netherlands, they could simply transfer matters over to the new government. Ultimately, however, the national headquarters at Van de Boschstraat 2 was destroyed on 3 March 1945, after the Royal Air Force bombed the nearby Bezuidenhout neighbourhood.

Also in March 1945, the authorities in the liberated Netherlands announced that a special committee would be established under the Ministry of Education, Arts, and Science to assess the members of the Nederlandsche Kultuurkamer and their motivations. In the interim, all former members were prohibited from performing in public. Persons who had refused to join the chamber, meanwhile, could receive a declaration to that effect; these artists were viewed more positively than former members by the public. The Germans in the Netherlands officially surrendered on 5 May 1945, formally ending the chamber. In August 1945, A. Mout of the Hague was appointed liquidator, and both Goedewaagen and de Ranitz were ultimately arrested.

== Scope and organization ==
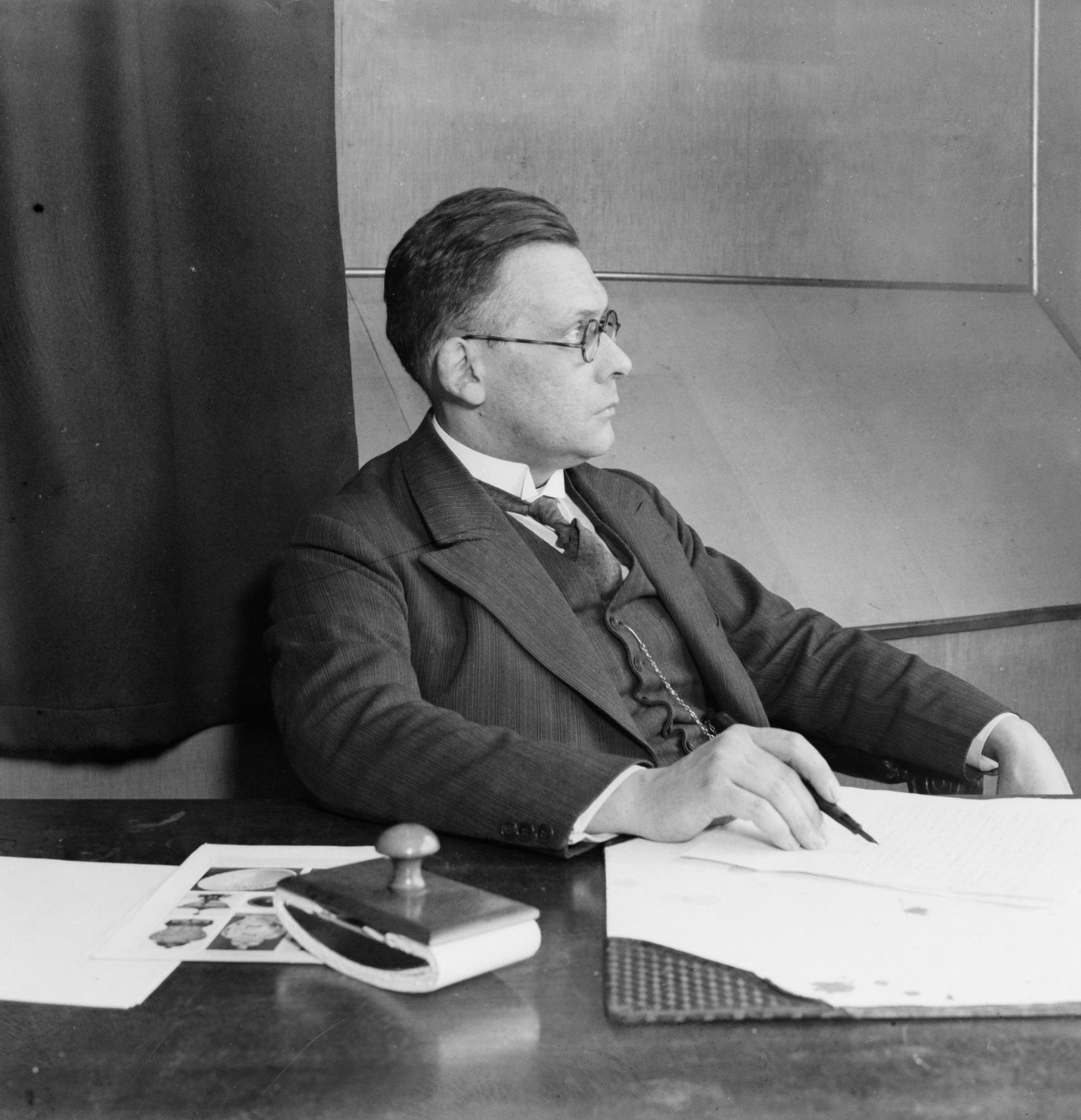
Jan de Vries, leader of the literature guild

In scope, the Nederlandsche Kultuurkamer encompassed all areas related to the production, reproduction, processing, distribution, maintenance, marketing, and mediation of cultural property, except where exclusively commercial, administrative, or mechanical. In exercising its mandate, the organization consisted of six guilds, variously responsible for theatre and dance, music, literature, film, architecture, and the press. These guilds were accountable to a president, who had the authority to appoint deputies and represent the chamber in court, as well as establish provincial branches. The president, in turn, was accountable to the Secretary General of the Department of Public Information and the Arts.

In music, the Nederlandsche Kultuurkamer prohibited the playing and broadcast of Jewish works, and several symphonies associated with Jewish musicians were disbanded. Later, censorship expanded to include music from Poland, Russia, the United Kingdom, and the United States, including jazz. Visual artists were limited in their approaches, and items deemed kitsch were prohibited; in 1944, several dealerships throughout the Netherlands that sold such works were closed by the chamber. Works by Marc Chagall and Pablo Picasso were deemed degenerate.

Much of the Nederlandsche Kultuurkamer's attention was given to the written word and film. The new regime deemed film to be a political weapon, and thus the German leadership put heavy emphasis on propaganda. In literature, the chamber established new awards to incentivize membership. At the same time, works by Albert Verwey and Henriëtte Roland Holst were banned, and lending libraries were subjected to significant oversight as potential promulgators of forbidden works. The literature guild, under the philologist Jan de Vries, promoted provincial (rather than urban) literature as coming "from the heart of the people". (Note: Original: "... het hart van het volk".) Consequently, the virtues of Evert Zandstra, Jan Eekhout, and Reinder Brolsma were extolled.

Meanwhile, in the press, the Nederlandsche Kultuurkamer controlled the mass media. Journalists were required to register with the government, as well as partake in a four-week introduction to National Socialism. Most commercial publications registered with the agency, fearing the commercial implications of non-compliance, though some individual journalists resisted. One member, De Telegraaf, published several pro-German articles during the war; consequently, after the liberation of the Netherlands in 1945, its publication was prohibited for thirty years, though this restriction was lifted in 1949.

== Membership ==
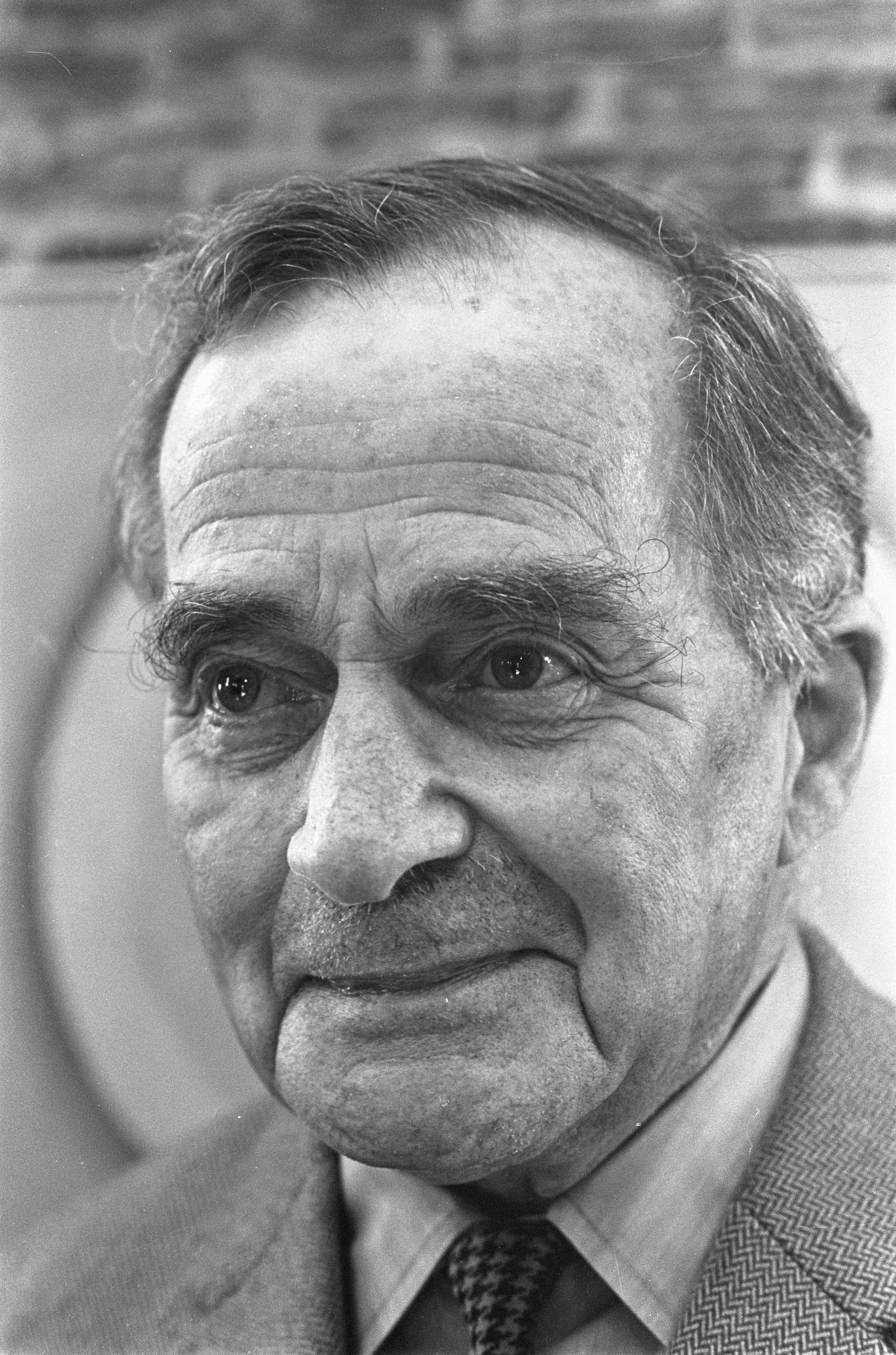
The poet Adriaan Roland Holst refused to join the Nederlandsche Kultuurkamer, writing that he would appreciate the chamber's disapproval.

Effective 1 April 1942, registration with the Nederlandsche Kultuurkamer was required for all persons and institutions involved in the arts; exemptions could be granted by the president of the chamber where the practice of art was incidental. As Jewish artists were excluded, and in compliance with Nazi eugenic policies, potential candidates were required to submit an Aryan certificate to prove their racial purity. By mid-year 26,000 artists had registered; this number increased to 42,000 by August 1944. Some of these registrants were collaborators, while others sought to safeguard their incomes and maintain hope during the occupation. Members ranged from prominent figures in their fields to organ grinders and pub owners.

Individual non-registrants found to be practising the arts would be subject to fines of up to 5,000 guilders or prosecution. Nonetheless, enforcement activities were limited, and several artists flouted the requirements. The poet Adriaan Roland Holst, when urged to register, refused to complete his Aryan certificate and wrote that the institution's disapproval would be greatly appreciated. The actor Adolphe Engers stopped performing, as did the songstress Jo Vincent, who gave her last performance of the war on 31 March 1942. Authors such as Antoon Coolen, Ferdinand Bordewijk, and Madelon Szekely-Lulofs refused to publish works during the occupation. A colony at Oost Castle in Eijsden, led by Jopie and Teun Roosenburg, smuggled Jews out of the Netherlands while trading art for food.

Institutions and organizations that became members of the Nederlandsche Kultuurkamer were required to bring their internal policies in line with those of the chamber. Members included the Federation of Dutch Musical Artists' Associations, the Association of Men of Letters, the Dutch Publishers' Union, the Association for the Promotion of the Interests of Book Trades, and the Dutch Booksellers' Union, all of which served as the basis of the guilds in their respective fields. Other organizations were incorporated into the chamber itself.

For organizations, failure to comply likewise carried penalties. Nonetheless, some refused to register with the Nederlandsche Kultuurkamer. When the Royal Harmonic of Maastricht refused to register with the chamber, arguing that it was "better to go down with honour than to continue to exist in doubt", (Note: Original: "... liever eervol ondergaan dan twijfelachtig blijven bestaan.") its assets – including its instruments and sheet music – were seized. Other organizations, such as the craft and industrial art community V.A.N.K, chose to disband rather than register.

== Works cited ==
- Amersfoort, Herman (2010). "Introduction". In Amersfoort, Herman; Kamphuis, Piet (eds.). May 1940: The Battle for the Netherlands. Brill. pp. 1–13. ISBN 978-90-04-18727-6.
- "De Koninklijke" [The Royal]. Veritas (in Dutch). Maastricht. 29 November 1944. p. 2.
- "De Eerste Algemeene Vergadering van het Persgilde" [The First General Meeting of the Press Guild]. De Gooi- en Eemlander (in Dutch). Deventer. 16 March 1943. p. 2.
- "De Organisatorische Opbouw der Nederlandsche Kultuurkamer" [The Organizational Structure of the Nederlandsche Kultuurkamer]. De Koerier (in Dutch). Deventer. 12 November 1942. p. 3.
- "Dolle Dinsdag" [Mad Tuesday] (in Dutch). Verzetsmuseum. Archived from the original on 8 August 2022.
- "Dr. T. (Tobie) Goedewaagen" (in Dutch). Parlementair Documentatie Centrum. Archived from the original on 10 January 2023.
- Evans, Richard J. (2005). The Third Reich in Power. Penguin. ISBN 978-0-14-303790-3.
- Foot, Richard; Bruin, Tabitha de (30 November 2023). "Liberation of the Netherlands". The Canadian Encyclopedia. Historica Canada. Archived from the original on 30 March 2024.
- "Het Lidmaatschap van de Kultuurkamer" [Membership in the Kultuurkamer]. De Gelderlander (in Dutch). Nijmegen. 20 March 1945. p. 1.
- "Instelling Nederlandsche Kultuurkamer" [Establishment of the Netherlands Chamber of Culture]. Het Nationale Dagblad (in Dutch). Leiden. 26 November 1941. p. 2.
- "Jhr.Mr. S.M.S. de Ranitz" (in Dutch). Parlementair Documentatie Centrum. Archived from the original on 27 January 2022.
- Kelder, J. J. (1983). Schrijven voor de Nieuwe Orde: Literatuur en Schrijverschap in De Schouw, Tijdschrift van de Kultuurkamer [Writing for the New Order: Literature and Writings in De Schouw, the Magazine of the Kultuurkamer] (in Dutch). HES.
- "Kitsch-Zaken Gesloten" [Kitsch Stores Closed]. Nieuwe Brabantsche Courant (in Dutch). 's-Hertogenbosch. 15 March 1944. p. 1.
- "Kultuurkamer – Kunst en Cultuur in de Tweede Wereldoorlog" [The Kultuurkamer – Art and Culture in the Second World War]. Historiek (in Dutch). 6 October 2022.
- "Kunst en Letteren: De Toekomst van het Tooneel" [Arts and Literature: The Future of the Stage]. Nijmeegsch Dagblad (in Dutch). Eindhoven. 6 January 1945. p. 8.
- Laudy, Yvonne (30 November 1991). "De Gongevaarlijke 'Gekken' van Kasteel Oost" [The Harmless 'Madmen' of Oost Castle]. De Telegraaf (in Dutch). Amsterdam. p. 25.
- Lewin, Lisette (1983). Het Clandestiene Boek 1940–1945 [The Clandestine Books, 1940–1945]. Van Gennep. ISBN 9789060125502.
- "Mr. H. Reydon Overleden" [Mr. H. Reydon Dies]. Nieuwsblad van het Noorden (in Dutch). Groningen. 25 August 1943. p. 1.
- "Na Drie Jaren" [After Three Years]. De Vrije Kunstenaar (in Dutch). Amsterdam. 1 April 1945. pp. 1–3.
- "Ned. Kultuurkamer en Kultuurraad" [Chamber of Culture and Council of Culture of the Netherlands]. Dagblad van het Zuiden voor Eindhoven, Meierĳ, Peel en Kempenland (in Dutch). Eindhoven. 27 November 1941. p. 3.
- Strupp, Christoph (30 January 2013). "'Only a Phase': How Diplomats Misjudged Hitler's Rise". Der Spiegel. Archived from the original on 24 February 2013.
- "V.A.N.K. Nederlanse Vereniging voor Ambachts- en Nijverheidskunst" [V.A.N.K. Dutch Association for Craft and Industrial Art]. ARTindex Lexicon (in Dutch). Archived from the original on 9 August 2020.
- "Vereffenaar der Kultuurkamer Benoemd" [Liquidator of the Kultuurkamer Appointed]. De Rotterdammer (in Dutch). Rotterdam. 9 August 1945. p. 2.
- "Waarom een Nederlandsche Kultuurkamer?" [Why a Netherlands Chamber of Culture?]. Dagblad voor Noord-Holland (in Dutch). Alkmaar. 14 October 1942. p. 3.
- Wesselink, Claartje (2014). Kunstenaars van de Kultuurkamer: Geschiedenis en Herinnering [Artists of the Kultuurkamer: History and Memory]. Bert Baker. ISBN 9789035140615.
