= Tobie Goedewaagen =

Dutch philosopher and politician (1895–1980)

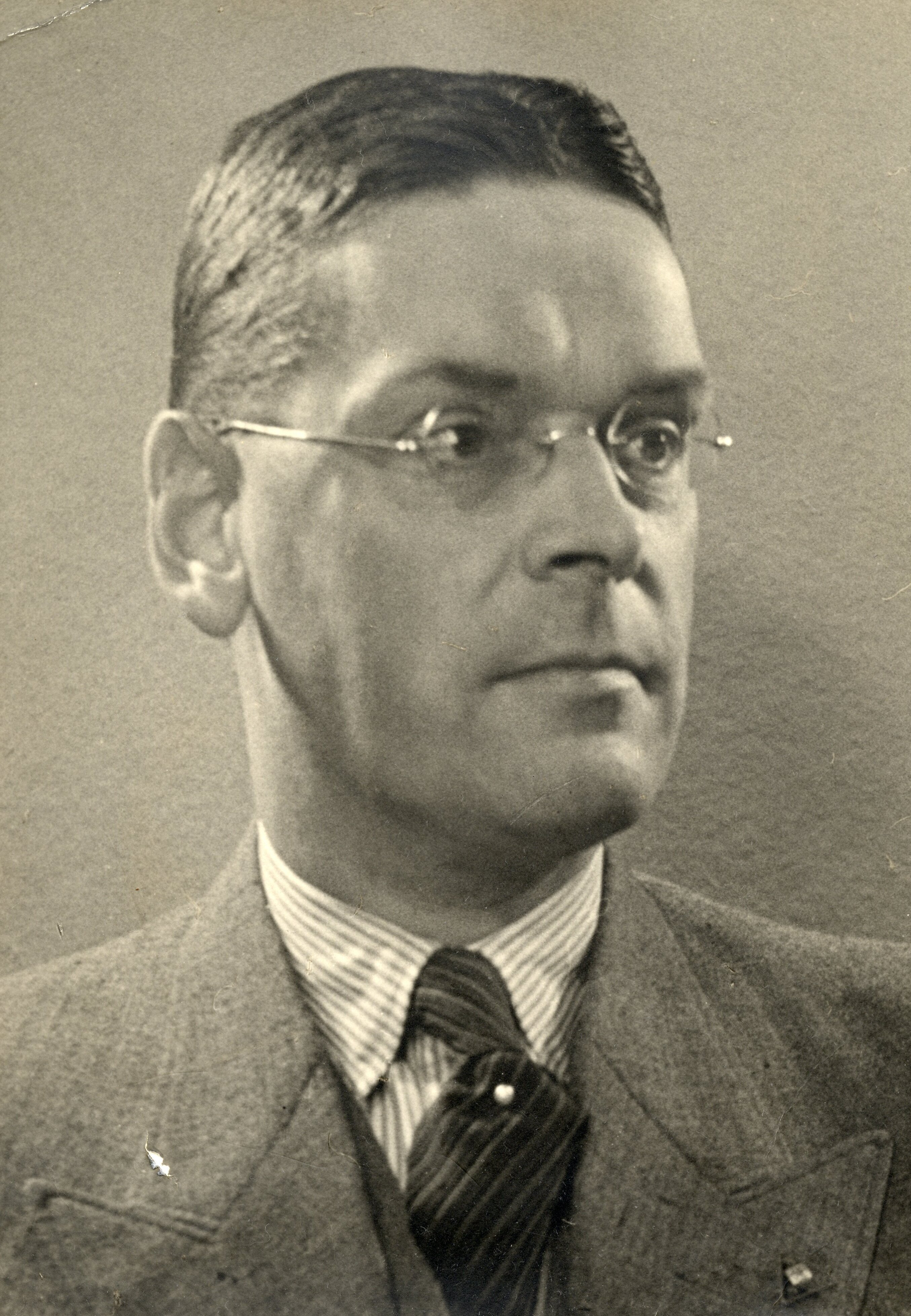
- Goedewaagen in 1941

Secretary General of the Department of Public Information and the Arts
- In office 28 November 1940 – 28 January 1943
- Preceded by: Office created
- Succeeded by: Hermannus Reydon

Personal details
- Born: 15 March 1895 Amsterdam, Netherlands
- Died: 4 January 1980 (aged 84) The Hague, Netherlands
- Party: National Socialist Movement in the Netherlands (1936–1945); Alliance for National Reconstruction (1933–1936)
- Spouse(s): Anna Bertha de Roos (m. 1919; div. 1928) Geertruida Hendrika Johanna Vruink (m. 1930)
- Children: 2
- Occupation: Academic, politician

Academic background
- Education: Utrecht University
- Thesis: De logische rechtvaardiging der zedelijkheid bij Fichte, Schelling en Hegel (1923)

Tobie Goedewaagen (15 March 1895 – 4 January 1980) was a Dutch philosopher and politician. He served as the first secretary general of the Department of Public Information and the Arts, an institution established by the Nazi German occupation government, and led the Nederlandsche Kultuurkamer (Netherlands Chamber of Culture) that had been established by the regime.

The son of a banker, Goedewaagen studied philosophy at Utrecht University, receiving his doctorate in 1923. He was teaching as a private lecturer two years later, focusing on post-Kantian philosophy. After he was refused a professorship in 1932, he began reading about Nazi eugenics and became a fervent anti-Semite. He contributed to the publications of the National Socialist Movement in the Netherlands (NSB) and joined the party. Goedewaagen's work with the press was recognized by Austrian Nazi reichskommissar Arthur Seyss-Inquart, resulting in his appointment as secretary general in November 1940.

Goedewaagen sought to Nazify the press and enable political control of the arts. However, after coming into conflict with NSB chairman Anton Mussert, he was dismissed from the party and left his station. Appointed professor of philosophy at Utrecht University by the regime, Goedewaagen fled the Netherlands in 1944 for Germany. He was arrested in 1946, extradited to the Netherlands, tried, and sentenced in 1948 to twelve years' imprisonment. After receiving amnesty in 1952, Goedewaagen worked as a private tutor and published several works pseudonymously.

== Early life ==
Goedewaagen was born in Amsterdam on 15 March 1895. He was the elder of two sons born to the banker Cornelis Tobie Goedewaagen, the founder of the Incasso Bank, and Anna Bakker. Tobie had a comfortable upbringing, completing his studies in Utrecht and Hilversum. After finishing secondary school, he attempted to study Dutch literature in Amsterdam and published in De Gids. Later, he spent time in Blaricum, where he networked with artists. In his biography, Goedewaagen described the period between 1918 and 1921 as his "Sturm und Drang years", wherein he sought answers and received disappointment.

Ultimately, Goedewaagen was dissatisfied with literature. Having received an introduction to the teachings of Baruch Spinoza through his mother and her friend Johannes Diderik Bierens de Haan, he transferred to Utrecht University. There, he studied philosophy under Bernard Jan Hendrik Ovink, as well as the classical languages. In 1923, Goedewaagen defended his doctoral thesis, De logische rechtvaardiging der zedelijkheid bij Fichte, Schelling en Hegel (The Logical Justification of Morality by Fichte, Schelling, and Hegel), and graduated with honours. In later years, he expanded his writings to include the works of Friedrich Nietzsche.

Within two years, Goedewaagen was delivering private lectures on post-Kantian philosophy at Utrecht University; he delivered his first public lecture on philosophy and worldviews on 8 October 1925. During this period, he established the Society for Critical Philosophy and, in 1931, became editor of the Tijdschrift voor Wijsbegeerte (later ANTW). He was a candidate for Utrecht University's philosophy professorship when Ovink stepped down in 1932, but not appointed.

Goedewaagen began developing an interest in politics, and through his friend P. H. Ritter, became closer to anti-democratic groups in the Netherlands in the 1920s. Believing that the Netherlands was in a decline, he joined the Alliance for National Reconstruction in 1933. Through his readings, he became familiar with the eugenics practised in Nazi Germany, and became a fervent anti-Semite. He came to see the rise of national socialism, as well as the rejection of egalitarian humanism, as justified by Hegelian philosophy. Goedewaagen met with Anton Mussert, the leader of the National Socialist Movement in the Netherlands (NSB), in 1936, and in 1938 he travelled through Nazi Germany with Robert van Genechten to learn from the Nazi institutions.

In line with these beliefs, in 1937 Goedewaagen stepped down from the editorial board of the ANTW and resigned from the Society for Critical Philosophy. Instead, he began contributing to the Nieuw-Nederland, an NSB publication. By 1938, he had begun working with the weekly magazine De Waag. (Note: Groeneveld (2013) writes that he was an editor, while Berkel (2013, p. 127) describes him as working freelance.) He was made editor-in-chief in early May 1940. Two days after Germany invaded the Netherlands on 10 May, Goedewaagen was arrested by the Dutch.

== Nazi occupation ==
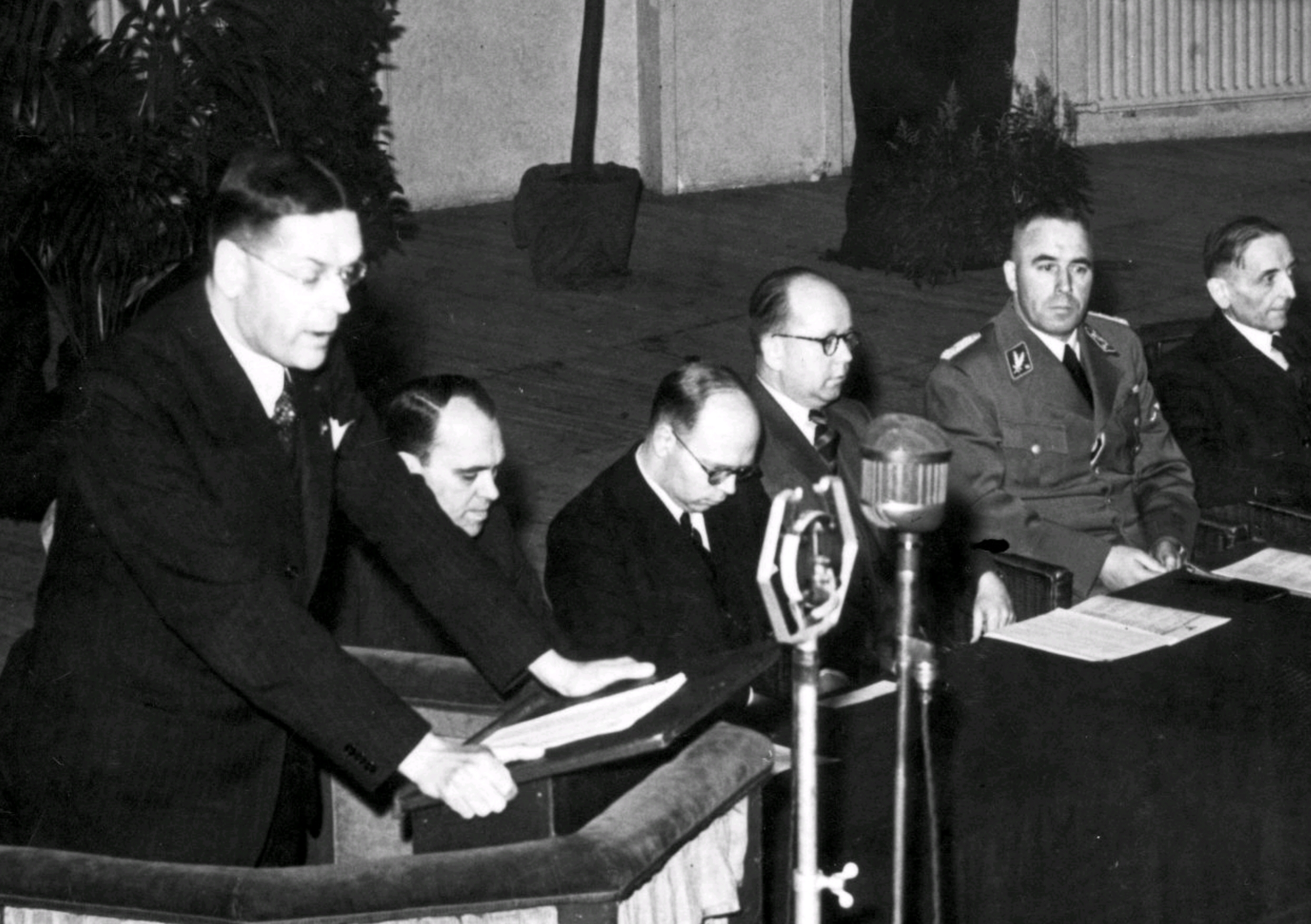
Goedewaagen (far left) speaking at a 1941 meeting of the Association of Dutch Journalists

The Dutch government capitulated to the Germans later that month. According to Goedewaagen, he joined the NSB in June 1940, shortly after being released from prison by the German occupation government. (Note: In his biography, Berkel (2013, p. 107) writes that Goedewaagen had actually joined the NSB in 1936 and concealed his membership.) In September, he was entrusted with the party's press affairs; by this point, he had already served the occupation government by organizing the Information Council for the Dutch Press and the Association of Dutch Journalists. Although Goedewaagen was dismissed by more senior members of the NSB, his efforts to nazify the press were recognized by Arthur Seyss-Inquart, the Austrian Nazi reichskommissar for the occupied Netherlands. Consequently, on 28 November of that year, he was made the first secretary general of the new Department of Public Information and the Arts that had been established by the Nazi regime.

As secretary general, Goedewaagen became the first president of the Nederlandsche Kultuurkamer (Netherlands Chamber of Culture) when that institution was established by the Nazi regime on 25 November 1941. He attempted to entice artists to register by creating new prizes and increasing the salaries afforded to performers. He sponsored several exhibitions, seeking to promote Dutch culture "in the light of its responsibility towards the national community". (Note: Original: "... de Nederlandsche kultuur in het licht van haar verantwoordelijkheid tegenover de volksgemeenschap te bevorderen.") At the same time, however, he enforced the belief that "blood determines everything". (Note: Original: "Het bloed bepaalt alles.") The chamber required candidates to submit an Aryan certificate to prove their racial purity, and Goedewaagen vigorously promoted the elimination of Jewish artists and the banning of works produced by them. Between the politicization of art and the chamber's racial policies, Goedewaagen thus faced heavy resistance from artists, even with compulsory registration.

Goedewaagen was expelled from the NSB in mid-1942. In his memoirs, Goedewaagen attributed this dismissal to conflict with Mussert over the department's approach to propaganda. Feeling that the secretary-general failed to follow the example set by Nazi Germany's chief propagandist Joseph Goebbels, Mussert had arranged in 1942 for Ernst Voorhoeve to lead the propaganda division of the Department of Public Information and the Arts. Goedewaagen attempted to get Voorhoeve to swear he would follow the secretary-general's direction, but this did not happen. In his biography of Goedewaagen, meanwhile, Benien van Berkel links Gooedewaagen's downfall to controversy surrounding his firing of Jan de Weille, who subsequently brought complaints of mismanagement and embezzlement to Mussert. This exacerbated the already tense relationship between the two, which was further complicated by Voorhoeve's political manoeuvrings and rise to power. Ultimately, Goedewaagen was ordered to report to a disciplinary board, and he refused.

On 28 January 1943, Goedewaagen left his position. (Note: Sources differ as to the means of his departure. Groeneveld (2013) writes that he resigned. Meanwhile, Berkel (2013, pp. 322–324) describes Goedewaagen as being dismissed by Seyss-Inquart, with the dismissal being announced as a resignation.) Amid rumours that his children were non-Aryan, spread by the NSB, Goedewaagen was appointed to Utrecht University as professor of philosophy. There, he was received coolly by the faculty and ignored by his colleagues. He delivered lectures on theoretical philosophy and the history of philosophy and psychology, with subjects including Heraclitus, the Eleatics, and Kantian ethics. Students were scarce, with many potential candidates refusing to complete the declaration of loyalty required for enrolment. Goedewaagen published extensively during this period.

== Later life ==
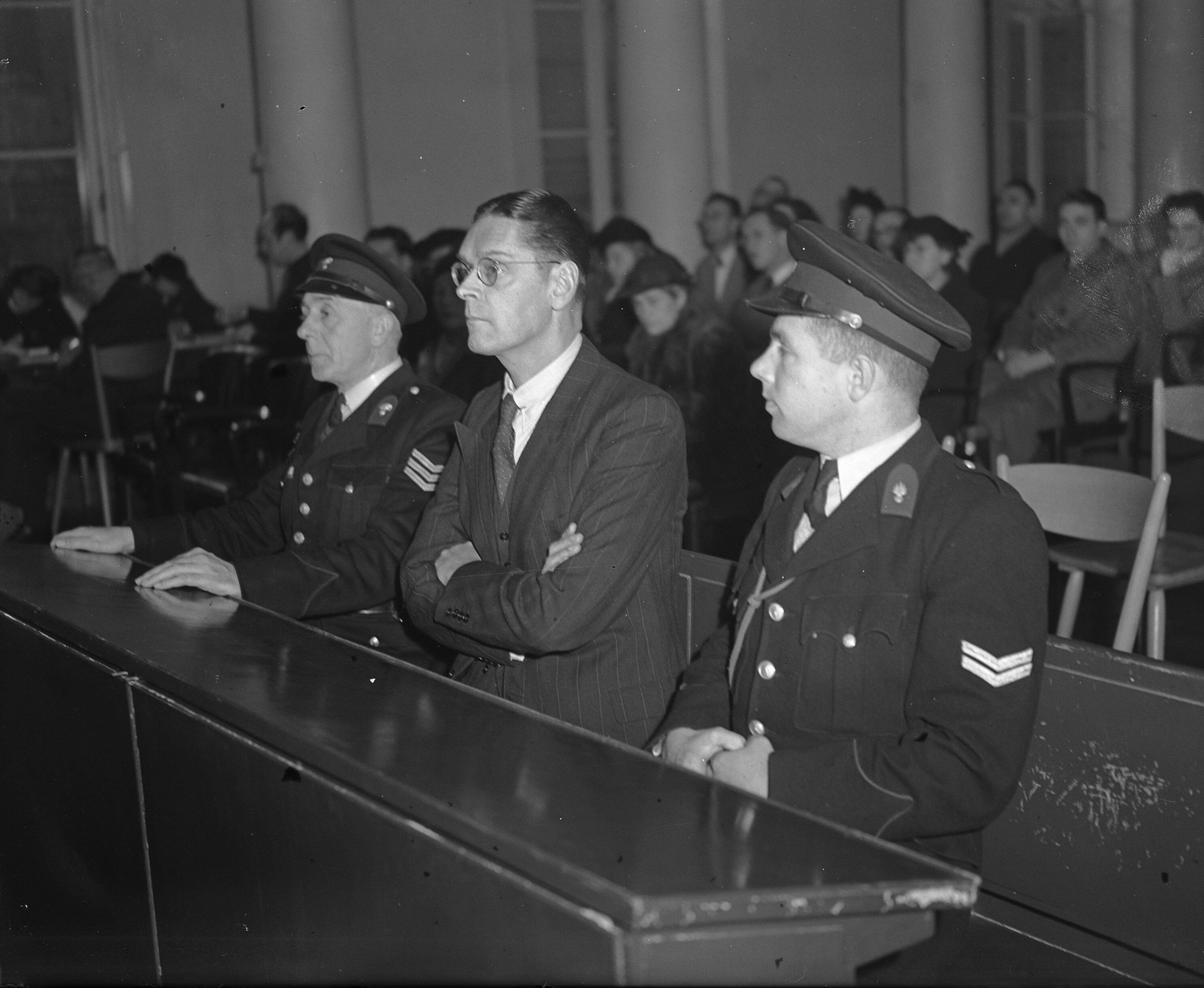
Goedewaagen (centre) on trial, 1948

On 5 September 1944, after broadcasts alleged that Breda had been liberated by Allied forces, Goedewaagen was spotted at Utrecht station with his family, his possessions wrapped in a bedspread hung on his back. They fled for Germany, and Goedewaagen earned a research degree from Berlin University. With the end of the Second World War, however, he was unable to escape the repercussions of his actions, and he was arrested by the British on 29 May 1946 in Löhne in Westphalia. His professorship in Utrecht had been revoked the previous year.

Goedewaagen was held for four days, then extradited to the Netherlands. Awaiting trial, he wrote about Johann Wolfgang von Goethe and his Faust; he also began working on his memoirs. His trial by the Special Court of Justice began on 1 December 1946, with prosecutor Frans van Voorst tot Voorst demanding fifteen years' imprisonment for Goedewaagen, whom he denounced as a "first-class know-it-all who would never have advanced in normal times". (Note: Original "... een betweter eersteklas, die in normale tijden geen voet aan de grond zou hebben gekregen".) In his defence against charges that he had mandated the viewing of propaganda films, pressured media companies to publish images, and dissolved broadcasting associations, Goedewaagen argued that he had taken his wartime actions to prevent a greater calamity. At the same time, Het Binnenhof reported that appeared to remain supportive of NSB.

On 15 December 1948, Goedewaagen was sentenced to twelve years' imprisonment, minus time served, and was stripped of his right to vote and hold office. He served less than four years, being released on 17 April 1952 as part of a broader amnesty policy. Banned from journalistic activities until 1965, Goedewaagen considered emigrating to Germany, viewing life in the Netherlands as too unpleasant. In 1956, he became a private tutor at the Vermazen Institute in The Hague; this quashed any intents to emigrate. He also published several works pseudonymously, including a German-language introduction to the Netherlands under the name Theodor Meursen in 1956.

Through the 1960s, Goedewaagen travelled extensively as a lecturer, delivering talks to organizations such as the German Cultural Foundation of the European Spirit, the Sigrid Hunke Foundation, and the Freie Akademie. In these lectures, he continued to espouse Nazi views to audiences with Nazi leanings, though reframed as purely theoretical. Due to his continued propagation of Nazi philosophy, Goedewaagen could not readily find opportunities at mainstream lectures. Only in 1971 was he contracted by a mainstream publisher to write about Hegel.

In 1970, Goedewaagen became sickly, limiting his ability to travel, and the following year he spent six months at the Preva Rehabilitation Centre. Though diagnosed with muscular dystrophy in 1973, he still remained active in Nazi activities in the Netherlands and wrote for the magazine of the De Wende Historical Society—an organization established by former Waffen-SS member Teunis Schaap. Goodewaagen began to withdraw from social activities in 1975, and lived in a series of boarding houses through the end of the decade. He died in The Hague on 4 January 1980.

== Family ==
Goedewaagen was married twice. On 10 June 1919, he married Anna Bertha de Roos, with whom he had a son and a daughter. The couple divorced on 20 December 1928. On 19 June 1930, Goedewaagen married Geertruida Hendrika Johanna Vruink. His son Tobie became a poet, with several works published in Maatstaf. In a 1970 letter, the younger Goedewaagen wrote that his father disapproved of his poems, claiming that they were too negative or failed to adhere to classical standards.

== Selected publications ==
- Goedewaagen, T. (1931). Summa Contra Metaphysicos: Einfuehrung Zum System Der Philosophie [Summa Contra Metaphysicos: On the Philosophical System] (in Dutch). Leiden: Genootschap voor Critische Filosofie.
- Goedewaagen, T. (1933). Nietzsche (in Dutch). s' Gravenhage: Kruseman.
- Goedewaagen, T. (1941). Passer en Speer: Cultuurpolitieke Redevoeringe [Compass and Spear: Speeches on Cultural Politics] (in Dutch). s' Gravenhage: De Schouw. (in two volumes)

== Works cited ==
- Berkel, Benien van (2013). Tobie Goedewaagen (1895–1980): Een Onverbeterlijke Nationaalsocialist [Tobie Goedewaagen (1895–1980): An Incorrigible National Socialist] (PDF) (in Dutch). De Bezige Bij. ISBN 978-90-234-7639-9.
- "Dolle Dinsdag" [Mad Tuesday] (in Dutch). Verzetsmuseum. Archived from the original on 8 August 2022.
- "Dr. T. (Tobie) Goedewaagen" (in Dutch). Parlementair Documentatie Centrum. Archived from the original on 10 January 2023.
- "Fikkie". Het Vrije Volk (in Dutch). Rotterdam. 24 August 1970. p. 2.
- "Goedewaagen wilde zich plaatsen tussen bezetter en volk" [Goedewaagen Wanted to Place Himself Between the Occupier and People]. Het Binnenhof (in Dutch). The Hague. 1 December 1948. pp. 1–2.
- Groeneveld, EG (2013). "Goedewaagen, Tobie (1895–1980)". Biografisch Woordenboek van Nederland (in Dutch). Huygens Institute for the History of the Netherlands. Archived from the original on 29 September 2022.
- "Instelling Nederlandsche Kultuurkamer" [Establishment of the Netherlands Chamber of Culture]. Het Nationale Dagblad (in Dutch). Leiden. 26 November 1941. p. 2.
- "Kultuurkamer – Kunst en Cultuur in de Tweede Wereldoorlog" [The Kultuurkamer – Art and Culture in the Second World War]. Historiek (in Dutch). 6 October 2022.
- Lewin, Lisette (1983). Het Clandestiene Boek 1940–1945 [The Clandestine Books, 1940–1945]. Van Gennep. ISBN 9789060125502.
- "Personalia" [Personal]. Trouw (in Dutch). Meppel. 11 January 1980. p. 17.
- "Tobie Goedewaagen". Traces of War (in Dutch). STIWOT. Archived from the original on 13 June 2024.
- "Twaalf Jaar voor Goedewaagen" [Twelve Years for Goedewaagen]. Nieuwsblad van Friesland: Hepkema's Courant (in Dutch). Heerenveen. 15 December 1948. p. 1.
- "Volksvoorlichting als Onderdeel van de Staatstaak" [Public Information as a State Task]. Arnhemsche Courant (in Dutch). Arnhem. 28 November 1940. p. 7.
- "Vijftien jaar geëist tegen Goedewaagen" [Fifteen Years Demanded for Goedewaagen]. Het Parool (in Dutch). Amsterdam. 2 December 1948. p. 3.
