= Ed Gerdes =

Dutch painter

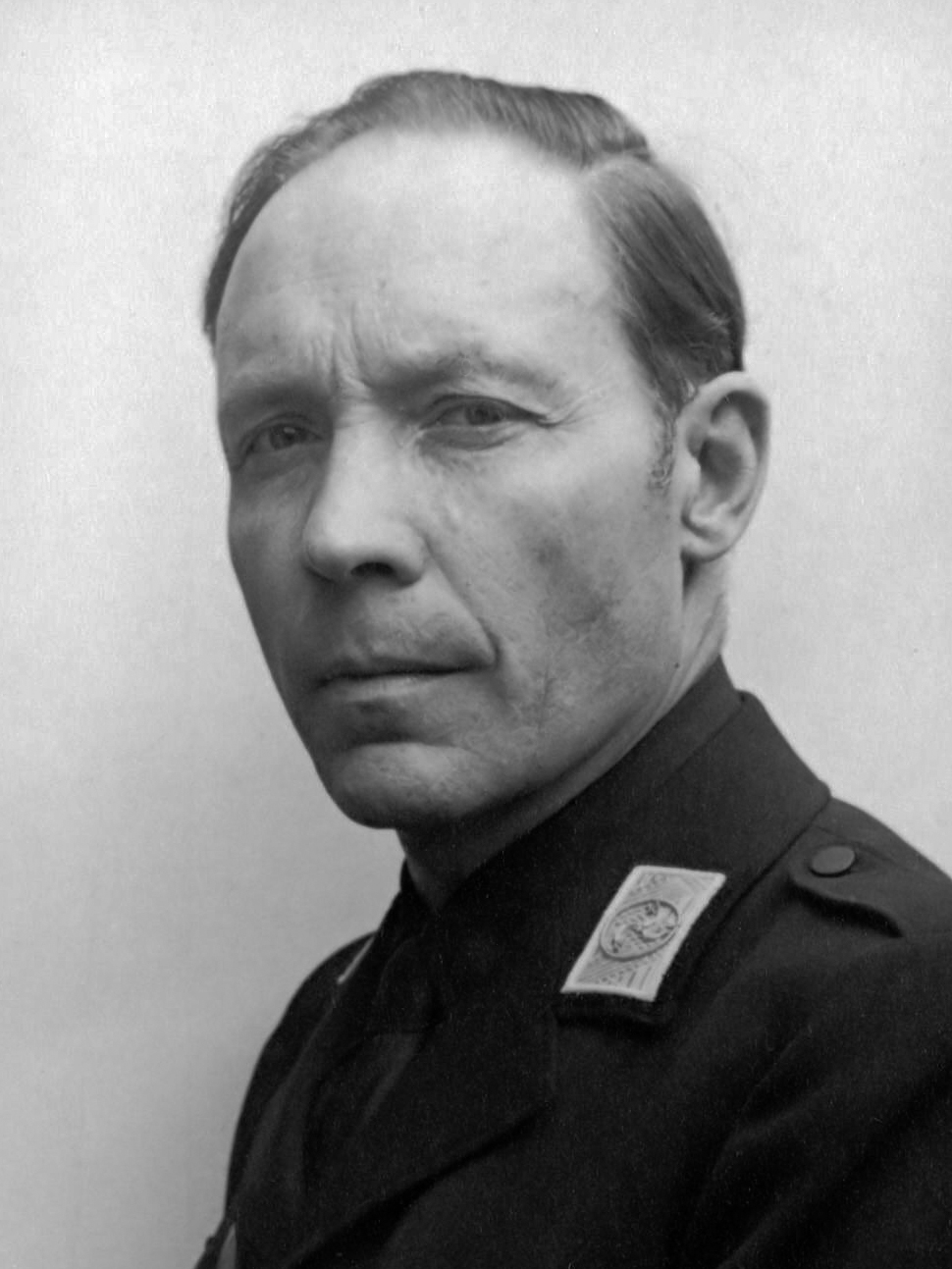
- Ed Gerdes
- Born: 3 January 1887; Amsterdam
- Died: 10 May 1945 (aged 58); The Hague
- Occupations: Dutch painter and art teacher

Ed Gerdes or Eduard Gerdes (1887–1945) was a Dutch painter, art teacher, member of honorary art selection committees and during the last years of his life head of the visual arts guild at the Nederlandsche Kultuurkamer.

== Life ==
Gerdes was born in Amsterdam and became a pupil of Franz Deutmann. He is known for copies of old masters, portraits, still lifes and landscapes. In 1905 he became a member of Arti et Amicitiae. in 1908 a member of Vereeniging Sint Lucas and in 1910 he won the Willink van Collenprijs. In 1911 he married Adèle, the daughter of the then minister of internal affairs, Theo Heemskerk. A successful artist, he was friends with Han van Meegeren and from the 1920s began to sit on various art jury committees. In 1921 his daughter Sacha was born, who later became a model and an artist herself. His work was also part of the art competitions at the 1924 Summer Olympics, the 1928 Summer Olympics, and the 1936 Summer Olympics. His work was also included in the 1939 exhibition and sale Onze Kunst van Heden (Our Art of Today) at the Rijksmuseum in Amsterdam.

In 1930 he divorced and in 1933 he became a member of the NSB (the National Socialist Movement in the Netherlands). In 1941 he was selected by Tobie Goedewaagen to be the director of the Gilde voor Bouwkunst, Beeldende Kunsten en Kunstambacht, the part of the Nederlandsche Kultuurkamer that concerned the visual arts. The Kultuurkamer was opened in The Hague in 1942 as the local subdivision of the governmental agency Reichskulturkammer and only artists who were members were allowed to sell their art. It was closed to Jews and many artists refused membership, though not so much out of solidarity with their Jewish colleagues, but out of a firm belief that art had no place in the political arena and could not be judged by government employees. Gerdes became officially a government administrator, but his daughter had already broken with him in 1939 definitively by that point on political grounds.

Gerdes died in The Hague soon after the war ended in the hospital while being treated for blood poisoning.

== Works ==
His work is considered "daderkunst", or criminal art, based on his political career in the Kultuurkamer, but as the exhibition "Goed/Fout" in 2015 pointed out, all of his purchases for the Kultuurkamer were apolitical, generally still life paintings and landscapes. He was an admirer of Van Gogh, but painted in a more realistic style. Though he was prolific in his younger years, only his copies of old masters seem to have value on the art market today.
