= Nederlandse Landwacht =

Dutch parliamentary organization

The Nederlandse Landwacht was a Dutch paramilitary organization founded by the German occupation forces in the Netherlands on November 12, 1943. It should not be confused with the military volunteer corps 'Landwacht Nederland', which was established in March 1943 and renamed Landstorm Nederland in October, and which became part of the Waffen-SS.

== Characteristics and conduct ==
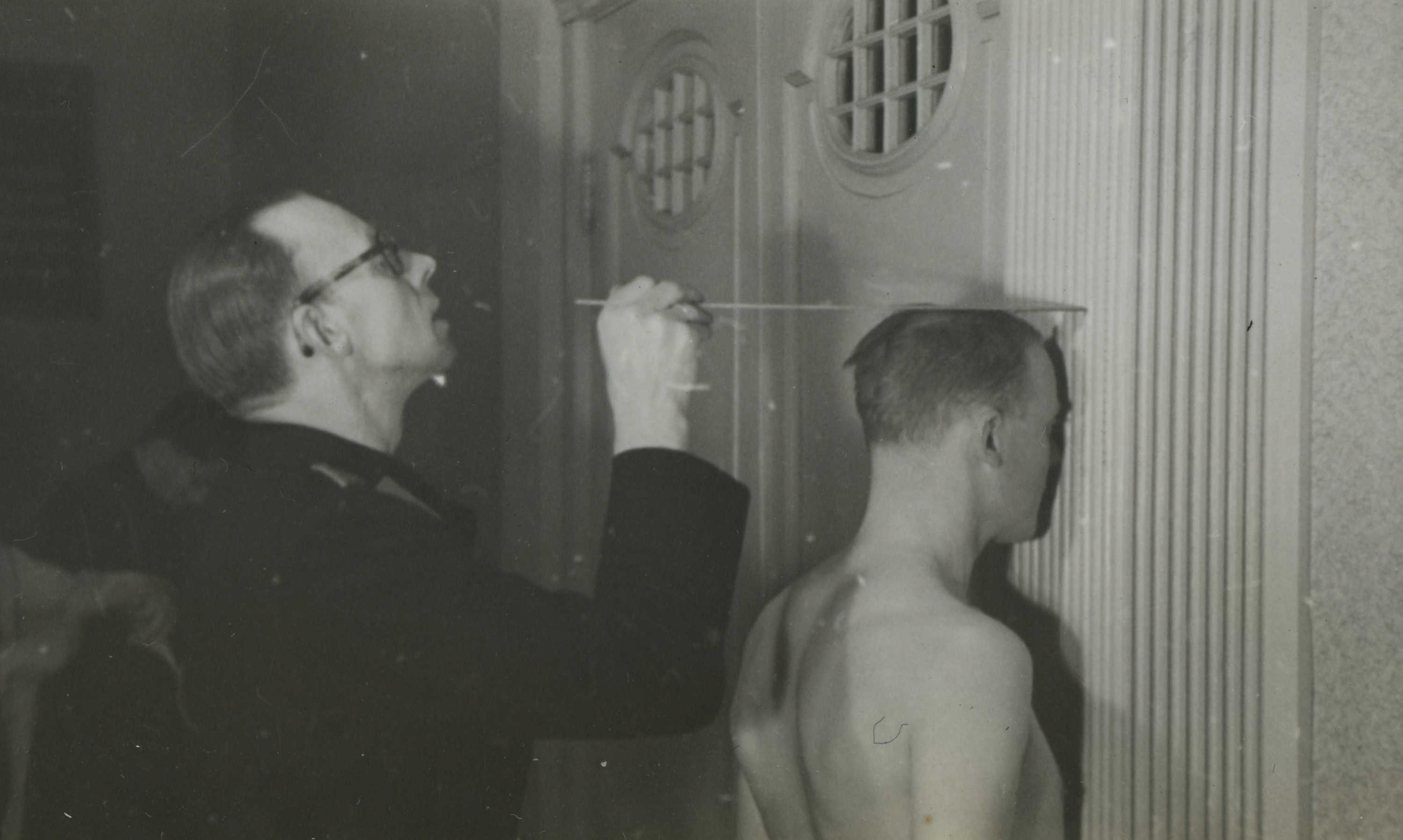
Landwacht recruit intake (Amsterdam, 28 February 1944).

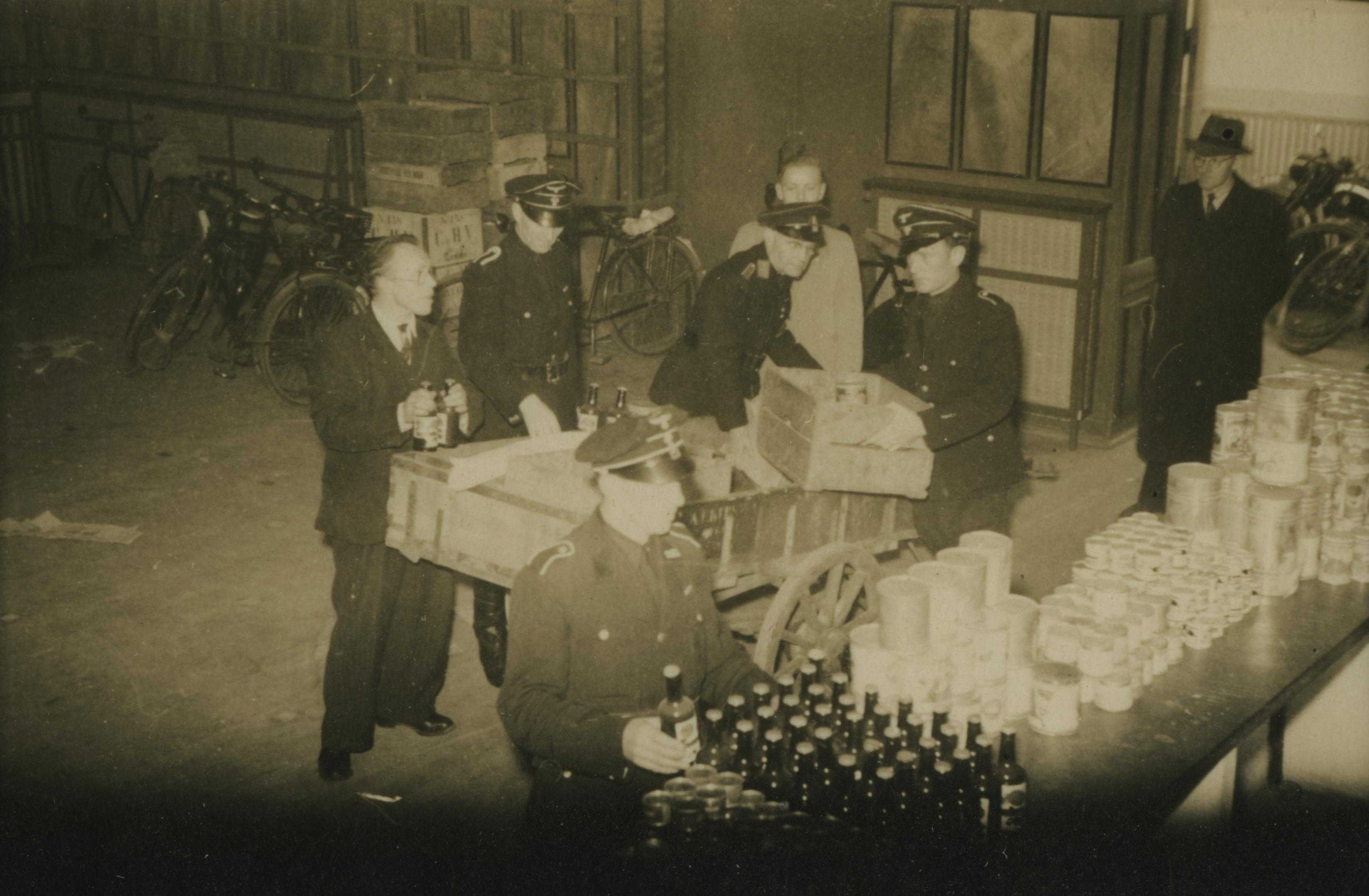
Landwachters seizing canned vegetables (9 June 1944).

The Landwacht was first seen on the street in March 1944. The Landwacht mostly was made up of Dutch National Socialist movement (NSB) members equipped with shotguns. The populace nicknamed them the "Jan-Hagel", Dutch slang for a rabble but also related to the Dutch word for a shotgun (hagelgeweer). The Landwacht was mainly used to guard buildings, check identity cards, and carry out arrests, house searches, and raids. They did not wear a uniform initially, but were identified by a red bracelet.

The Landwacht was feared and hated by the population, among other things because during the Hongerwinter, the Dutch famine in the winter of 1944–45, the Landwacht confiscated food parcels from Dutch civilians. Many thousands of Dutch people had traveled hundreds of kilometers to obtain bread or some potatoes. On 27 March 1945 the illegal Het Parool newspaper devoted an article to the Landwacht's many arrests and executions. Het Parool opined that the Landwachters deserved execution once liberation came.

== Uniforms ==
Members of the Landwacht generally wore the black NSB party uniforms: black shirts, black trousers or riding breeches, black leather motorcycle or riding boots, and a black leather belt with matching carrying strap. Depending on the weather, a black tunic or black overcoat could be worn. Though the Landwacht were poorly armed, black pistol holsters were sometimes carried.

== Organization ==
Kees van Geelkerken, the second-ranked official in the NSB, was appointed Inspector General of the Landwacht by Arthur Seyss-Inquart in November 1943. After 5 September 1944 the Landwacht fell directly under Hanns Albin Rauter, the highest SS and police leader in the occupied Netherlands. After Rauter was severely wounded by the Dutch resistance in March 1945, German SD leader Karl Eberhard Schöngarth became his deputy.

The Voluntary Auxiliary Police was merged with the Landwacht after Dolle Dinsdag, 5 September 1944, when celebrations were prompted after broadcasts claimed that Breda, in occupied Netherlands, had been liberated by Allied forces.

The Landwacht's headquarters was located in Villa Bloemenheuvel, at 23-25 Hoofdstraat in Driebergen.

== Regional organization of the Landwacht ==
Name	Region	Commander
Stormban I	South Holland and Zeeland	H.A.M. van der Heijden (NSB)
Stormban II	North Holland and Utrecht	W. Slob (NSB)
Stormban III	Groningen, Friesland and Drenthe	T.J.S. van Efferen (Germanic SS)
Stormban IV	Gelderland and Overijssel	N.J. Alblas (NSB)
Stormban V	North Brabant and Limburg	V G. Rollema (Germanic SS)

After the war, three former Landwachters, Gerard Rollema (1915), Gerrit Sanner (1909) and Dirk Eijkelboom (1895) were sentenced to death.
