= Nationale Jeugdstorm =

Dutch Nazi youth movement

National Youth Storm Nationale Jeugdstorm (NJS)/Vereniging Nationale Jeugdstorm (VNJ)
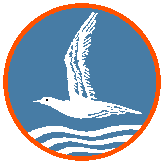
- Leader: Cornelis van Geelkerken
- Founded: May 1, 1934 (NJS); February 1, 1936 (VNJ)
- Dissolved: February 1, 1936 (NJS); 1945 (VNJ)
- Headquarters: Utrecht, Netherlands
- Ideology: Fascism; Nazism
- Mother party: National Socialist Movement in the Netherlands

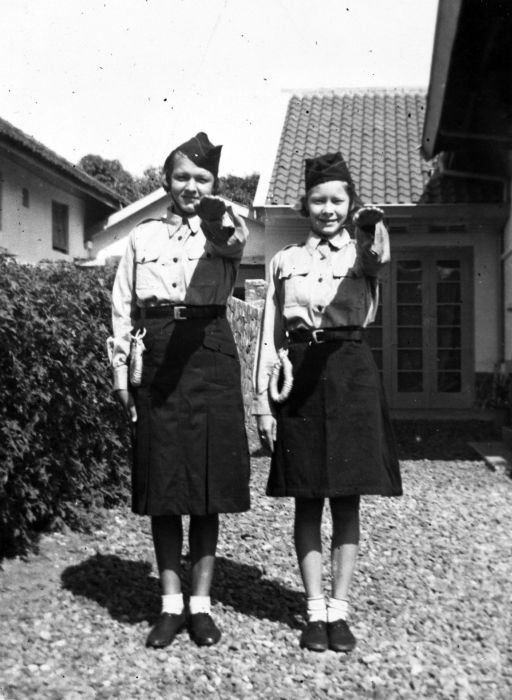
Girls of the Nationale Jeugdstorm in Dutch East Indies, 1937, Tropenmuseum.

The Nationale Jeugdstorm (English: National Youth Storm; NJS) was a Dutch youth movement associated with the National Socialist Movement in the Netherlands (NSB) that existed from 1934 to 1945, organized as the Dutch equivalent of the German Hitlerjugend and as a Nazi counterpart of Scouting and Guiding in the Netherlands.

== Formation ==
The organization was formally separate, but had very close links with the NSB. The director was the leading NSB member Cornelis van Geelkerken. On May 1, 1934, Van Geelkerken was dismissed as a government official because NSB membership was deemed incompatible with employment with the government. On that same day, he founded the Nationale Jeugdstorm. On February 1, 1936, the Nationale Jeugdstorm was shut down as a result of a Supreme Court ruling. An immediate restructuring followed, with a new 'democratic' organisation and a small name change (Vereniging Nationale Jeugdstorm, VNJ). Soon after the German invasion, the old name was re-adopted.

Nearly all members of the Nationale Jeugdstorm were children of NSB members. Before the occupation, the Nationale Jeugdstorm had around 2,000 members; a number that increased during World War II to over 12,000. Members were between 10 and 17 years old, and had to be Dutch. The members called meeuwen (seagulls) and meeuwkes (gulls) (10–13 years) and stormers and stormsters (stormers) (14–17 years). Boys and girls formed separate groups within the organization. When they became 18, the boys were conscripted to the Nederlandse Arbeidsdienst (Dutch Labour Service) (NAD) or the Waffen SS.

== Jeugdstorm emblems and insignia ==
Book plates from Distinctieven der Beweging featuring emblems, paramilitary uniforms, rank insignia, Pennants, etc. of the Jeugdstorm.

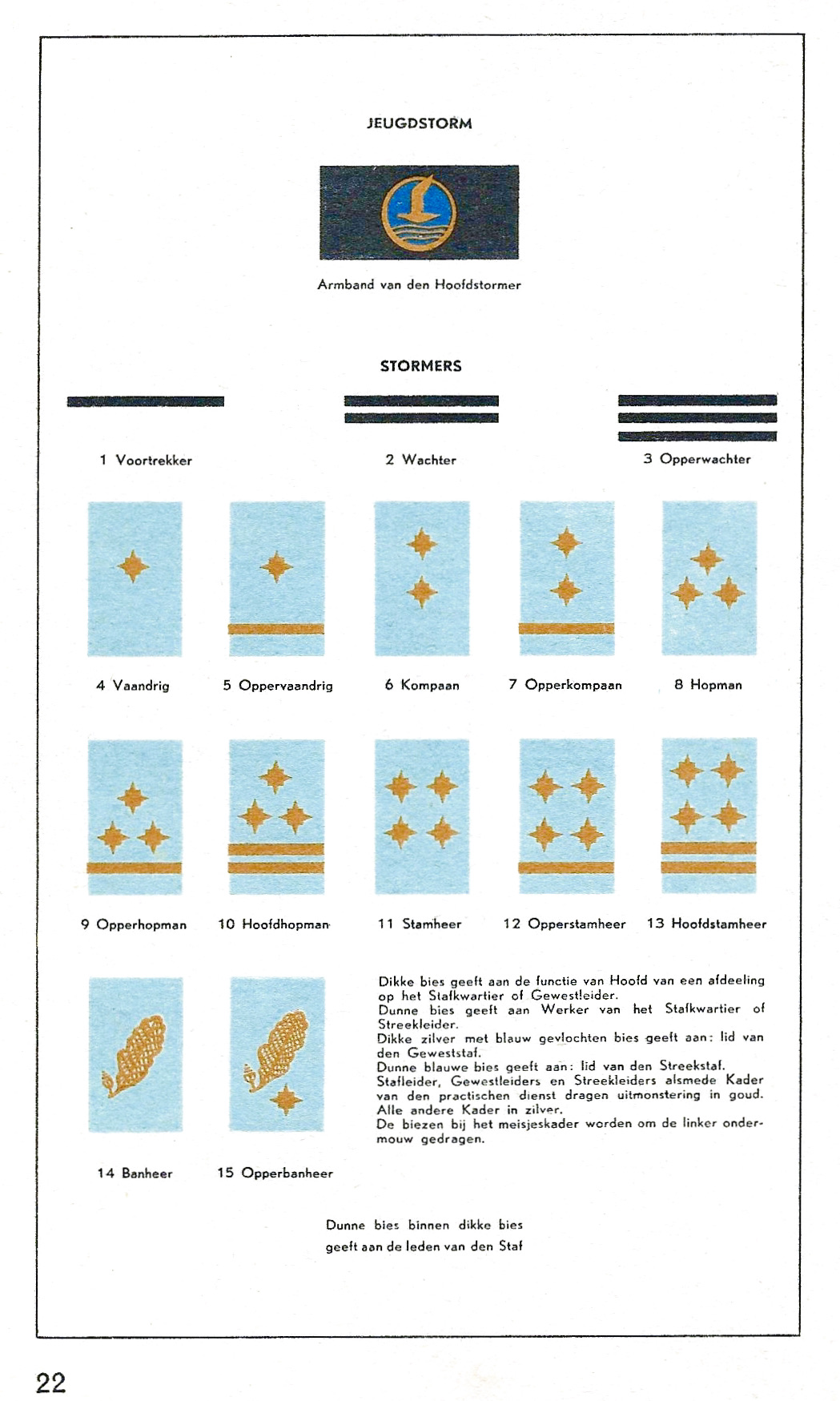

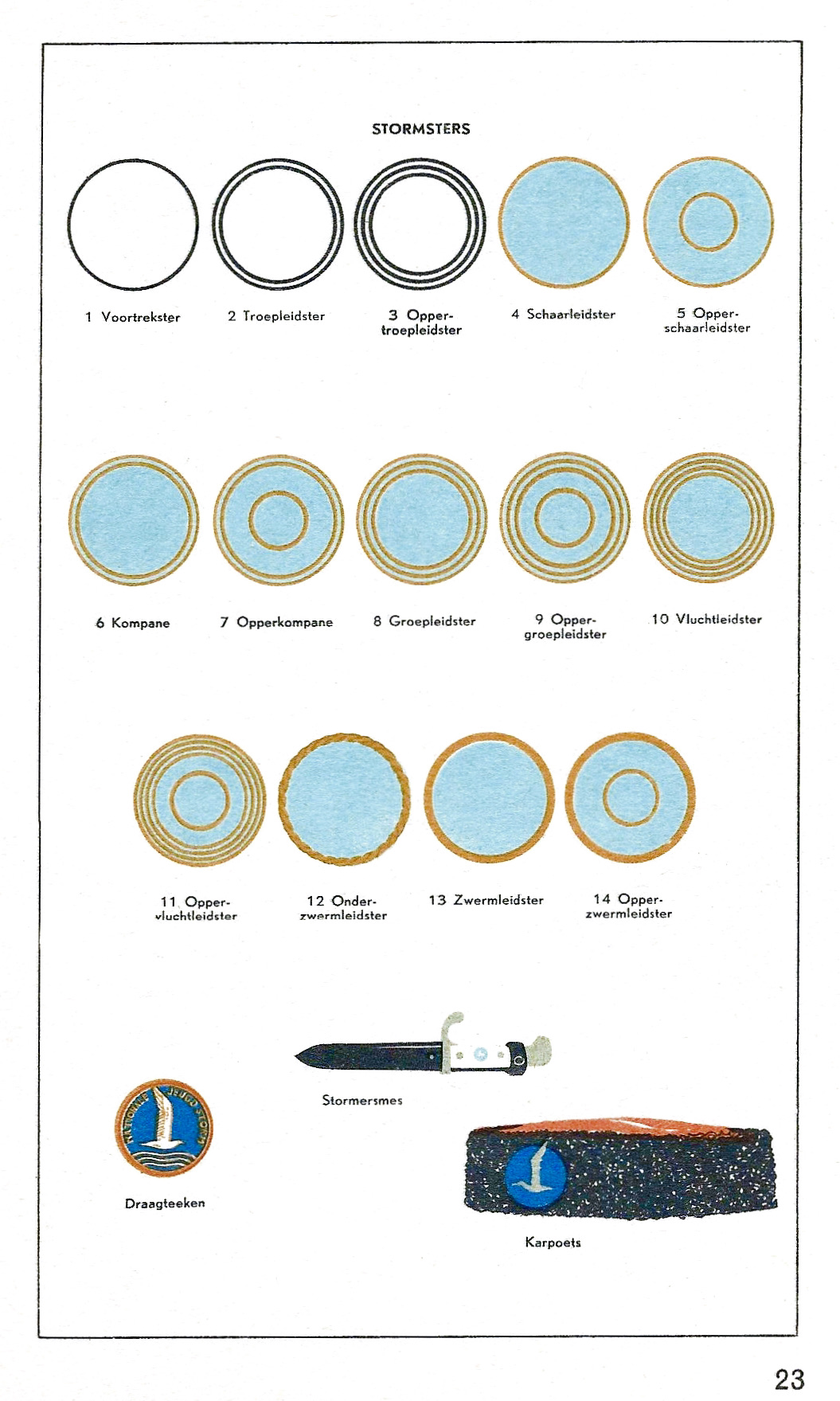

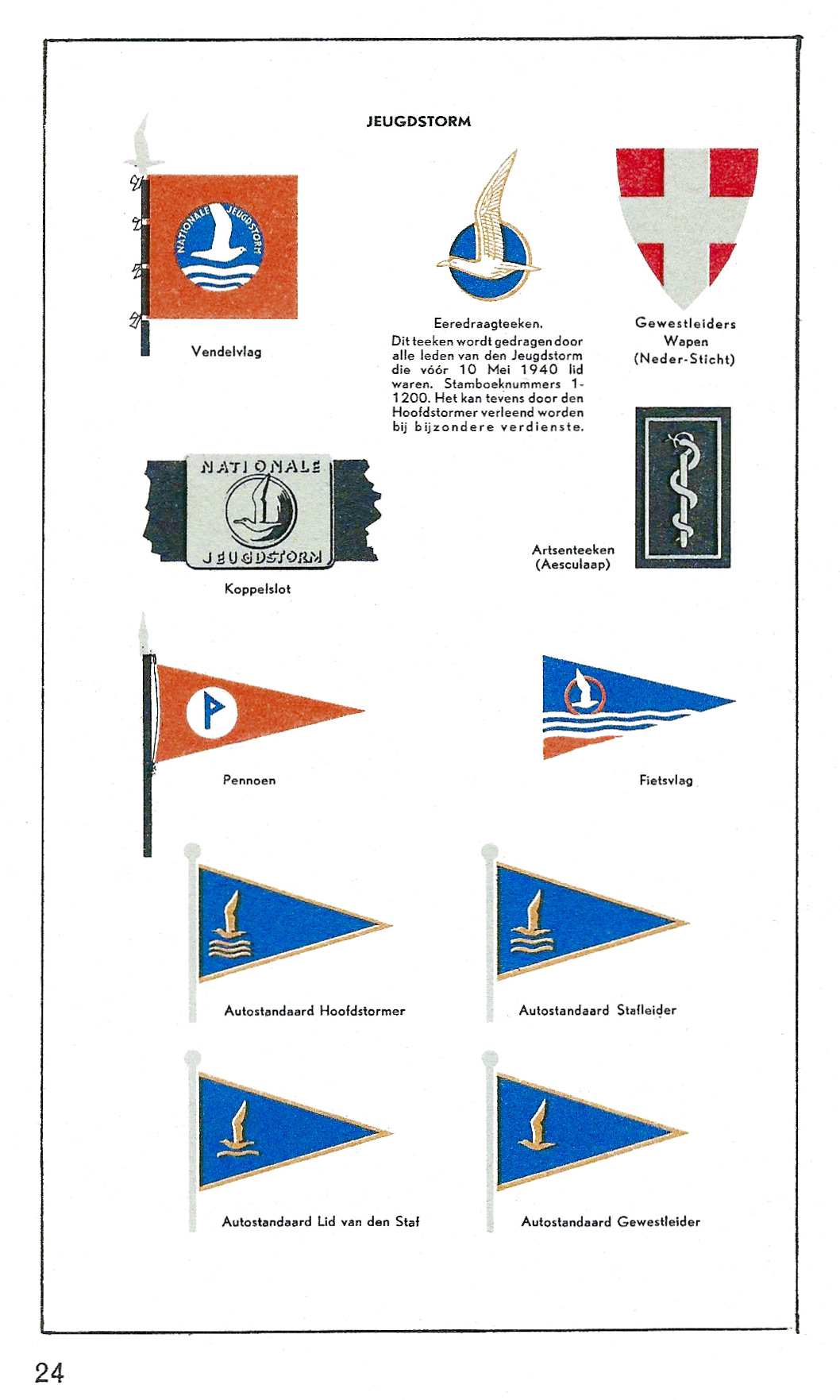
