= Campus The Hague =

Research institution at Leiden University

- Campus Den Haag
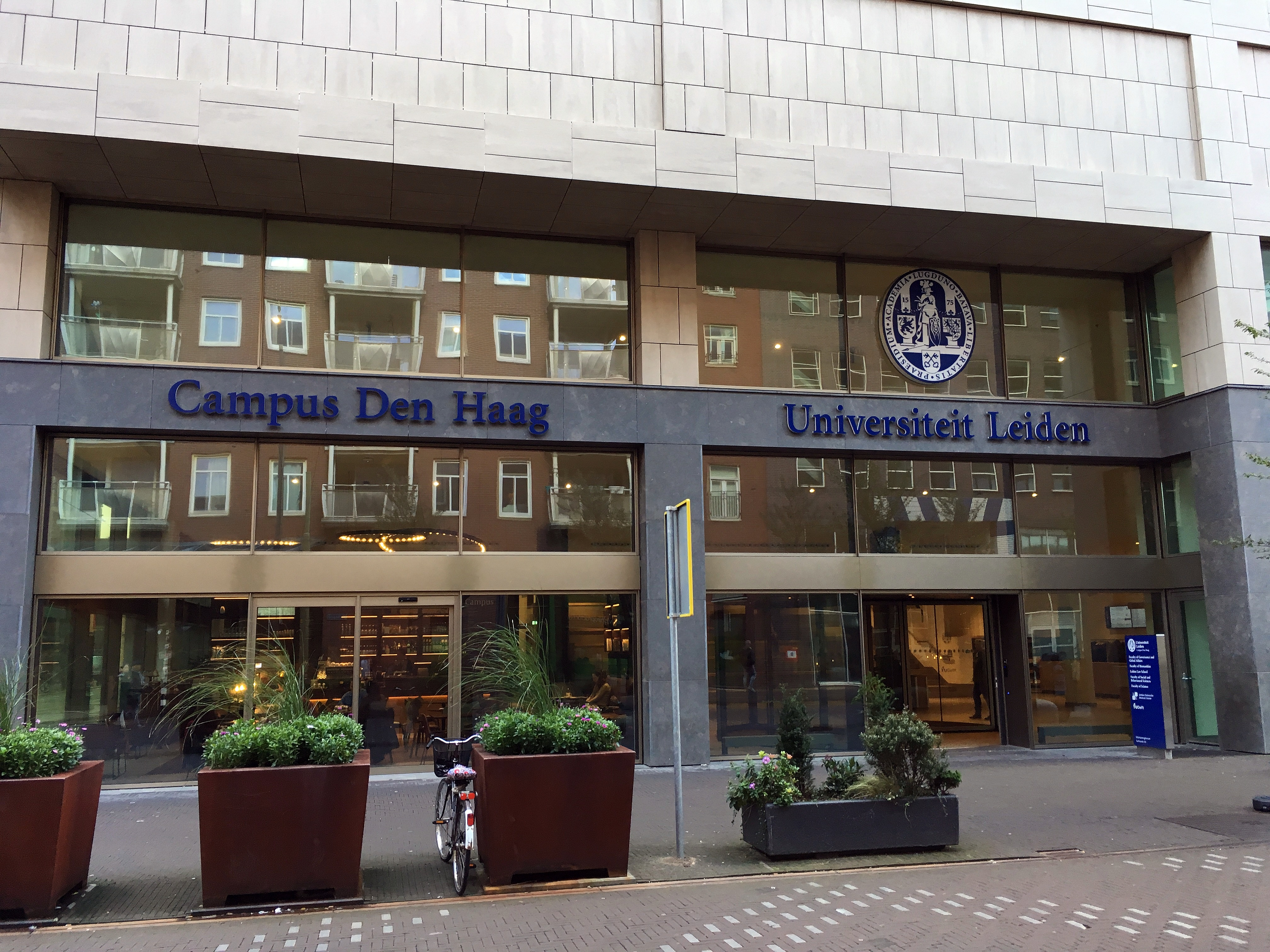
- Campus building (Turfmarkt, The Hague)
- Established: 1575 (Campus The Hague was established in 1998)
- Rector: Hester Bijl
- Students: 7.000 (2022)
- Location: The Hague, South Holland, Netherlands
- Campus: Urban/College town
- Website: www.universiteitleiden.nl/en/the-hague

Campus The Hague is an institution for university education and scientific research, a part of Leiden University, located in The Hague. The teaching and research at Campus The Hague focuses on politics, public administration and international law, urban issues, and health.

== History ==
Campus The Hague was founded in 1998 as a partnership between the university and the municipality of The Hague.

== Education ==
All seven faculties of the university are active in The Hague, and around 20 per cent of the total student body of the university attend this campus. The faculty Governance and Global Affairs (FGGA) is exclusively located in The Hague.

Campus The Hague offers courses on several areas, including public administration, international law, politics and government.

In 2015 Delft University of Technology opened a branch at Campus The Hague, in the Wijnhaven Building, offering a master's degree in Engineering and Policy Analysis.

In 2016, Leiden University Medical Center founded an additional branch at Campus The Hague, with research, teaching and a training program for GPs.

As part of its facilities, Leiden University Library opened a library at Campus The Hague.

== Research ==
The research branch of Campus The Hague focuses on management, international law and government. It includes many research institutes.

=== Institute of Security and Global Affairs ===
The Institute of Security and Global Affairs (ISGA) was created in 2016, when the Centre for Terrorism and Counterterrorism (CTC) and the Centre for Global Affairs were combined. It is one of three research institutes within the Faculty of Governance and Global Affairs (FGGA), and focuses on security. Within this issue, its main themes are terrorism and political violence, cybersecurity, governance of crises, and diplomacy and global affairs.

IGSA focuses on multidisciplinary research and education within the field of security studies, and describes its approach as glocal, meaning that "the local, national, transnational and global impact are studied and analysed in conjunction with each other".

=== Other research institutes ===
- Centre for Innovation
- Centre for Modern Urban Studies (MUS)
- Centre for Professional Learning (CPL)
- Dual PhD Centre
- Grotius Centre for International Legal Studies
- Institute of Public Administration
- Leiden Leadership Centre
- Leiden Risk & Regulation Lab
- Leiden University College The Hague
- Montesquieu Institute, which includes the Parliamentary Documentation Centre (PDC UL)

== Buildings of Campus The Hague ==
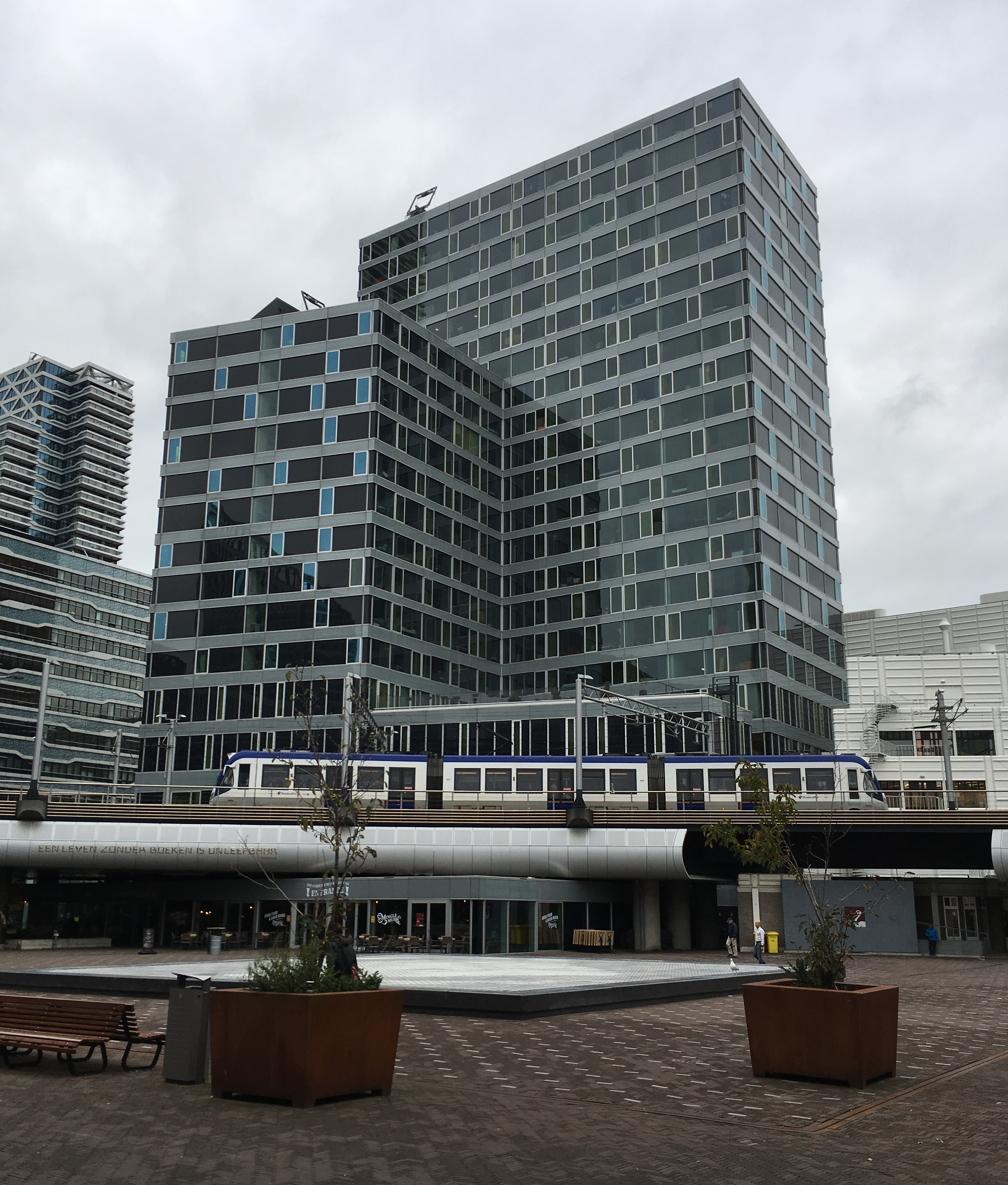
The building housing the University College, near Centraal Station

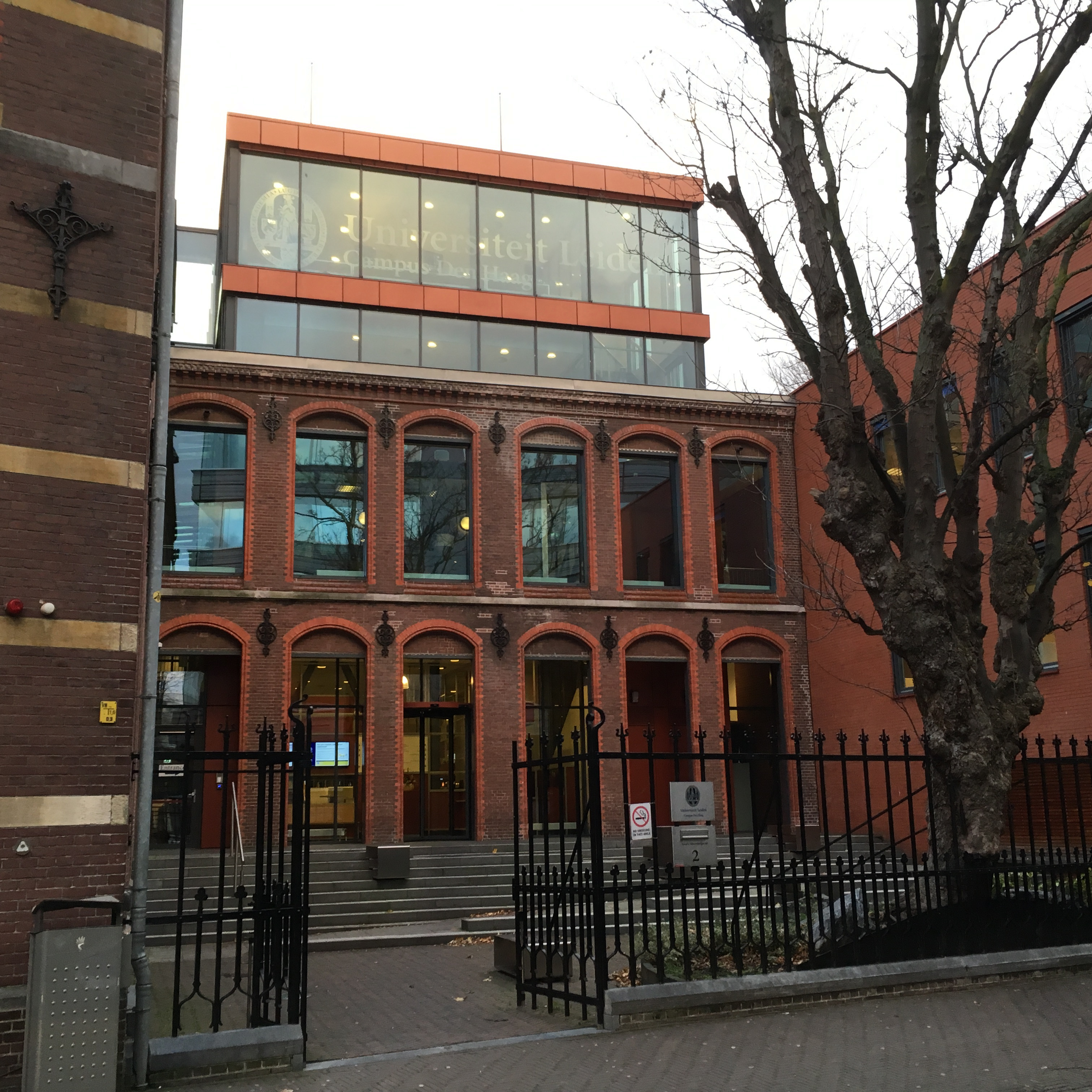
Campus building at Schouwburgstraat

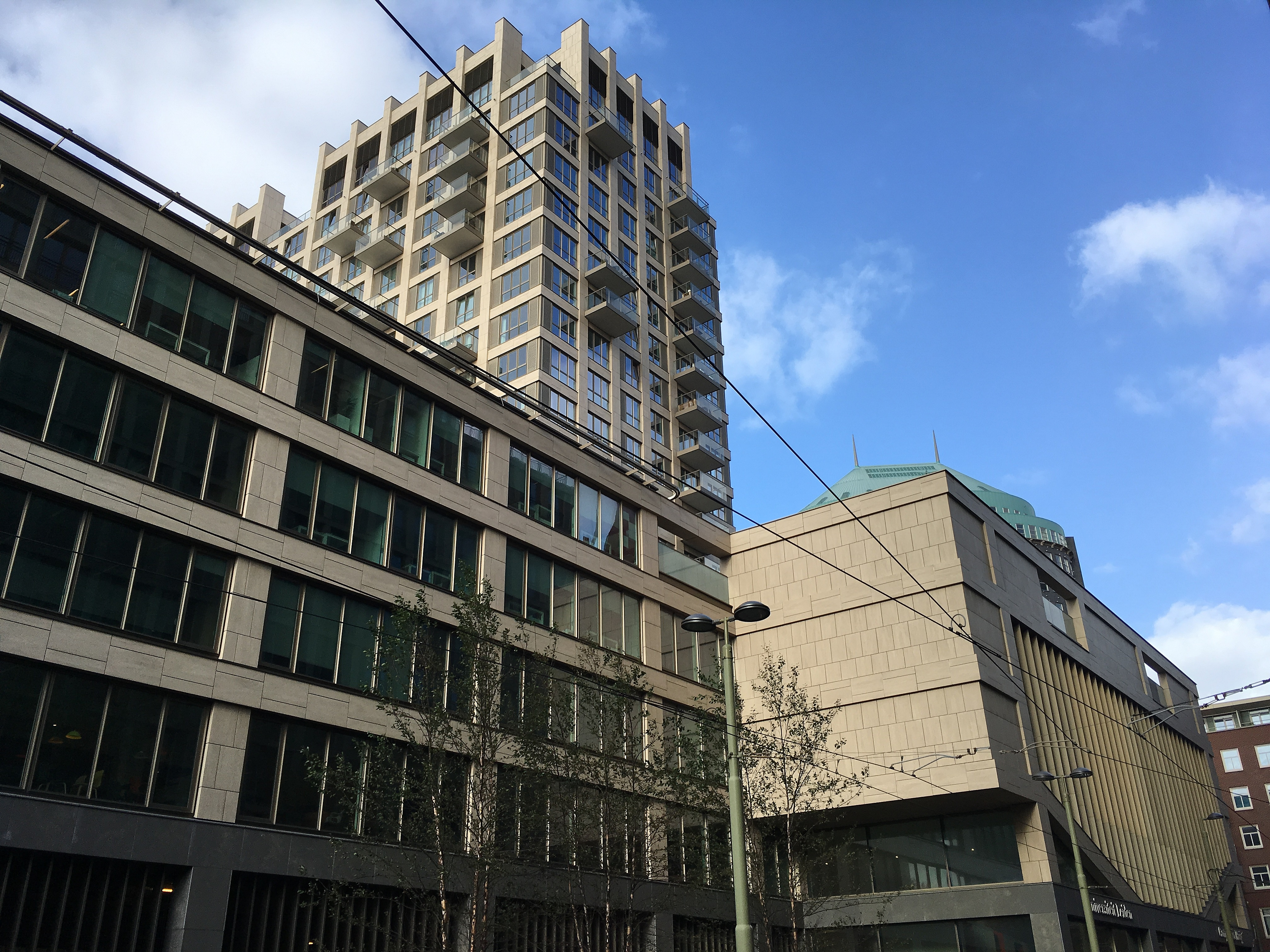
Wijnhaven, the Campus building at Turfmarkt

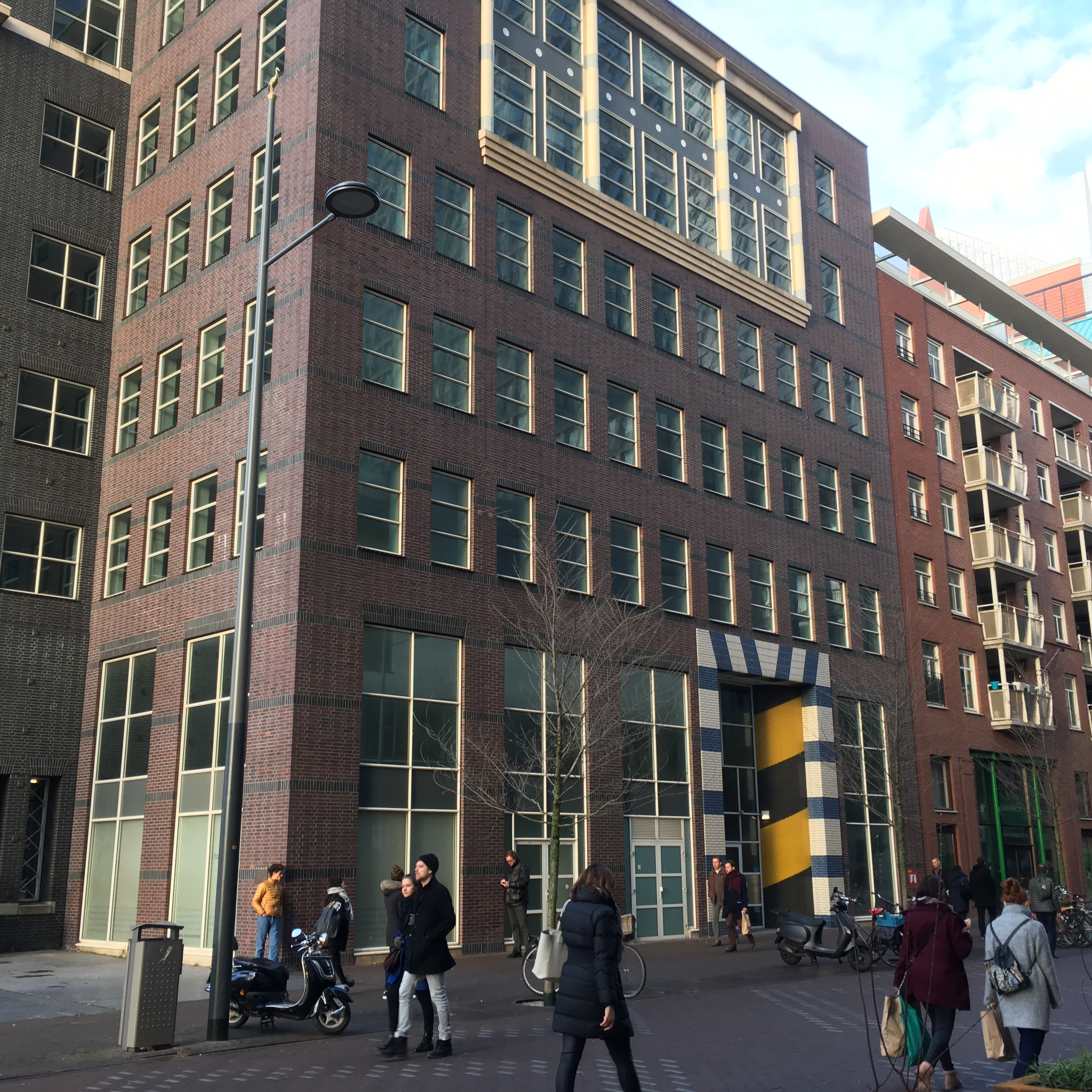
Beehive Student Centre, opened in 2018

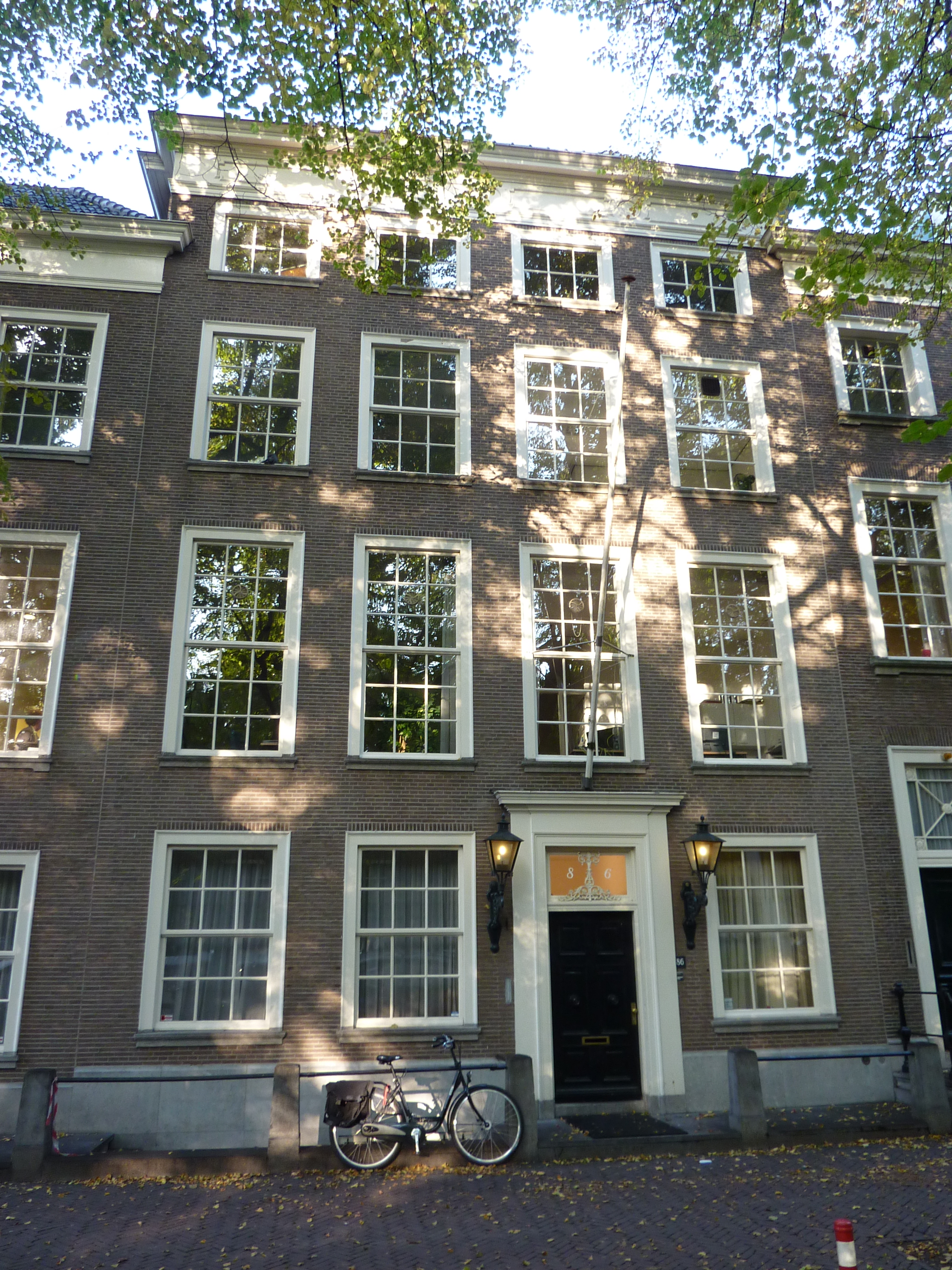
The Parliamentary Documentation Centre (PDC UL) is on the Lange Voorhout.
