= Network of War Collections =

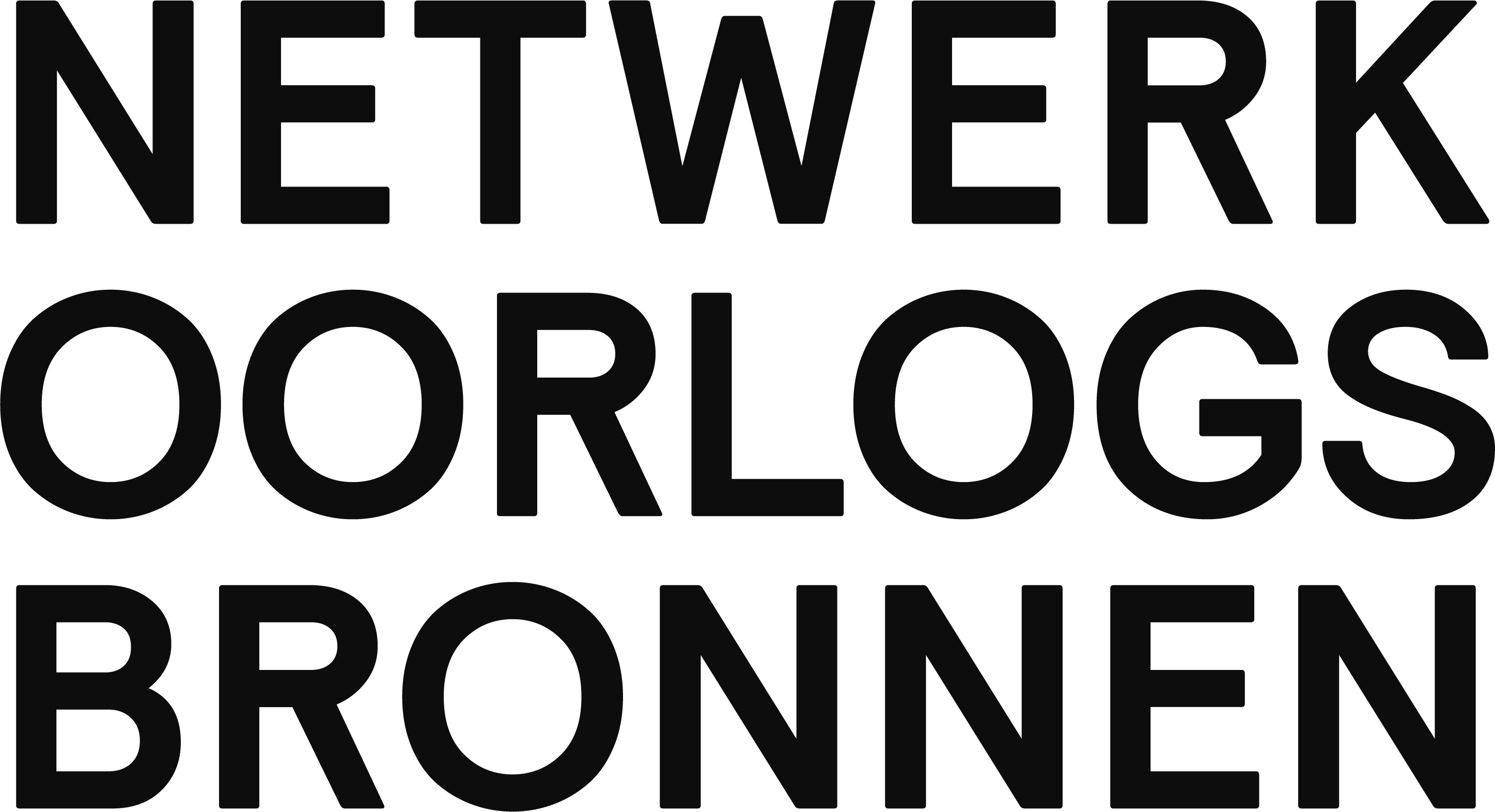

The Network of War Collections (Dutch: Netwerk Oorlogsbronnen, NOB) is a partnership of over 250 archival institutions, museums, remembrance centers and libraries in the Kingdom of the Netherlands, the former Dutch colonial empire, and internationally to bring together scattered collections of resources pertaining to World War II. The network is financed by the Ministry of Health, Welfare and Sport and receives a contribution from the National Fund for Peace, Freedom and Veteran Care.

The c. 12 million sources of information accumulated by the NOB include artifacts, original photographs, diaries, newspaper articles, films, letters, brochures, and posters, which are sorted into themes of resistance, captivity, collaboration, life under German and Japanese occupations, liberation, warfare, international events, The Holocaust and persecution, the lead-up to and aftermath of WWII, and the Indonesian War of Independence.

== Oorlogsbronnen.nl ==
Facilitated by the NIOD Institute for War, Holocaust and Genocide Studies, the digital archive Oorlogsbronnen (English: War Collections) of the Network of War Collections was launched on 10 November 2011. The website uses search technology developed by the Utrecht-based Spinque and is designed by DOOR (IN10) from Rotterdam.

== Notable partners ==
A selection of organizations who have partnered with the Network of War Collections are:

- Airborne Museum 'Hartenstein'
- Amsterdam City Archives
- Amsterdam Museum
- Anne Frank Foundation
- Arolsen Archives - International Center on Nazi Persecution
- Atria Institute on gender equality and women's history
- Camp Vught National Memorial
- Camp Westerbork Memorial Center
- CBG Centrum voor familiegeschiedenis
- Freedom Museum
- Historisch Centrum Leeuwarden
- IHLIA LGBT Heritage
- International Institute of Social History
- Joods Historisch Museum
- Leo Smit Foundation
- Maritime Museum Rotterdam
- Museum Maluku
- Museon
- Nationaal Archief
- National Committee for 4 and 5 May
- National Monument Kamp Amersfoort
- National Monument Oranjehotel
- Natura Artis Magistra
- Netherlands Institute for Sound and Vision
- Netherlands Music Institute
- Railway Museum
- Rijksdienst voor het Cultureel Erfgoed
- Rijksmuseum
- Royal Library of the Netherlands
- Spaarnestad Photo
- Tresoar
- Utrecht Archives
- Verzetsmuseum
