= Cornelis van Geelkerken =

Dutch fascist political leader and Nazi collaborator

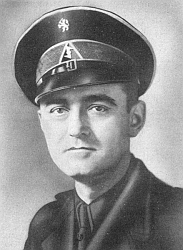
- Cornelis van Geelkerken in uniform

Inspector General of the Nederlandse Landwacht
- In office 12 November 1943 – 1945
- Preceded by: Office created
- Succeeded by: Office abolished

Leader of the Nationale Jeugdstorm
- In office 1 May 1934 – 1945
- Preceded by: Office created
- Succeeded by: Office abolished

Personal details
- Born: Cornelis van Geelkerken; 19 March 1901 Molenbeek-Saint-Jean, Belgium
- Died: 29 March 1976 (aged 75) Ede, Netherlands
- Party: National Socialist Movement (1931–1945)
- Other political affiliations: Nederlandsche Oranje-Nationalisten; Verbond van Actualisten
- Spouse: Johanna Dorothea Eschauzier (m. 1927)

Cornelis "Kees" van Geelkerken (Dutch pronunciation: [kɔrˈneːlɪs fɑŋ ˈɣeːlkɛrkə(n)]; (Note: Van in isolation: [vɑn].) 19 March 1901 – 29 March 1976) was a Dutch fascist political leader and Nazi collaborator.

Van Geelkerken was born in 1901 to a Dutch family in Molenbeek-Saint-Jean, Belgium, and grew up in Utrecht. He gravitated toward fascism in the 1920s while working as a municipal employee in Zeist and Utrecht. Van Geelkerken co-founded the far-right National Socialist Movement in the Netherlands (NSB) with Anton Mussert in 1931. He was made the leader of the Nationale Jeugdstorm, the party's youth corps.

In 1943, during the German occupation of the Netherlands, Van Geelkerken was appointed Inspector-General of the Nederlandse Landwacht, a collaborationist paramilitary created by the Germans to combat the Dutch resistance. He was expelled from the NSB in early 1945 after a falling out with Mussert. After the war, he was tried in the Bijzonder Gerechtshof ("Special Court of Justice") and sentenced to life imprisonment. Geelkerken was released from prison in 1959 and died in 1976 in Ede.

== See also ==
- Netherlands in World War II
- Quisling

== Works ==
- Voor Volk en Vaderland, Utrecht, 1943
