= STIWOT =

Organization

- Stichting Informatie Wereldoorlog Twee
- Predecessor: Go2War2.nl
- Formation: 2002
- Founder: Frank van der Drift
- Legal status: Foundation
- Headquarters: Badhoevedorp
- Location: The Netherlands
- Fields: War history
- Official language: Dutch, English
- Volunteers: 80 (part-time)
- Website: https://www.stiwot.nl

STIWOT ("Stichting Informatie Wereldoorlog Twee"; English: Foundation for Information on World War Two) is a Dutch non-profit organization founded in 2002 to disseminate information about the Second World War, based on the website Go2War2.nl, established in 1999 by Frank van der Drift. It does this mainly through the Internet. The foundation maintains several multi-lingual online projects that deal with the history of the Second World War. Both professional historians and hobbyists are encouraged to provide additional information or images.

== Work ==
STIWOT translated the Nuremberg trials documents to Dutch. It also published the list of names of the victims of the Operation Silbertanne.

== Projects ==
- TracesofWar
