= Verzetsmuseum =

Museum in Plantage, Amsterdam, the Netherlands

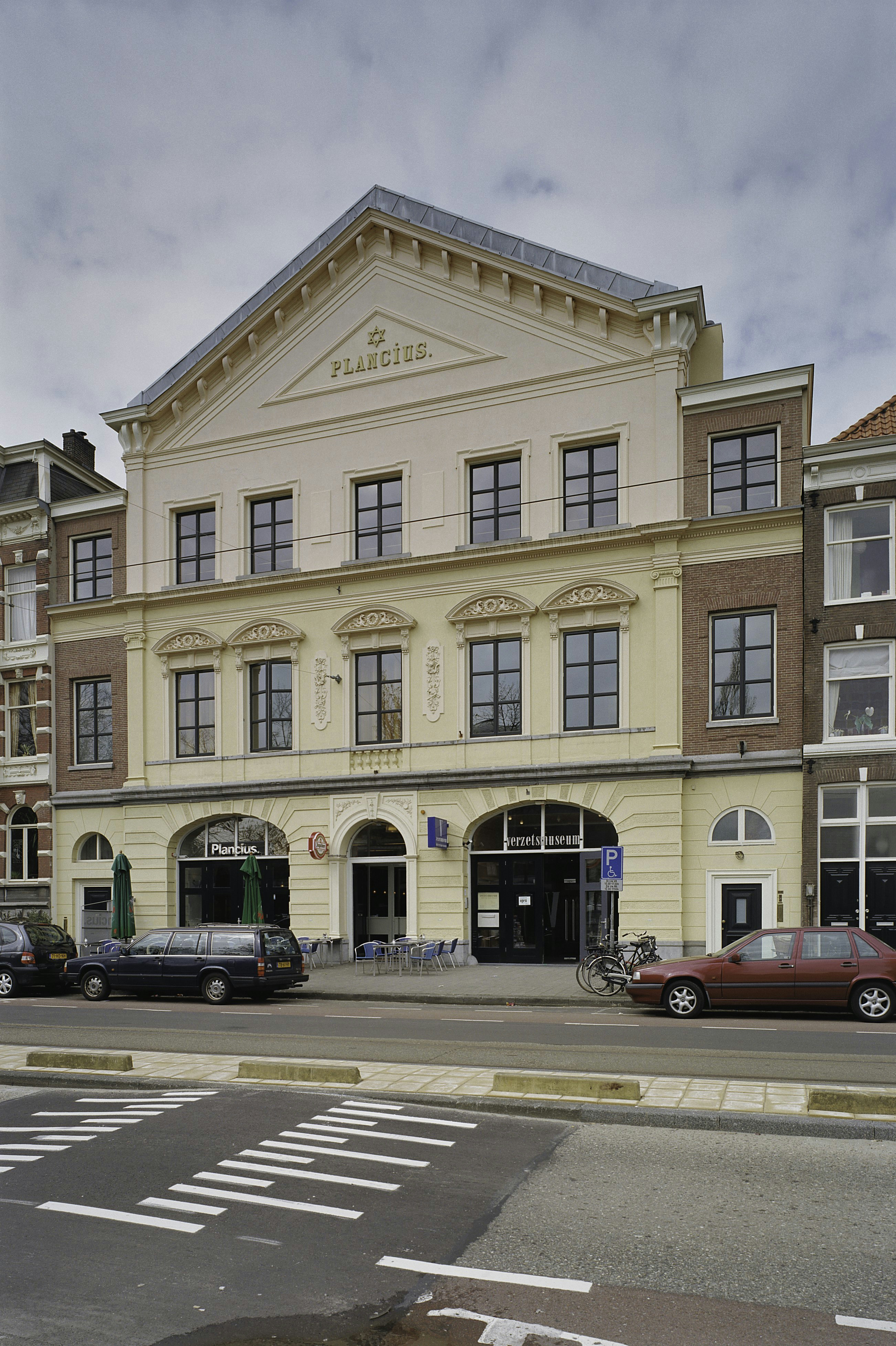
- Verzetsmuseum in 2005

- Location in Amsterdam
- Established: 1999
- Location: Plantage Kerklaan 61; Amsterdam, Netherlands
- Coordinates: 52.3679°N 4.9128°E
- Website: www.verzetsmuseum.org

The Resistance Museum (Dutch: Verzetsmuseum) is a museum located in the Plantage neighbourhood in Amsterdam, the Netherlands. The Dutch Resistance Museum, chosen as the best historical museum of the Netherlands, aims to tell the story of the Dutch people in World War II. From 14 May 1940 to 5 May 1945, the Netherlands were occupied by Nazi Germany.

Permanent exhibits of the museum recreate the atmosphere of the streets of Amsterdam during the German occupation of World War II. Big photographs, old posters, objects, films and sounds from that time, help to recreate the scene. The background of the Holocaust is also visualized to the visitor. This is an exhibition about everyday life during that time, setting them within the larger historical events, to show the varieties of resistance of the Dutch population to the Nazi occupation, including their Dutch collaborators.

== The museum building ==
The building bearing the Star of David and the name of Petrus Plancius (1550-1622), the Renaissance Amsterdam clergyman and geographer, was built in 1876 by the Jewish singing society Oefening Baart Kunst (practice makes perfect). It served for several decades as a Jewish cultural center and synagogue. The Oefening Baart Kunst society kept the Plancius name on its building to underline its respect to the Amsterdam city traditions. Plancius was the name of the old house located there prior to construction of the building. For a long time, the Plancius building served many different functions. Since 1999, after its renovation, it is the seat of the Verzetsmuseum.

== Permanent exhibition ==
The focus of Verzetsmuseum is the German Occupation of the Netherlands from multiple individuals' perspectives in the Dutch resistance to Nazi rule, from the May 1940 invasion to liberation in May 1945. The museum has published the catalogue of its permanent exhibition, which opened in 2022, The Netherlands during the Second World War in One Hundred Stories. Digital information on the museum also outlines its focus.

== See also ==
- Dutch National Holocaust Museum
- NIOD Institute for War, Holocaust and Genocide Studies
- Overloon War Museum
