= Parlementair Documentatie Centrum =

The Parlementair Documentatie Centrum (PDC; English: Parliamentary Documentation Centre), is an institute connected to Leiden University that documents the parliamentary history of the Netherlands. It is part of the Montesquieu Institute on Campus The Hague, and situated at Lange Voorhout 86.

Its function is to collect and make available information about the Dutch parliament, and it manages several websites about European matters. The centre was founded in 1974.

== Parlement.com ==
Parlement.com, formerly Parlement & Politiek (English: Parliament & Politics), is a website with information about Dutch politics and that of the European Union. The website is maintained by the PDC and focuses on contemporary Dutch politics and politicians as well as those of the past centuries.

Part of the website functions as a digital biographical dictionary and archive that contains extensive data on Dutch and European politicians and administrators since 1795. In addition to ministers, state secretaries, and members of partliament, this also includes members of the Council of State, members of the Court of Audit, and King's commissioners.

In addition, information can be found about the relationship between the Netherlands and the EU, in particular with regards to its membership of the European Parliament and the European Commission, and the involvement of parliament in EU regulation.

The website attracts 60,000 visitors every week.
