= Dolle Dinsdag =

Event in the Netherlands on 5 September 1944

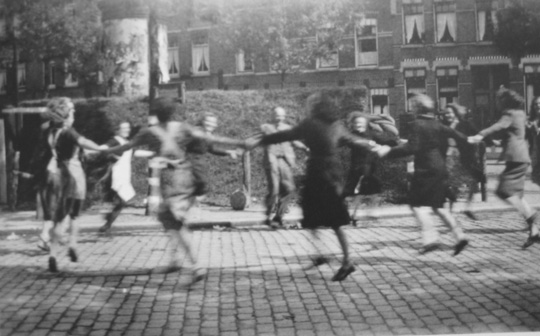
Dolle Dinsdag celebration (5 September 1944) at Willebrordusplein, Rotterdam

Dolle Dinsdag (English: Mad Tuesday) took place in the Netherlands (at the time occupied by Nazi Germany) on 5 September 1944, when celebrations were prompted after broadcasts incorrectly reported that Breda had been liberated by Allied forces.

== Events ==
On 4 September 1944, the Allies conquered Antwerp, and it was thought that they had already advanced into the Netherlands. Radio Oranje broadcasts, one by the Prime Minister-in-exile Pieter Sjoerds Gerbrandy, increased the confusion; twice, in just over twelve hours (at 23:45 on 4 September and again the morning of 5 September), they announced that Breda, 8 kilometers from the border with Belgium, had been liberated (though in fact this success would not be achieved until 29 October 1944, some eight weeks later, by forces of the 1st Polish Armoured Division of General Maczek). The news spread rapidly, with underground newspapers preparing headlines announcing the "fall of Breda".

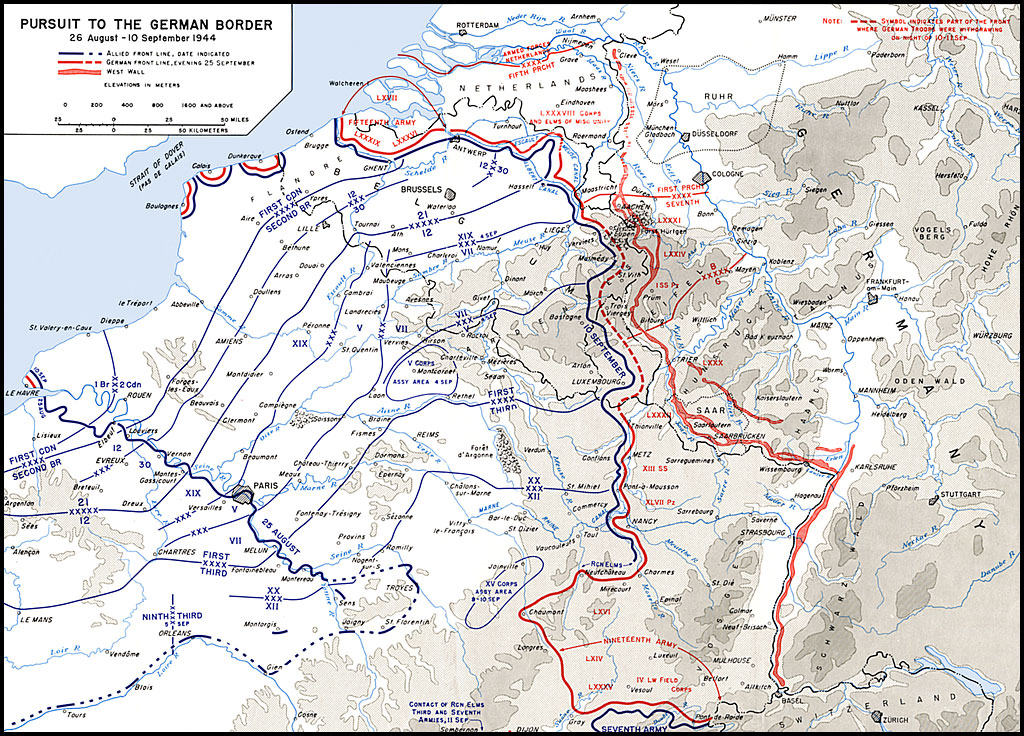
Allied advances in the region, 26 August – 10 September 1944.

Further fueling speculation, German occupation officials Arthur Seyss-Inquart (appointed Reichskommissar for the Occupied Netherlands in May 1940) and Hanns Albin Rauter, SS and police leader announced a "State of Siege" for the Netherlands to the 300,000 cable radio listeners and in the newspapers of the following day:

The population must maintain order ... it is strictly forbidden to flee areas that are threatened by the enemy. All orders from the military commanders must be strictly adhered to and without question ... any resistance to the occupation forces will be suppressed with force of weaponry. Any attempt to fraternize with the enemy or to hinder the German Reich and its allies in any form will be dealt with harshly; perpetrators will be shot.'

Despite the threats, many Dutchmen celebrated on the streets while preparing to receive and cheer on the Allied liberators. Dutch and Orange flags and pennants were prepared, and many left their workplace to wait for the Allies to arrive. The extent of this optimism has been hard for historians to gauge in the absence of contemporary surveys, but it can be discerned as significant through researchers accessing diaries and finding an increase in births nine months after Dolle Dinsdag. German occupation forces and NSB members panicked: documents were destroyed and many fled for Germany. Ary Willem Gijsbert Koppejan (1919–2013), a member of the resistance organisation De Ondergedoken Camera (the Underground Camera), secretly photographed German troops fleeing Den Haag and soldiers and collaborators waiting at the railway station.

== Effects ==
The Allied advance could not continue as the Allies had overextended themselves and halted in the South of the Netherlands and, as Operation Market Garden in September was an outright failure, the planned Allied advance across the Rhine had to be abandoned. The occupiers' nervousness turned to aggression after the landings in Normandy in June 1944 and increased after Dolle Dinsdag. Due to the defeat of Operation Market Garden, the liberation of the remaining Dutch territory was postponed until the following spring, and the northern part of the Netherlands had to wait until 5 May 1945 for their liberation. This last winter under occupation became known as the “Hunger Winter", killing approximately 25,000 victims, mostly elderly men, though the toll from its related health effects is likely to have been higher.

Mad Tuesday caused the railway strikes of 1944 that started on 17 September with the code: "De kinderen van Versteeg moeten onder de wol" (translation: the children of Versteeg must "get under the wool"/go to bed). The strike would last until the Netherlands was liberated fully on 5 May 1945; the government-in-exile thought that by spreading rumors the Germans would start to panic. This worked: by announcing the railway strike of 1944 the Germans started to panic even more, and many Germans and Dutch collaborators fled to Germany, fearing reprisals. (Seyss-Inquart had already set an example; on 3 September, he had sent his wife to Salzburg.) The industry and supply rail route from and to Germany was almost completely inoperative, which made it even harder for Germany to defend what was still occupied.

== Origin of the term ==
The originator of the phrase "Dolle Dinsdag" is presumed to be Willem van den Hout, alias Willem W. Waterman, who first used it in a headline in the September 15 issue of his magazine De Gil ('The Yell', with 200,000 subscribers), though it had likely emerged in general usage before that. De Gil satirised the NSB, the German occupiers, and the Dutch government-in-exile, but was actually funded by the Hauptabteilung für Volksaufklärung und Propaganda, the German propaganda department.
