= 1937 Dutch Senate election =

Netherlands Senate election

- 27 May 1937
- All 50 seats in the Senate; 26 seats needed for a majority
Party	Leader	Vote %	Seats	+/–
RKSP		29.89	16	0
SDAP		25.38	12	+1
ARP		12.02	7	+1
CHU		11.00	6	−1
NSB		7.87	4	+2
LSP		5.97	3	−2
VDB		3.84	2	−1
This lists parties that won seats. See the complete results below.
President of the Senate before	President of the Senate after
Willem Lodewijk de Vos van Steenwijk; CHU	Willem Lodewijk de Vos van Steenwijk; CHU

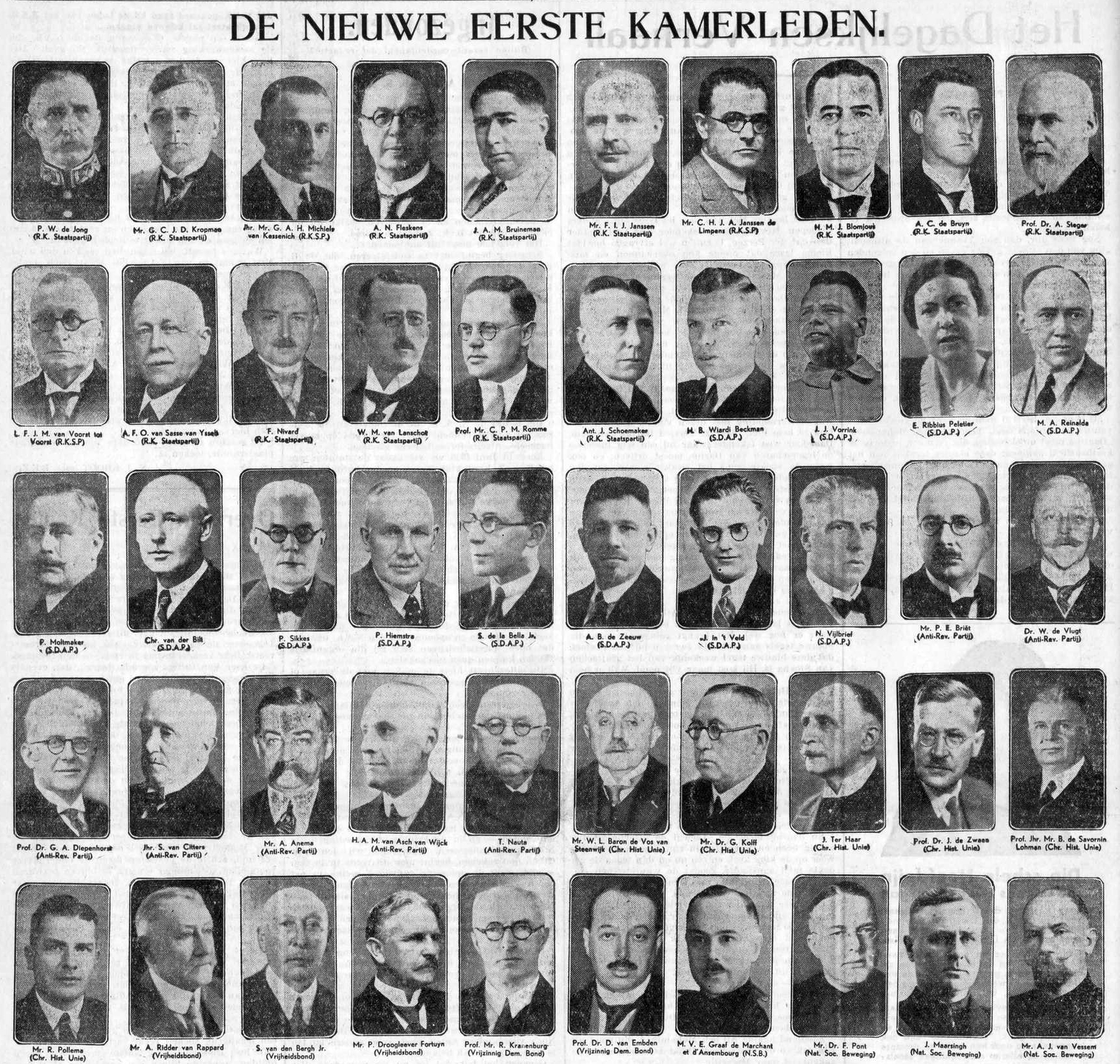
Elected Senators

Elections for all 50 seats in the Senate of the Netherlands were held on 27 May 1937. The snap elections, held a day after a snap general election, were triggered by the passing of a proposed constitutional amendment.

Senators were elected by provincial councils in four "electoral groups". Group I comprised North Brabant, Zeeland, Utrecht and Limburg; group II comprised Gelderland, Overijssel, Groningen and Drenthe; group III comprised North Holland and Friesland; and group IV comprised South Holland. Within each electoral group, Senators were elected by provincial councils using party-list proportional representation. Provincial councillors' votes were weighted to their province's population.

The 25 incumbent Senators for groups II and IV were previously elected five years prior in the 1932 Senate election, while the 25 incumbent Senators for groups I and III were elected two years prior in the 1935 Senate election. This was the last Senate election before the outbreak of World War II.

The election saw the incumbent government's majority shrink from 37 to 34 seats, with the Liberal State Party losing two seats, and the Free-thinking Democratic League losing one. In group III, one seats changed hands from the Anti-Revolutionary Party to the Christian Historical Union, both government parties. The National Socialist Movement gained two seats, while the Social Democratic Workers' Party gained one.

== Results ==
1937 Senate election
Party	Unweighted		Weighted		Seats	+/–
Party	Votes	%	Votes	%	Seats	+/–
Roman Catholic State Party	168	28.97	23,294	29.89	16	0
Social Democratic Workers' Party	138	23.79	19,777	25.38	12	+1
Anti-Revolutionary Party	78	13.45	9,366	12.02	7	+1
Christian Historical Union	68	11.72	8,572	11.00	6	−1
National Socialist Movement	44	7.59	6,136	7.87	4	+2
Liberal State Party	31	5.34	4,653	5.97	3	−2
Free-thinking Democratic League	28	4.83	2,993	3.84	2	−1
Reformed Political Party	13	2.24	1,769	2.27	0	0
Christian Democratic Union	9	1.55	787	1.01	0	0
Catholic Democratic Party	3	0.52	575	0.74	0	0
Total	580	100.00	77,922	100.00	50	0
Valid votes	580	100.00	77,922	100.00		
Invalid/blank votes	0	0.00	0	0.00		
Total votes	580	100.00	77,922	100.00		
Registered voters/turnout	590	98.31	79,357	98.19		
Source: Staatscourant

=== By electoral group ===
1937 Senate election in electoral group I
Party	Unweighted		Weighted		Seats	+/–
Party	Votes	%	Votes	%	Seats	+/–
Roman Catholic State Party	107	56.02	13,215	63.39	9	0
Social Democratic Workers' Party	23	12.04	2,311	11.09	1	0
Anti-Revolutionary Party	17	8.90	1,445	6.93	1	0
Christian Historical Union	18	9.42	1,464	7.02	1	0
National Socialist Movement	13	6.81	1,404	6.73	1	0
Reformed Political Party	6	3.14	434	2.08	0	0
Liberal State Party	3	1.57	217	1.04	0	0
Free-thinking Democratic League	3	1.57	217	1.04	0	0
Catholic Democratic Party	1	0.52	140	0.67	0	New
Total	191	100.00	20,847	100.00	13	0
Valid votes	191	100.00	20,847	100.00		
Invalid/blank votes	0	0.00	0	0.00		
Total votes	191	100.00	20,847	100.00		
Registered voters/turnout	192	99.48	20,987	99.33		
Source: Staatscourant

1937 Senate election in electoral group II
Party	Unweighted		Weighted		Seats	+/–
Party	Votes	%	Votes	%	Seats	+/–
Social Democratic Workers' Party	47	25.68	4,687	24.65	3	0
Roman Catholic State Party	33	18.03	4,075	21.43	3	0
Anti-Revolutionary Party	28	15.30	2,677	14.08	2	0
Christian Historical Union	24	13.11	2,540	13.36	2	0
National Socialist Movement	16	8.74	1,607	8.45	1	New
Liberal State Party	12	6.56	1,188	6.25	1	−1
Free-thinking Democratic League	14	7.65	1,316	6.92	1	0
Christian Democratic Union	6	3.28	547	2.88	0	New
Reformed Political Party	3	1.64	379	1.99	0	0
Total	183	100.00	19,016	100.00	13	0
Valid votes	183	100.00	19,016	100.00		
Invalid/blank votes	0	0.00	0	0.00		
Total votes	183	100.00	19,016	100.00		
Registered voters/turnout	189	96.83	19,680	96.63		
Source: Staatscourant

1937 Senate election in electoral group III
Party	Unweighted		Weighted		Seats	+/–
Party	Votes	%	Votes	%	Seats	+/–
Social Democratic Workers' Party	43	34.40	6,804	36.39	4	0
Roman Catholic State Party	16	12.80	3,136	16.77	2	0
Anti-Revolutionary Party	21	16.80	2,376	12.71	2	+1
Christian Historical Union	14	11.20	1,700	9.09	1	−1
Free-thinking Democratic League	11	8.80	1,460	7.81	1	0
National Socialist Movement	8	6.40	1,452	7.76	1	0
Liberal State Party	8	6.40	1,336	7.14	1	0
Christian Democratic Union	3	2.40	240	1.28	0	0
Catholic Democratic Party	1	0.80	196	1.05	0	0
Total	125	100.00	18,700	100.00	12	0
Valid votes	125	100.00	18,700	100.00		
Invalid/blank votes	0	0.00	0	0.00		
Total votes	125	100.00	18,700	100.00		
Registered voters/turnout	127	98.43	19,092	97.95		
Source: Staatscourant

1937 Senate election in electoral group IV
Party	Unweighted		Weighted		Seats	+/–
Party	Votes	%	Votes	%	Seats	+/–
Social Democratic Workers' Party	25	30.86	5,975	30.86	4	+1
Anti-Revolutionary Party	12	14.81	2,868	14.81	2	0
Christian Historical Union	12	14.81	2,868	14.81	2	0
Roman Catholic State Party	12	14.81	2,868	14.81	2	0
Liberal State Party	8	9.88	1,912	9.88	1	−1
National Socialist Movement	7	8.64	1,673	8.64	1	New
Reformed Political Party	4	4.94	956	4.94	0	0
Catholic Democratic Party	1	1.23	239	1.23	0	New
Total	81	100.00	19,359	100.00	12	0
Valid votes	81	100.00	19,359	100.00		
Invalid/blank votes	0	0.00	0	0.00		
Total votes	81	100.00	19,359	100.00		
Registered voters/turnout	82	98.78	19,598	98.78		
Source: Staatscourant
