= List of candidates in the 1937 Dutch general election =

Prior to the 1937 Dutch general election, contesting parties put forward party lists.

== 15: National Socialist Movement ==
=== Groningen, Friesland, Drenthe, Overijssel, Gelderland, Utrecht, North Holland, South Holland ===
Candidates in Groningen, Friesland, Drenthe, Overijssel, Gelderland, Utrecht, North Holland, South Holland for the National Socialist Movement
Position	Candidate	Votes	Result
1	Anton Mussert	144,043	Elected, but declined
2	Cornelis van Geelkerken	559	Elected, but declined
3	Gerhardus Dieters	2,485	Elected
4	Jan Woudenberg	88	Replacement
5	Willem Otto Adriaan Koster	75	
6	Meinoud Rost van Tonningen	159	Replacement
7	K.J. Geldorp	64	
8	Gerardus Frederik Vlekke	79	
9	J.H.L. de Bruin	34	
10	A.J. van Peperstraate	62	
11	J.Ph. van Kampen	65	
12	Willem Ongers	48	
13	Egon von Bönninghausen	44	
14	A.J. Spelt	46	
15	Wilhelmus de Rijke	35	
16	A. Froma	17	
17	James van Hoey Smith	52	
18	G. de Jong	25	
19	F.O. Bruyning	25	
20	A.J. Aeilkema	73	

=== Limburg, North Brabant, Zeeland ===
Candidates in Limburg, North Brabant, Zeeland for the National Socialist Movement
Position	Candidate	Votes	Result
1	Anton Mussert	21,985	
2	Max de Marchant et d'Ansembourg	532	Elected
3	R.H. Kamphuis	226	
4	J.A. Dekker	33	
5	H. de Bock	15	
6	Willem Herweijer	15	
7	W. van der Goes van Naters	3	
8	A.F.C. Donders	22	
9	H. Hendriks	2	
10	J.H. Meijer	17	
11	M.F.L.H. Welters	53	
12	H.W. Paes	4	
13	A.J. Ilcken	4	
14	K.H.H.H.P.L. Mentjens	17	
15	A. de Waard	20	
16	J.W. Frowein	2	
17	W.R. Jager	0	
18	J.D. de Ruyter	6	
19	J.C. Koert	24	
20	L.P.J.A. Munnichs	39	
