= Volk en Vaderland =

Dutch pro-Nazi newspaper

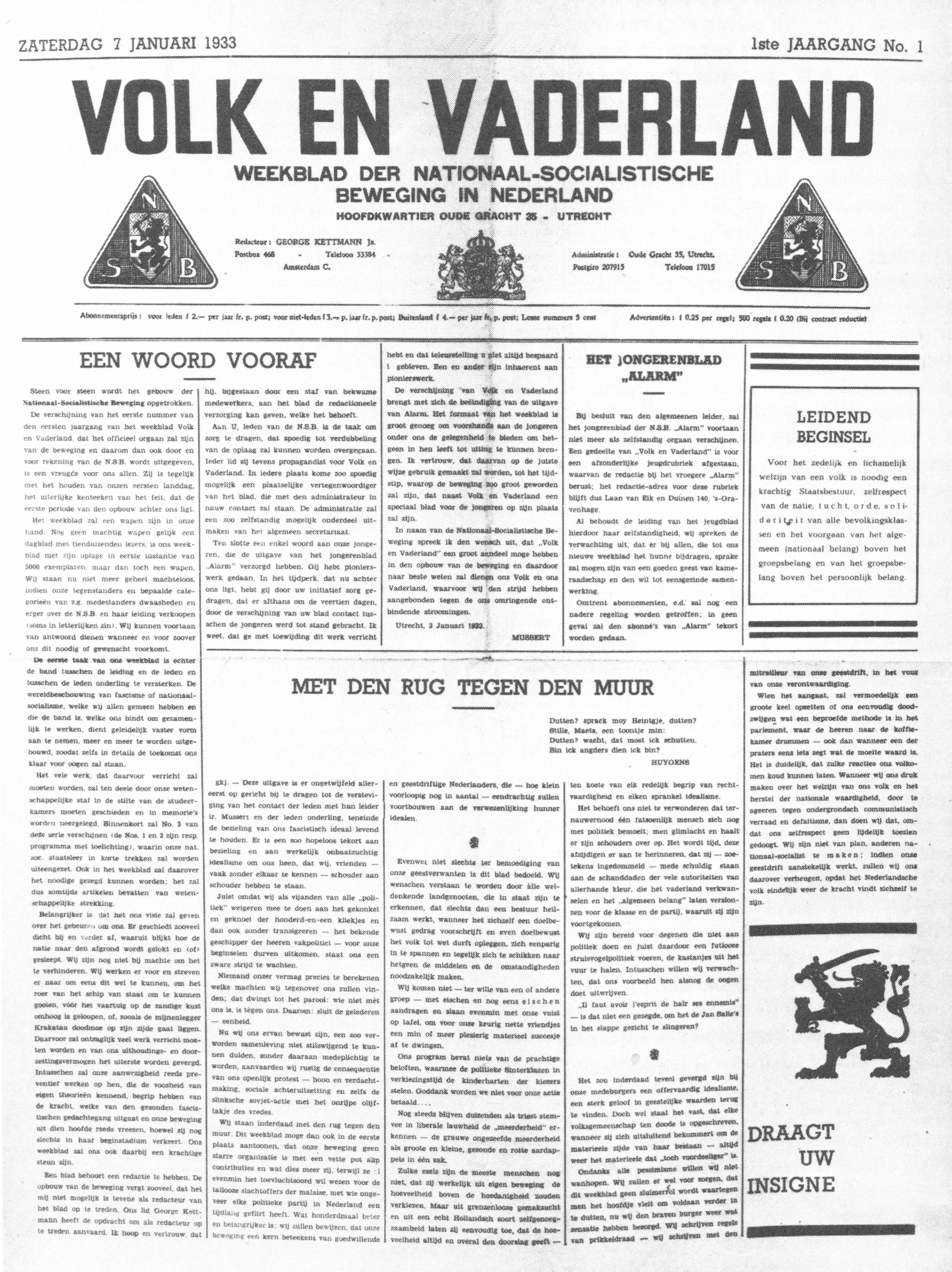
Volk en Vaderland, first issue 7 January 1933.

Volk en Vaderland (People and Fatherland) was a Dutch weekly paper published by Nenasu (Nederlandsch Nationaal Socialistische Uitgeverij), a Nazi publishing firm owned by Anton Mussert. Mussert was leader of the NSB or National Socialist Movement in the Netherlands. The NSB was a Nazi Dutch political party that collaborated with the German occupier during World War II.

The weekly paper, also known as VoVa, was founded in January 1933. It was the oldest national magazine related to the NSB. It was published in newspaper format and was sold mostly by peddling in the streets. It had a print run of 40,000 in May 1940 and grew to 200,000 in 1943, but in the last year of World War II its print run decreased to only 15,000.

The street peddling of the weekly often led to riots and fights with opponents of the NSB. As VoVa reflected the opinions of the NSB's political leadership, it gradually moved from fascism to national socialism. During the German occupation of the Netherlands from May 1940 to May 1945 the paper's content was in line with Nazism.

After the liberation the publication was ended and until 2023 the name Volk en Vaderland is banned for use by new publications.

== See also ==
- Volk en Staat

== "Volk En Vaderland" 31 Mei 1940 ==
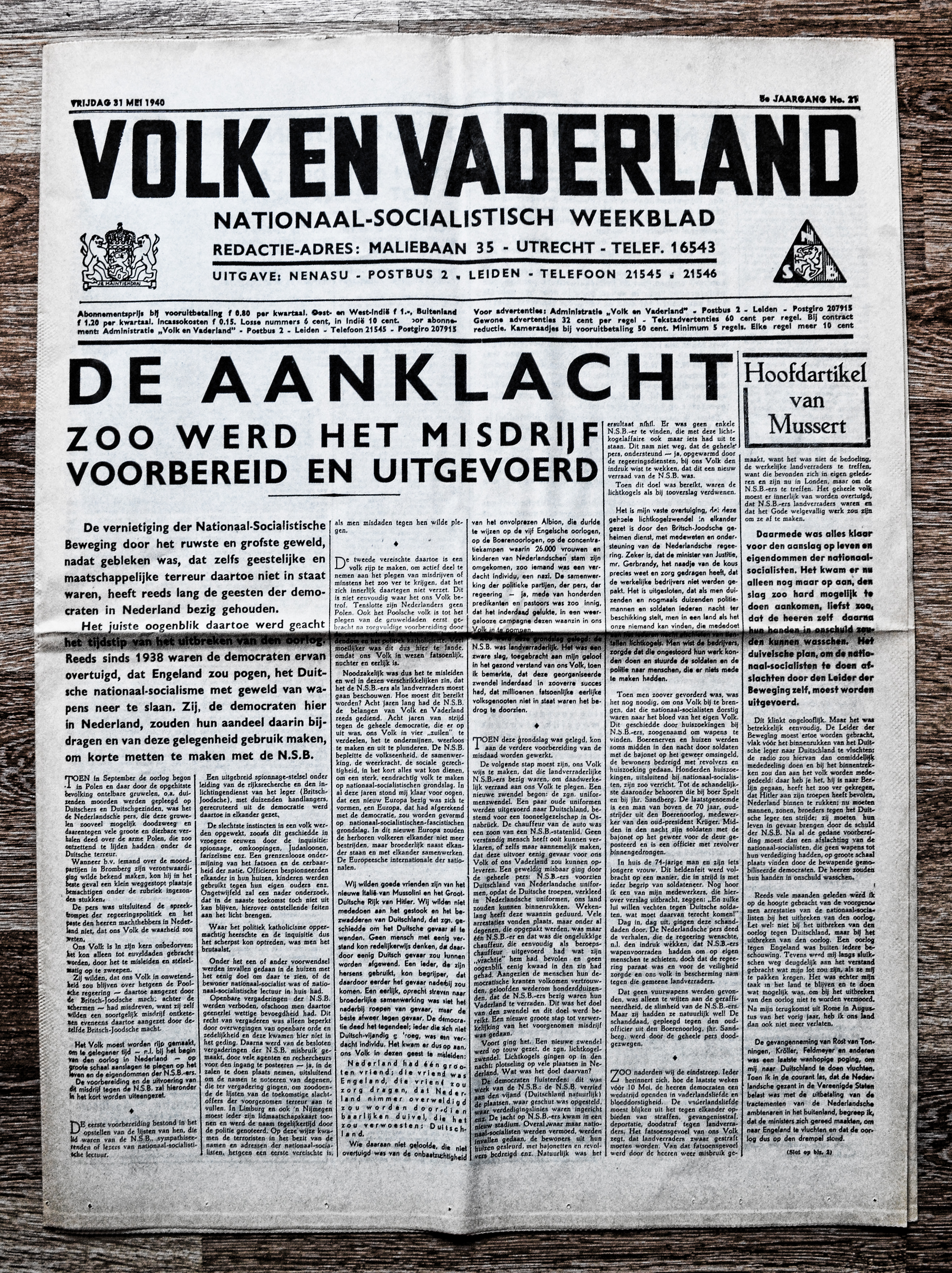

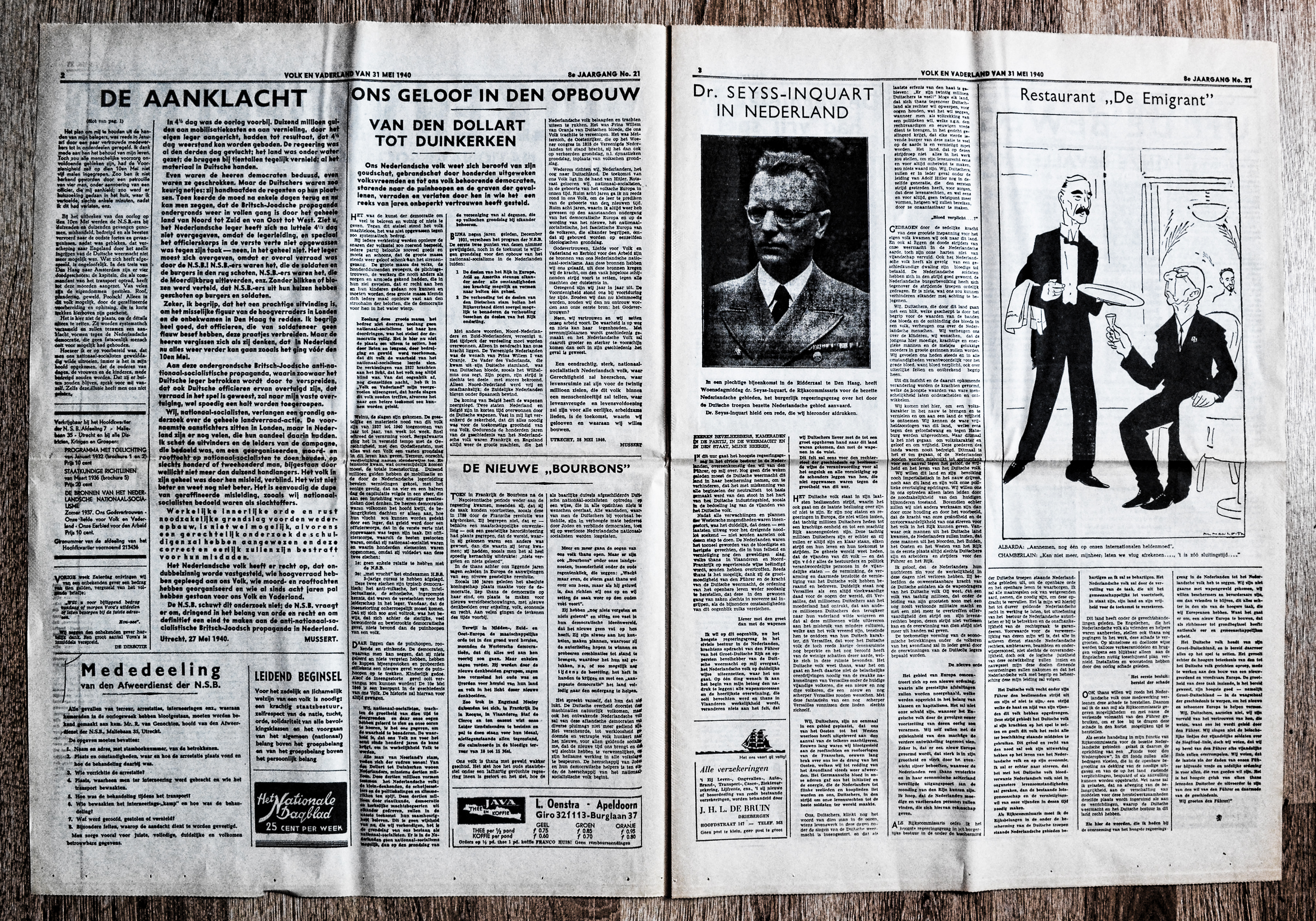

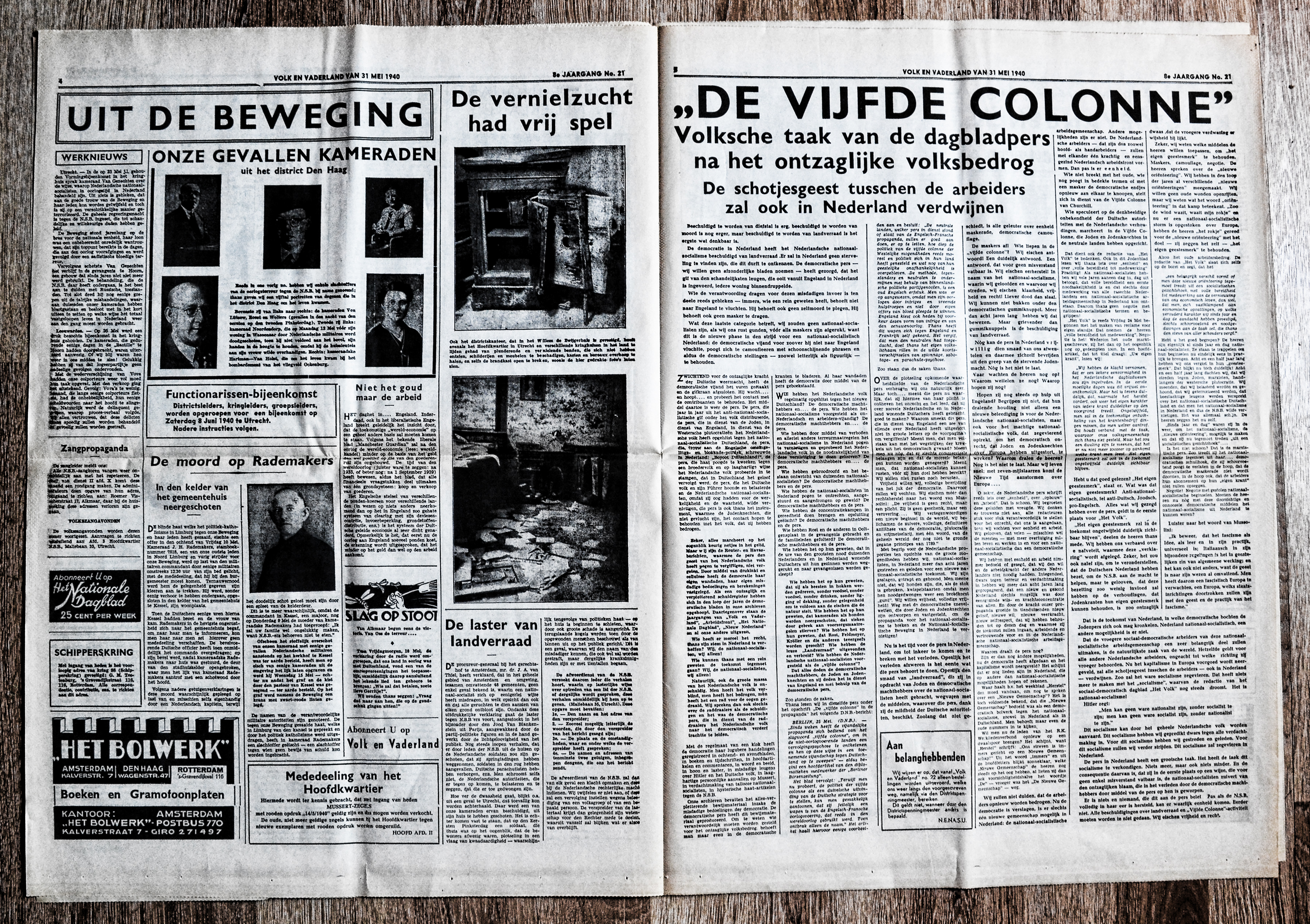

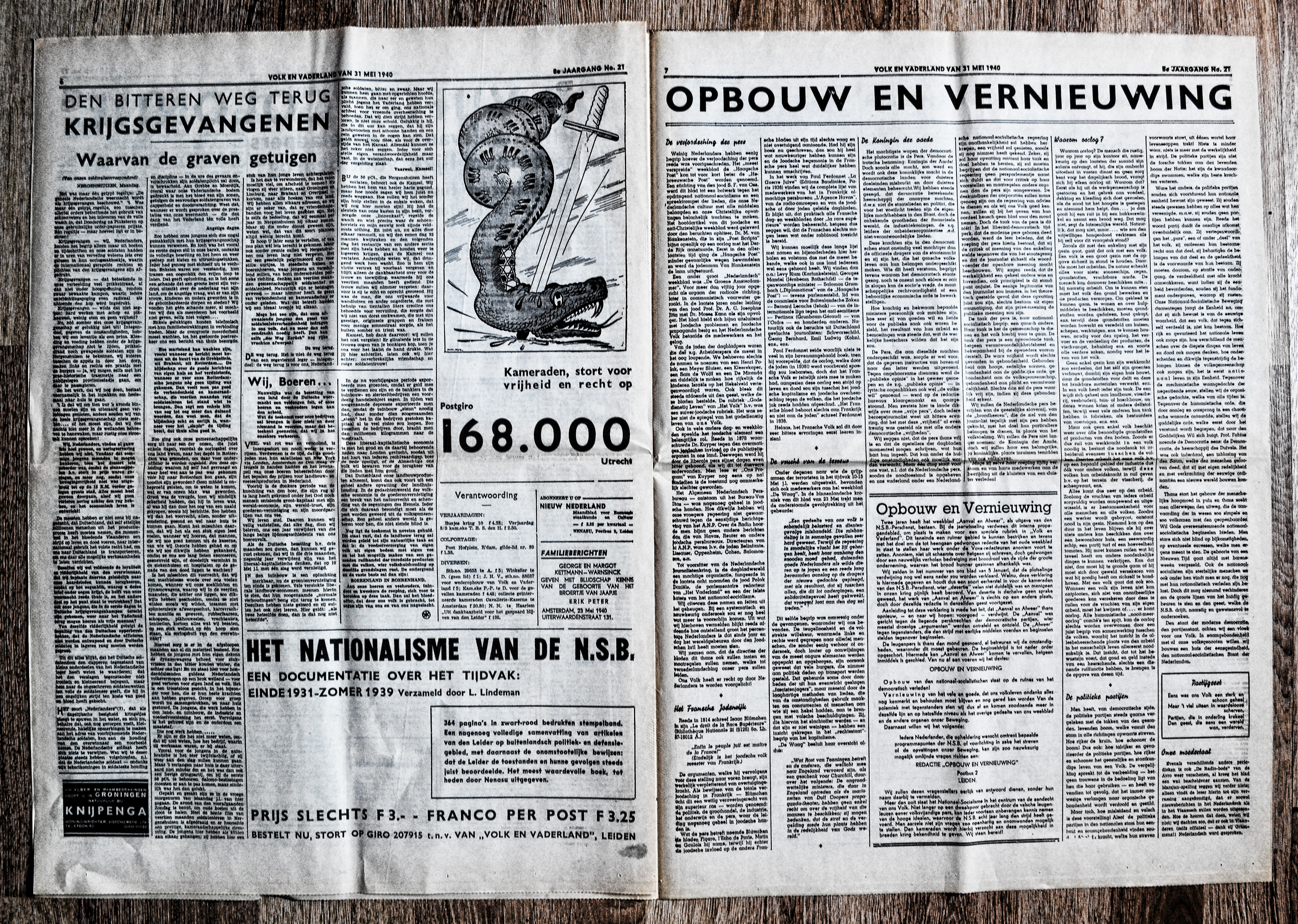

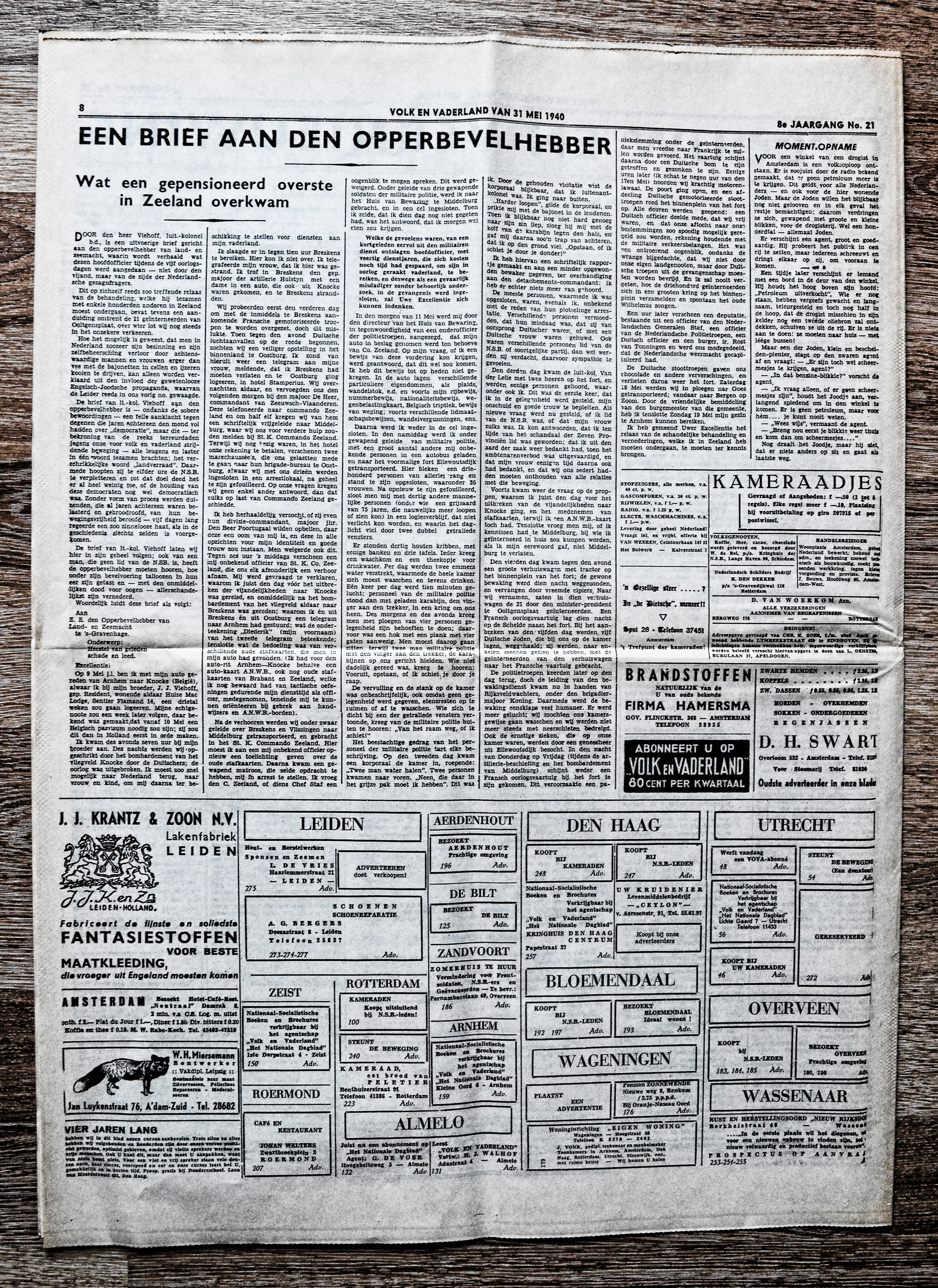
