= Alliance for National Reconstruction =

Far-right political party in the Netherlands

Alliance for National Reconstruction Verbond voor Nationaal Herstel
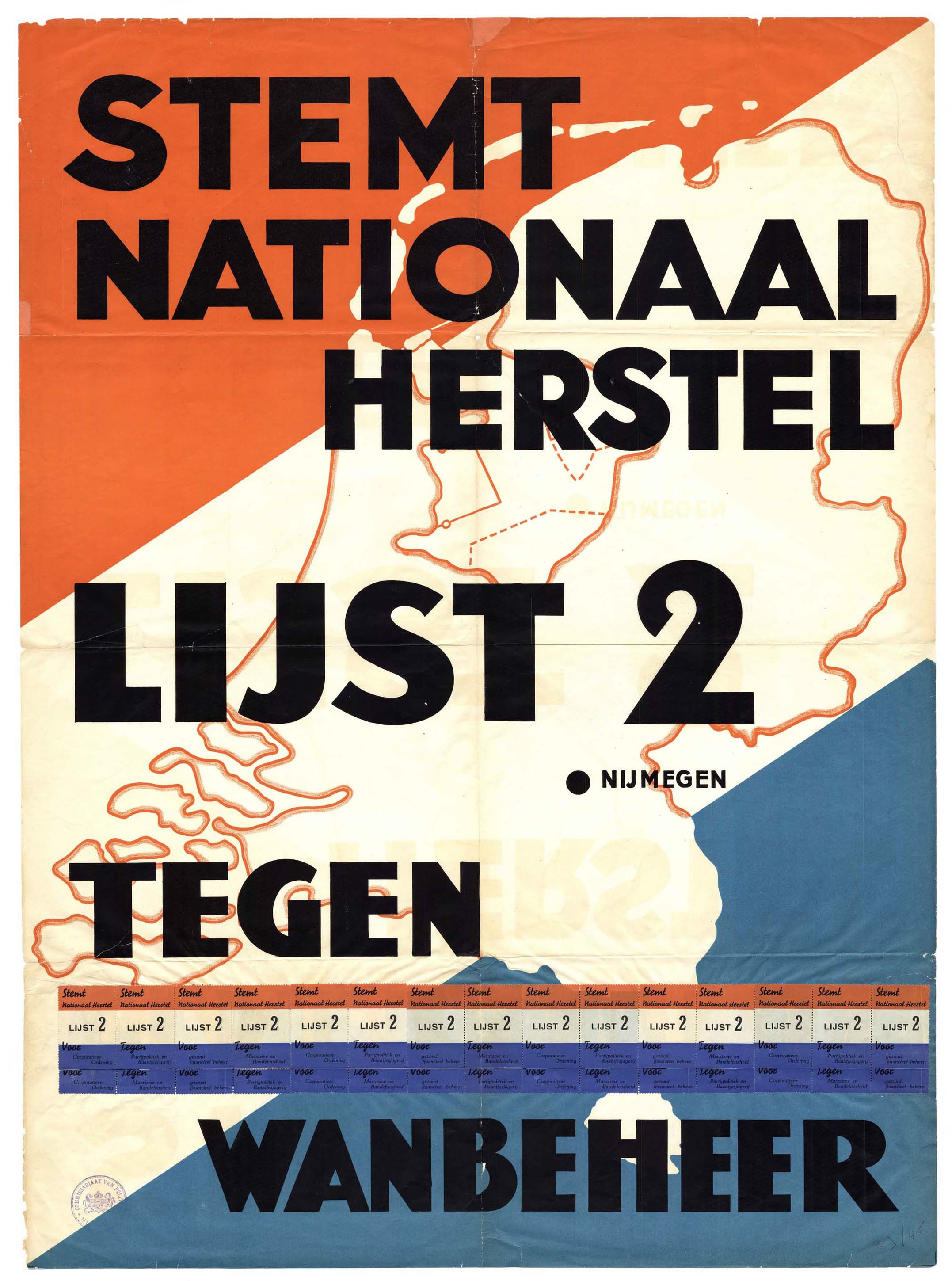
- Founder: Horace van Gybland Oosterhoff; Cornelis Jacobus Snijders
- Founded: 28 January 1933
- Banned: 19 June 1941
- Newspaper: Nationaal Herstel
- Ideology: Dutch nationalism National conservatism Imperialism; Anti-communism; Monarchism; Reactionarism
- Political position: Far-right
- Colors: Orange; White; Blue

Party flag

The Alliance for National Reconstruction (Dutch: Verbond voor Nationaal Herstel; VNH) was a conservative-nationalist political party in the Netherlands. The VNH played only a marginal role in the Dutch parliament.

== History ==
Since 1931, Van Gybland Oosterhoff had tried to unite all conservative and nationalist forces in the Netherlands. In the autumn of 1932, he founded the National Reconstruction Concentration, which was to prepare the foundation of new conservative party. On 28 January 1933 this committee founded the Alliance for National Reconstruction.

In 1933, the VNH entered in the election. Its top candidate Snijders, a former general, had already announced that he would not take his seat in parliament. He also served as the party's honorary chair. The party won one seat which was taken by the party's second candidate Westerman. After 1935, the party got considerable competition from the fascist NSB, many members advocated a merger with the NSB, wanted to steer a more conservative course. In 1937, Van Gybland Oosterhoff died, leaving the party in disarray. In the 1937 election, the party lost its seats. Most of its members left the party, some found their way to the NSB.

Since then, the VNH saw itself as a study club, which continued publishing the Nationaal Herstel ("National Reconstruction"). After the German invasion the club tried to organise a new front of national organisations. They were ignored. In 1941 the occupation government forbade the party.

== Ideology & Issues ==
The VNH operated on the border between fascism and conservative nationalism. The party thought that society was sick, because authority was no longer accepted. This gave all kinds of revolutionaries, socialists and Communists a chance to disrupt society. Political parties and the electoral system destroyed the chance of independent candidates to win seats. The party feared the rise of communism, anti-militarism and the Indonesian independence movement.

The party wanted a national reawakening, which would rekindle values like solidarity, duty, loyalty to the House of Orange and willingness to sacrifice. It wanted a new electoral system which would allow independent candidates to enter parliament. The party wanted to strengthen the relation with the Dutch colonies. It advocated national production and a strong defence. The VNH wanted to be a movement for all Dutch people, above partisan and pillarised politics.

== Election results ==
This table shows the VNH's results in elections to the House of Representatives.
| Election | Lead candidate | List | Votes | % | Seats | +/– | Government | Ref. |
|---|---|---|---|---|---|---|---|---|
| 1933 | Cornelis Jacobus Snijders | List | 30,332 | 0.8 | 1 / 100 | New | Opposition | |
| 1937 | Wilko Emmens | List | 6,059 | 0.1 | 0 / 100 | ▼1 | | |

The sole seat won by the party in 1933 was occupied by William Westerman.

== Electorate ==
The VNH was supported by civil servants and soldiers. Its electorate was concentrated in The Hague. After 1935, the electorate of the VNH became oriented to the more successful national-socialist NSB.
