= Postal codes in the Netherlands =

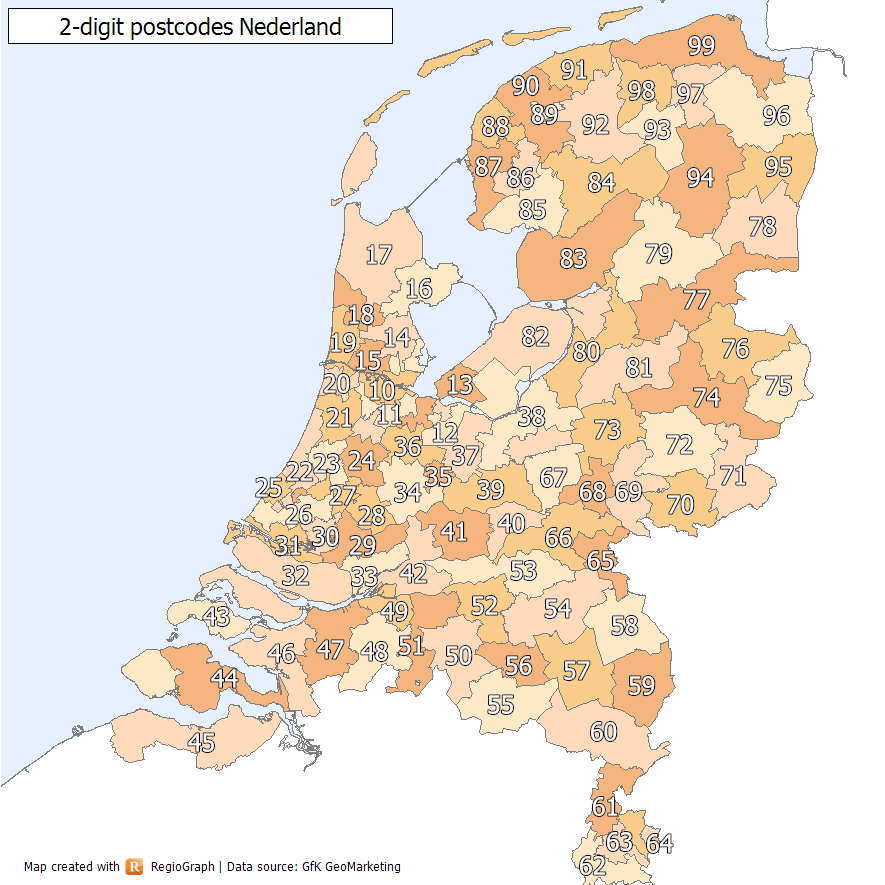
2-digit postcode areas Netherlands (defined through the first two postcode digits)

Postal codes in the Netherlands, known in Dutch as postcodes, were introduced in 1977 by the then PTT, now PostNL. They are alphanumeric, consisting of four digits followed by two uppercase letters. The letters 'F', 'I', 'O', 'Q', 'U' and 'Y' were originally not used for technical reasons, but almost all existing combinations are now used as these letters were allowed for new locations from 2005 on. The letter combinations 'SS', 'SD' and 'SA' are not used because of their associations with the Schutzstaffel, the Sicherheitsdienst and the Sturmabteilung respectively before and during the 1940-45 Nazi occupation of the Netherlands.

A postal code area (the four digits) is almost always within a single municipality, so if a village or hamlet lies on a municipal border, it usually has more than one postal code. Occasionally, two such places may share the digits of their postal code, in some cases, due to changes in village or municipality boundaries, though for practical reasons, existing postal codes are often retained.

The first two digits indicate a city and a region, the second two digits and the two letters indicate a range of house numbers, usually on the same street; on average, a Dutch postal code comprises eight single addresses, for example:

Stadhuis van Zwolle
Grote Kerkplein 15
8011 PK ZWOLLE

There are also number combinations that indicate only one street. Similarly, a postal code can cover a post office box number range:

Stadsregio Amsterdam
Postbus 626
1000 AP AMSTERDAM

Consequently, a postal address is uniquely defined by the postal code and the house number, or the PO Box number range.

There are over 575,000 postal codes in the Netherlands as of 2017.

== History ==
An initial study into the introduction of postal codes in the Netherlands began in 1970 with the introduction of the FBA code. This four-digit code was used by companies that offered subscription postage and pre-sorted mail. The FBA code was not promoted to the general public, but people were naturally familiar with their own FBA code, as it appeared on many items they received, and with some writing it on their letters, thinking the postal service would appreciate it.

In 1977, the FBA code was replaced by the definitive postal code, consisting of four digits (not the same as the FBA code) and two letters, while in 1978, the general public was encouraged to use the postal code. A national postal code guide of approximately 1,400 pages was distributed, allowing users to look up the corresponding postal code for any address. Supplements were published periodically for new streets. The postcode book could be picked up free of charge at the post office. Later, postcodes could be looked up online.

Free envelopes with postcards were available to let the sender's family, friends, and others know the postcode; the postcards could be sent postage-free.

== Caribbean Netherlands ==
The Caribbean islands of Bonaire, Sint Eustatius and Saba, which became special municipalities of the Netherlands in 2010, do not as yet have postal codes; the address, the town and the island are sufficient for sending post to either island (with "Caribbean Netherlands" as country when sent from abroad). However, following a consultation in the islands in 2024, the Dutch government announced plans to introduce postal codes on the islands similar in format to those used in the European Netherlands. This was to be introduced by the end of 2026. The introduction of postal codes was to make it easier to order products online and also improve the delivery of letters or cards. In addition, researchers believe that standardizing the postal code system will promote equality between the European and Caribbean Netherlands.

In the consultation, it was envisaged that the Caribbean Netherlands would be assigned postal codes in the series 0000 AA to 0999 ZZ. As a result, at the request of the Ministry of Housing and Spatial Planning, PostNL has reserved postal code range 0000-0999 for use on the islands, following an amendment to the postcode covenant, announced in the Staatscourant or Government Gazette.

Other proposals were using postal codes in the range 9191 AA to 9199 ZZ and using a separate system for the Caribbean Netherlands.
