= Alfred Emile Rambaldo =

Dutch aviator (1879-1911)

- Born: November 16, 1879; Rembang, Java, Dutch East Indies
- Died: August 5, 1911; Ngeboer (near Blora), Java, Dutch East Indies
- Occupations: Naval officer, meteorologist, aviation pioneer

Alfred Emile Rambaldo (November 16, 1879 – August 5, 1911) was a Dutch naval officer, meteorologist, and aviation pioneer.

== Biography ==
Rambaldo was the son of a colonial resident of Rembang, later of Pasuruan in the former Dutch East Indies. At the age of four, he and his parents moved to the Netherlands, where his father died. He studied at the J.D.N. de Graaff Institute in The Hague, and later at the Naval Institute in Willemsoord. On September 21, 1901, he graduated as a first-class midshipman and returned to the Dutch East Indies.

In 1903, he was promoted to second lieutenant at sea. In 1905 he returned to the Netherlands. There, he was assigned to the Royal Netherlands Marine Corps in Amsterdam, where he reconnected with his former teacher Samuel Pierre l'Honoré Naber. Through this contact, he rekindled his interest in astronomy, meteorology, and especially the emerging field of aviation.

In 1907, Rambaldo published four articles highlighting the military value of airships and tethered balloons. At that time, the Wright brothers had only recently made their first powered flights, and Rambaldo remained skeptical about the practicality of airplanes.

Encouraged by positive responses to his writings, he attended the Commission Permanente Internationale d'Aéronautique congress in Brussels, where he made many connections. That same year, he gave a lecture at the Royal Dutch Geographical Society in Amsterdam titled "Airship Navigation in Support of Scientific Research in the Dutch East Indies." This became the catalyst for founding the Association for the Promotion of Airship Navigation on October 19, 1907, later renamed the Royal Netherlands Aviation Association. Rambaldo became its secretary, while Colonel C.J. Snijders served as chairman.

On April 4, 1908, Rambaldo convinced his colleague Kurt Wegener to take a balloon flight from The Hague. He soon paused his association work to study aerology at the Meteorological Observatory Lindenberg under Richard Assmann. During this time, he also visited the Zeppelin factory in Friedrichshafen, Germany.

In August 1908, Rambaldo sailed aboard HNLMS De Ruyter to the West Indies, conducting high-altitude atmospheric research. He continued this work during his subsequent deployment to the Dutch East Indies. In Batavia, he was assigned to the Royal Magnetic and Meteorological Observatory, where he continued his studies and founded the Dutch East Indies Association for Aviation.

On February 26, 1910, he and several others conducted the first balloon flight in the Dutch East Indies. A subsequent flight took place over Surabaya, where Rambaldo witnessed Gijs Küller make the first powered flight in the region. However, Rambaldo himself could not participate due to weight limitations.

In July 1911, he was scheduled to return to the Netherlands, but due to lack of space, his departure was delayed by a month. In the meantime, he undertook another balloon flight, which proved fatal. En route from Surabaya to Semarang, the balloon made an emergency landing near Blora and became entangled in a tree canopy. As he exited the basket, Rambaldo fell ten meters and died instantly.

== Legacy ==
- A bust memorial of Rambaldo was originally placed in Surabaya, later moved to Valkenburg Naval Air Base and now located at De Kooy Airfield.
