= 1937 Dutch general election =

- 26 May 1937
- All 100 seats in the House of Representatives; 51 seats needed for a majority
- Turnout: 94.40% (▼0.10pp)
Party	Leader	Vote %	Seats	+/–
RKSP	Piet Aalberse	28.84	31	+3
SDAP	Johan Willem Albarda	21.95	23	+1
ARP	Hendrikus Colijn	16.40	17	+3
CHU	Dirk Jan de Geer	7.46	8	−2
VDB	Pieter Oud	5.90	6	0
NSB	Anton Mussert	4.22	4	New
LSP	Willem Carel Wendelaar	3.95	4	−3
CPN	Louis de Visser	3.35	3	−1
CDU	Harm van Houten	2.09	2	+1
SGP	Gerrit Hendrik Kersten	1.94	2	−1
This lists parties that won seats. See the complete results below.
Most voted-for party by municipality
Cabinet before	Cabinet after
Third Colijn cabinet RKSP–ARP–CHU–LSP–VDB	Fourth Colijn cabinet RKSP–ARP–CHU

General elections were held in the Netherlands on 26 May 1937. The Roman Catholic State Party remained the largest party in the House of Representatives, winning 31 of the 100 seats. Due to the outbreak of World War II two years later, the next general elections were not held until 1946.

The 1937 Senate election took place a day after the general election.

== Results ==
Party	Votes	%	Seats	+/–
Roman Catholic State Party	1,170,431	28.84	31	+3
Social Democratic Workers' Party	890,661	21.95	23	+1
Anti-Revolutionary Party	665,501	16.40	17	+3
Christian Historical Union	302,829	7.46	8	–2
Free-thinking Democratic League	239,502	5.90	6	0
National Socialist Movement	171,137	4.22	4	New
Liberal State Party	160,260	3.95	4	–3
Communist Party of the Netherlands	136,026	3.35	3	–1
Christian Democratic Union	85,004	2.09	2	+1
Reformed Political Party	78,619	1.94	2	–1
Revolutionary Socialist Party	32,846	0.81	0	–1
Catholic Democratic Party	27,665	0.68	0	New
Hervormd Gereformeerde Staatspartij	24,543	0.60	0	–1
Actie Bouwman	21,191	0.52	0	New
Christian National Action	20,487	0.50	0	New
General Interest	9,038	0.22	0	New
Dutch People's Fascism "Black Front"	8,178	0.20	0	New
National Farmers', Horticulturists' and Middle Class Party	6,891	0.17	0	–1
Alliance for National Reconstruction	6,270	0.15	0	–1
National Socialist Dutch Workers Party	998	0.02	0	New
Total	4,058,077	100.00	100	0
Valid votes	4,058,077	96.32		
Invalid/blank votes	154,826	3.68		
Total votes	4,212,903	100.00		
Registered voters/turnout	4,462,859	94.40		
Source: CBS, Kiesraad

== See also ==
- List of candidates in the 1937 Dutch general election
- Pillarisation
