= Henk Walaardt Sacré =

Dutch military engineer

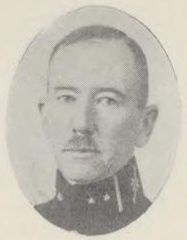
Walaardt Sacré

Paul Hendrik "Henk" Walaardt Sacré (11 October 1873 – 1949) was a Dutch military engineer and aviator born in Doetinchem.

His father, Lodewijk Ægidius Walaardt Sacré, was a navy officer. In 1889 he was accepted into the Royal Military Academy, where he became a military engineer. In 1894 he finished his education and was made second lieutenant, afterwards serving with the engineer corps in Utrecht. In 1898 he became a staff officer on the 1st Engineering-Commandement in Utrecht, later moving to Breda where he was promoted to lieutenant and in 1905 to captain. In 1899, he married Marie Clelie Gertrude Bake but had no children. In 1907 he was made commander of a regiment and in 1908 he got the ancillary position of commanding the Air Force of his regiment and the ballons used for artillery practice. He was also a member of the main board of the Dutch Association for Aviation. Deputy chief of the general staff Cornelis Snijders requested him to specialize in military aviation, in 1909 this was made his fulltime job. He studied the organization of the balloon force, read modern aviation literature and studied abroad, attaining his brevet as balloon commandant in Germany and his pilots license in France. He used his knowledge to schools air balloon officers for the Dutch Army. When in 1910 the Military Aviation Commission was founded Sacré became both member and secretary. In July 1913 the Military Aviation Branch was created, stationed at Soesterberg, and Walaardt Sacré was made its first commander. Under Walaardt Sacre’s leadership the branch expanded to 650 men and 7 airfields. In 1917 he is promoted to major. As he was to be replaced as leader of the Aviation Branch he left the army in 1919 and joined the Air Transport Service of the Netherlands-English Technical Trading Society In 1922 Walaardt Sacré founded N.V. Nationale Vliegtuig-Industrie in order to break up the monopoly of Anton Fokker but by 1926 the firm was closed. His next project was setting up a commercial flight rout between the Americas and the Netherlands, after the Hindenburg Disaster these plans were permanently shelved. He was also a member of the State Commission on Aviation, an advisory body of the Dutch government, from 1919 to 1930.

Walaardt Sacré Park bears his name.
