= Max de Marchant et d'Ansembourg =

Dutch fascist politician (1894–1975)

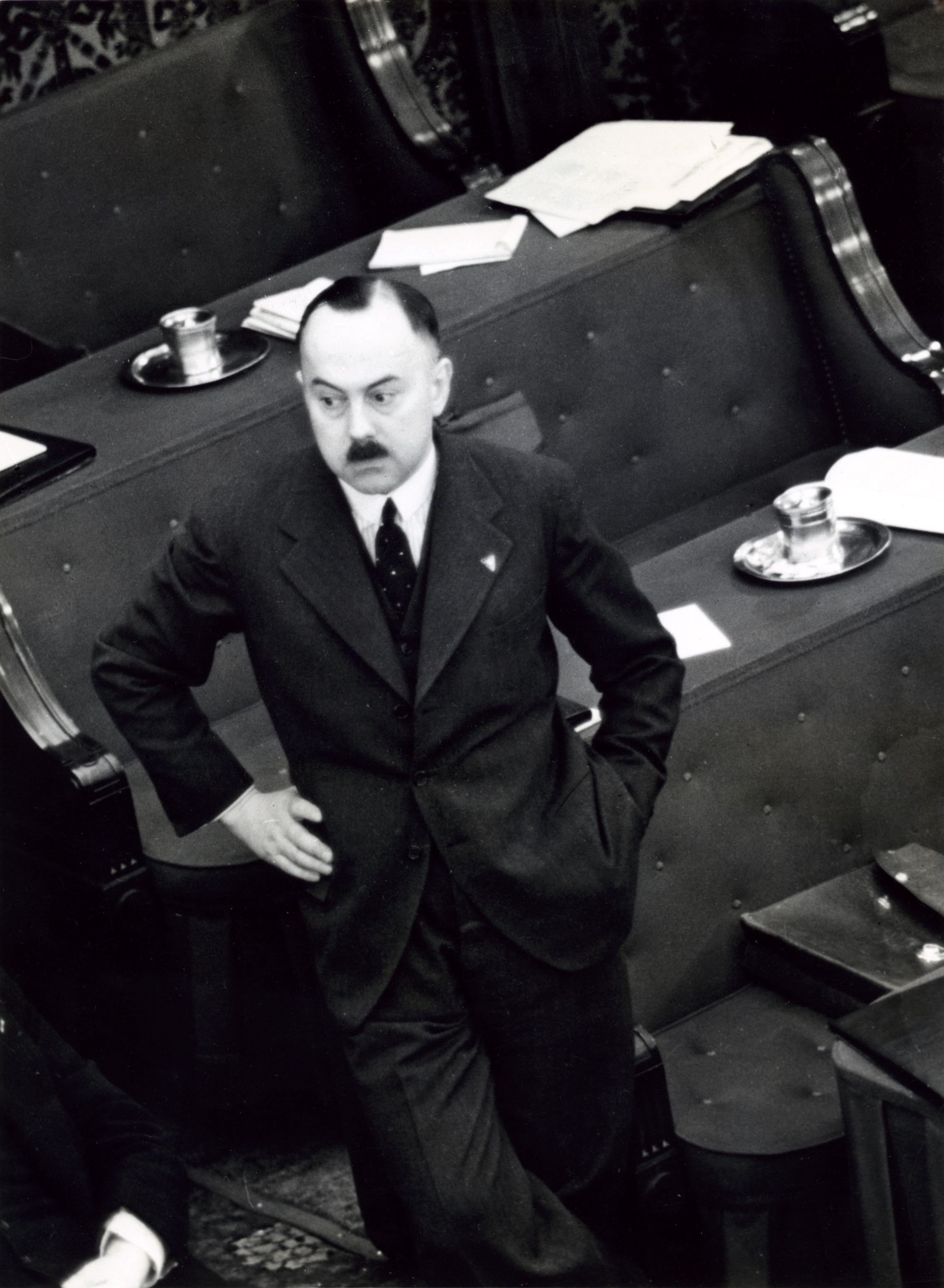
- Max de Marchant et d'Ansembourg in 1937

Member of the Senate
- In office 18 December 1935 – 8 June 1937

Member of the House of Representatives
- In office 8 June 1937 – 1 February 1941

Commissioner of Limburg
- In office 1 February 1941 – 6 September 1944
- Preceded by: Willem van Sonsbeeck
- Succeeded by: Willem van Sonsbeeck

Personal details
- Born: Maximilianus Victor Eugène Hubertus Josef Maria graaf de Marchant et d'Ansembourg; 18 January 1894 Gulpen, Netherlands
- Died: 24 January 1975 (aged 81) Heerlen, Netherlands
- Party: RKSP (until 1933); NSB (1933–1945)
- Spouse: Myriam Therese Selimé Aimée Guarda Elisabeth Josef Hubertus Freiin von Fürstenberg (m. 1930)
- Children: 5

Maximilianus Victor Eugène Hubertus Josef Maria "Max" graaf de Marchant et d'Ansembourg (18 January 1894 – 24 January 1975) was a Dutch aristocrat, politician and collaborator with the German occupation of the Netherlands. As a member of the National Socialist Movement (NSB), he served in the Senate from 1935 to 1937 and in the House of Representatives from 1937 to 1941. During the German occupation of the Netherlands, he was Commissioner of Limburg from 1941 to 1944.

== Early life ==
Max de Marchant et d'Ansembourg was born on 18 January 1894 in Gulpen into an aristocratic family of Belgian origins. His father Iwan de Marchant et d'Ansembourg was a conservative Catholic member of the House of Representatives between 1891 and 1897. After completing his secondary education at a Jesuit school in Sittard, de Marchant et d'Ansembourg moved to Germany in 1913 to study at a German gymnasium, after which he studied law at the University of Münster. He had already become a Prussian citizen the year prior. During World War I, he served in the German army, rising to the rank of Oberleutnant.

== Political career ==
De Marchant et d'Ansembourg returned to the Netherlands in 1919, and worked for several banks and the State Mines before being appointed mayor of Amstenrade in 1925. In 1927, he was elected to the Provincial Council of Limburg as a member of the Roman Catholic State Party (RKSP), which he would remain until 1931.

In the early 1930s, de Marchant et d'Ansembourg would develop sympathies for Nazism, and joined the National Socialist Movement (NSB) in 1933, where he was seen as a valuable recruit on account of his aristocratic background and foreign connections. Due to a ban on government employees being members of the NSB, he was forced to step down as mayor in 1934. He was appointed by NSB leader Anton Mussert as a foreign representative for the party, and undertook several failed attempts to reconcile with the Catholic Church until a pastoral letter in 1936 banned Catholics from joining the NSB.

In 1935, de Marchant et d'Ansembourg was once again elected to the Limburg provincial council, this time as a NSB member. He would only serve in this position for a few months before being elected to the Senate in September 1935, taking up his seat in December after concerns about his citizenship status. In 1937, he moved to the House of Representatives, where he became the NSB's parliamentary leader. As an MP, he primarily sought to use his parliamentary work as a means to undermine the democratic system and expose its perceived failures, when the House rejected his motion to abolish the vehicle tax he claimed it showed its disregard for the will of the people. He was seen by many as a demagogue, though to a lesser extent than his colleague Meinoud Rost van Tonningen, who in 1937 took over his tasks relating to communications with the NSDAP. He nevertheless frequently came into conflict with the Speaker of the House of Representatives over his unparliamentary comments.

== World War II and later life ==
When Rost van Tonningen was interned on 3 May 1940, de Marchant et d'Ansembourg once again became responsible for the NSB's international relations. During the first months of the occupation, he became a more important figure within the party, being tasked with maintaining contact with the German occupation forces, but gradually saw his influence wane. In February 1941, he was appointed as Commissioner for the province of Limburg. He quickly came into conflict with local administrators after a speech on 12 August 1941 introducing the Führerprinzip principle on the provincial level led to the resignation of 44 mayors. This was followed by the creation of blacklists for opponents of the NSB. When Allied forces began to reach Limburg in 1944, de Marchant et d'Ansembourg fled with his family to Germany, where he was captured by Allied soldiers in the spring of 1945. In 1946, he was tried and was sentenced to fifteen years in prison despite prosecutors seeking the death penalty, as the courts did not consider him as enough of a leading figure within the NSB. He was freed in 1954, and retreated from public life to focus on managing his estate.

Max de Marchant et d'Ansembourg died on 24 January 1975 in Heerlen.
