= 1932 Dutch Senate election =

- 29 July 1932
- 25 of the 50 seats in the Senate; 26 seats needed for a majority
Party	Leader	Vote %	Seats	+/–
RKSP		20.31	16	0
SDAP		22.75	11	0
CHU		14.47	7	0
ARP		16.25	6	0
LSP		13.86	6	0
VDB		7.00	4	0
This lists parties that won seats. See the complete results below.
President of the Senate before	President of the Senate after
Willem Lodewijk de Vos van Steenwijk; CHU	Willem Lodewijk de Vos van Steenwijk; CHU

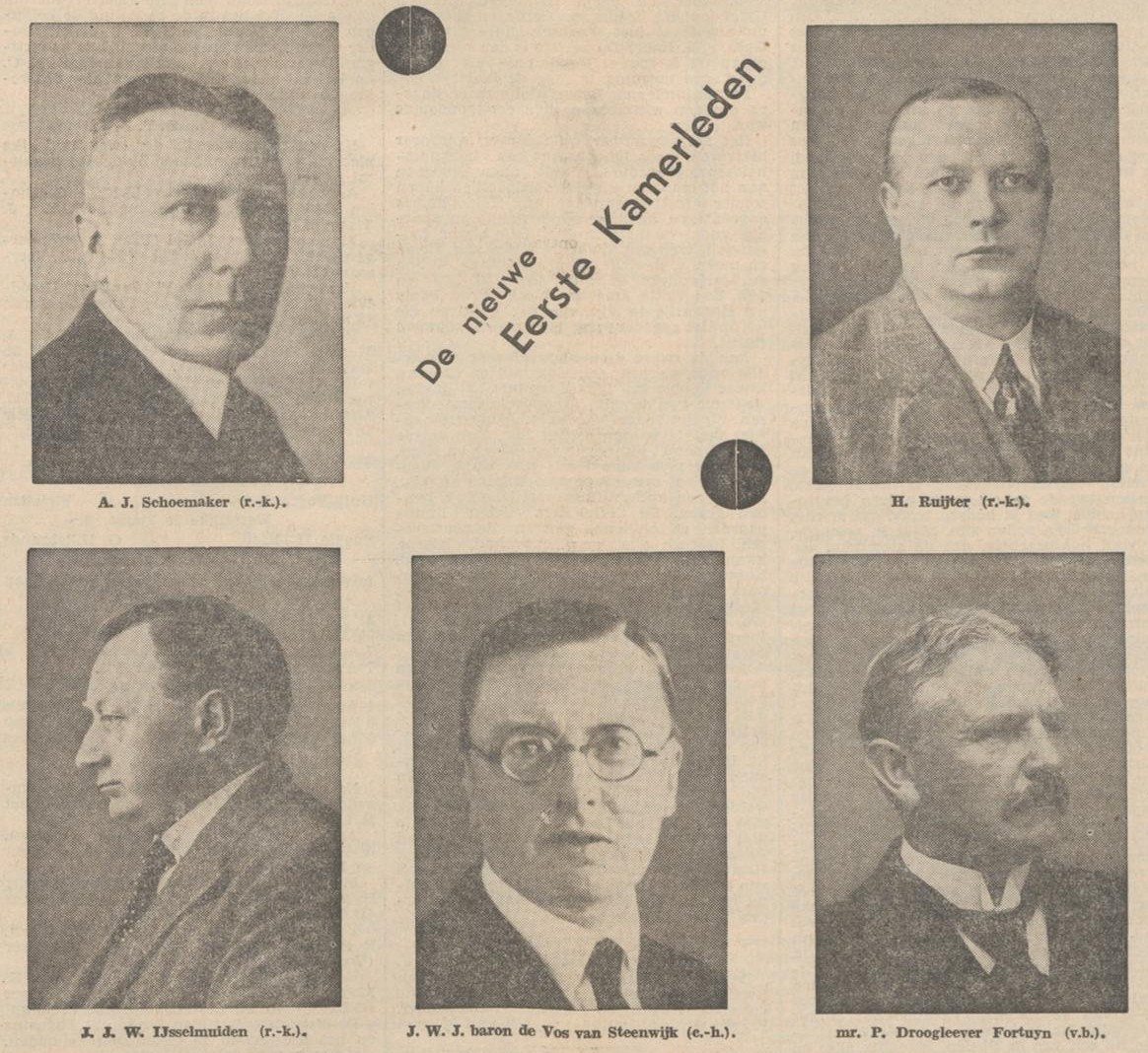
A selection of elected Senators

Elections for 25 out of 50 seats in the Senate of the Netherlands were held on 29 July 1932. All seats in electoral group II comprising the provinces of Gelderland, Overijssel, Groningen and Drenthe, and electoral group IV comprising the province of South Holland, were up for election.

Within each electoral group, Senators were elected by provincial councils using party-list proportional representation. Provincial councillors' votes were weighted to their province's population.

No seats changed hands in the election, and the incumbent Coalition government retained its majority of 30 seats.

== Results ==
1932 Senate election
Party	Unweighted		Weighted		Seats			
Party	Votes	%	Votes	%	Won	Not up	Total	+/−
Social Democratic Workers' Party	63	23.51	7,806	22.75	6	5	11	0
Roman Catholic State Party	51	19.03	6,967	20.31	5	11	16	0
Anti-Revolutionary Party	45	16.79	5,576	16.25	4	2	6	0
Christian Historical Union	39	14.55	4,963	14.47	4	3	7	0
Liberal State Party	37	13.81	4,755	13.86	4	2	6	0
Free-thinking Democratic League	21	7.84	2,400	7.00	2	2	4	0
Reformed Political Party	6	2.24	1,047	3.05	0	0	0	0
Communist Party of Holland	6	2.24	795	2.32	0	0	0	New
Total	268	100.00	34,309	100.00	25	25	50	0
Valid votes	268	100.00	34,309	100.00				
Invalid/blank votes	0	0.00	0	0.00				
Total votes	268	100.00	34,309	100.00				
Registered voters/turnout	271	98.89	34,786	98.63				
Source: Staatscourant

=== By electoral group ===
1932 Senate election in electoral group II
Party	Unweighted		Weighted		Seats	+/–
Party	Votes	%	Votes	%	Seats	+/–
Social Democratic Workers' Party	45	23.94	4,062	22.99	3	0
Roman Catholic State Party	36	19.15	3,847	21.77	3	0
Anti-Revolutionary Party	32	17.02	2,872	16.25	2	0
Christian Historical Union	28	14.89	2,675	15.14	2	0
Liberal State Party	25	13.30	2,259	12.79	2	0
Free-thinking Democratic League	16	8.51	1,360	7.70	1	0
Communist Party of Holland	4	2.13	379	2.14	0	New
Reformed Political Party	2	1.06	215	1.22	0	0
Total	188	100.00	17,669	100.00	13	0
Valid votes	188	100.00	17,669	100.00		
Invalid/blank votes	0	0.00	0	0.00		
Total votes	188	100.00	17,669	100.00		
Registered voters/turnout	189	99.47	17,730	99.66		
Source: Staatscourant

1932 Senate election in electoral group IV
Party	Unweighted		Weighted		Seats	+/–
Party	Votes	%	Votes	%	Seats	+/–
Social Democratic Workers' Party	18	22.50	3,744	22.50	3	0
Roman Catholic State Party	15	18.75	3,120	18.75	2	0
Anti-Revolutionary Party	13	16.25	2,704	16.25	2	0
Liberal State Party	12	15.00	2,496	15.00	2	0
Christian Historical Union	11	13.75	2,288	13.75	2	0
Free-thinking Democratic League	5	6.25	1,040	6.25	1	0
Reformed Political Party	4	5.00	832	5.00	0	0
Communist Party of Holland	2	2.50	416	2.50	0	New
Total	80	100.00	16,640	100.00	12	0
Valid votes	80	100.00	16,640	100.00		
Invalid/blank votes	0	0.00	0	0.00		
Total votes	80	100.00	16,640	100.00		
Registered voters/turnout	82	97.56	17,056	97.56		
Source: Staatscourant
