= Willem Carel Wendelaar =

Dutch politician (1882–1967)

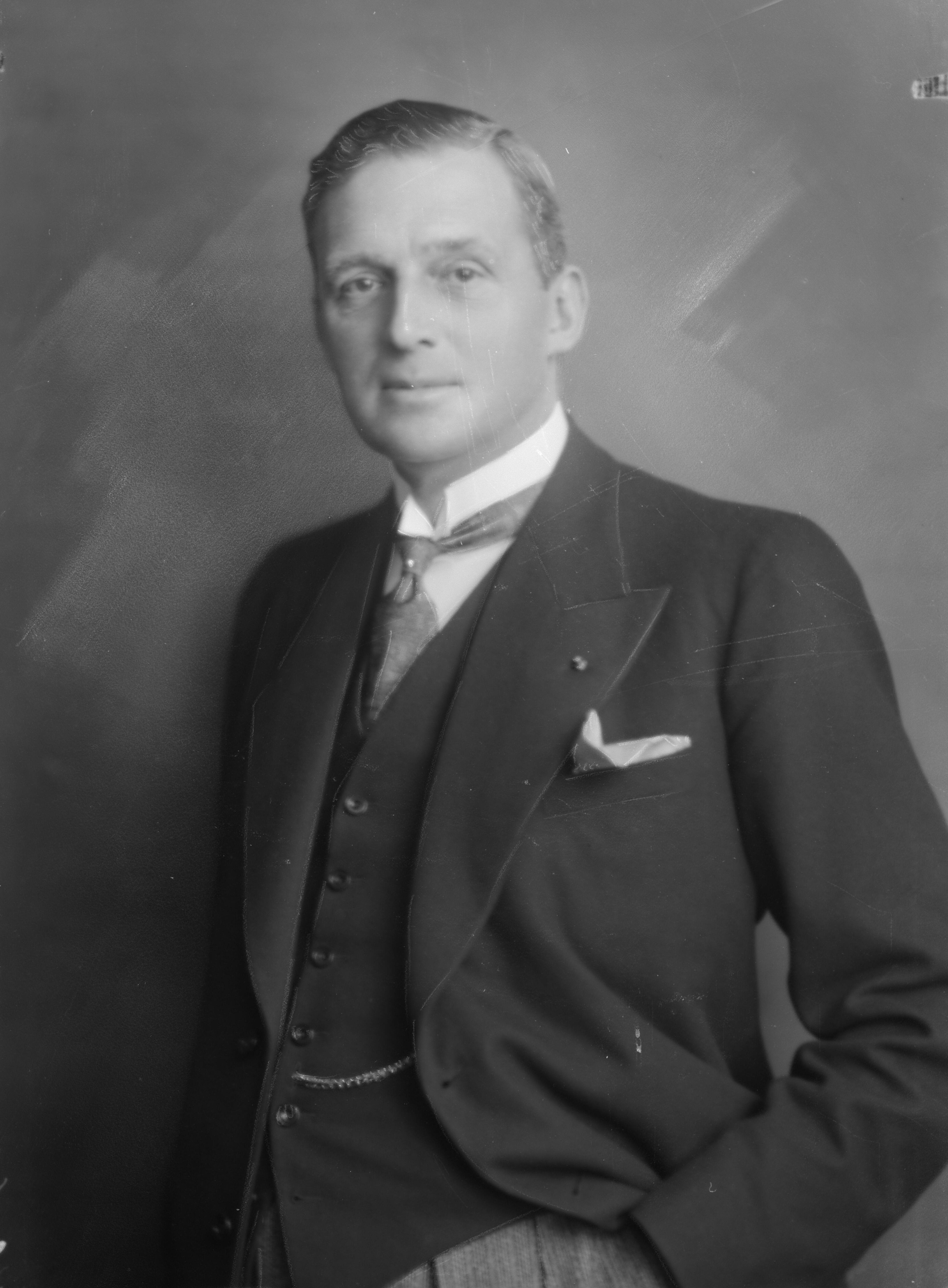
- Willem Carel Wendelaar in 1930

Member of the House of Representatives
- In office 12 October 1933 – 4 June 1946

Member of the Senate
- In office 25 August 1948 – 6 November 1956

Mayor of Alkmaar
- In office 1 December 1919 – 16 January 1934
- Preceded by: Gerard Ripping
- Succeeded by: François Henri van Kinschot

Personal details
- Born: 1 January 1882 Amsterdam, Netherlands
- Died: 1 October 1967 (aged 85) The Hague, Netherlands
- Party: LSP (until 1946); PvdV (1946-1948); VVD (1948-1967)
- Spouse: Adriana Marie Anna Müller
- Children: 2
- Education: Utrecht University

Willem Carel Wendelaar (1 January 1882 – 1 October 1967) was a Dutch liberal politician. He was mayor of Alkmaar from 1919 to 1934, and served in the Dutch House of Representatives from 1933 to 1946 and in the Senate from 1948 to 1956. He was a member first of the Liberal State Party (LSP), serving as its chairman from 1933 to 1938, and later of the Freedom Party (PvdV) and the People's Party for Freedom and Democracy (VVD).

== Biography ==
Willem Carel Wendelaar was born on 1 January 1882 in Amsterdam to Willem Gerrit Wendelaar and Elisabeth Jeanette Christine Serlé. After completing his secondary education at the Barlaeus Gymnasium in Amsterdam, Wendelaar studied law at Utrecht University. He worked for some time as a lawyer in Utrecht, and in 1912 he entered the civil service, including working for the Ministry of War for a period.

In 1919, Wendelaar was appointed as mayor of Alkmaar. During his tenure, Wendelaar became popular among the inhabitants of Alkmaar, and in 1931 he was awarded a monumental lantern by its citizenry. He succeeded Dirk Fock as chairman of the Liberal State Party (LSP) in 1933.

That same year, Wendelaar became a member of the House of Representatives. As an MP, Wendelaar focused on matters including justice, Surinamese affairs, education, internal affairs and housing. Politically, he was relatively conservative, which contributed to the LSP's decline during the 1930s and its loss in the 1937 Dutch general election. Although he won re-election as party chairman in 1938, he chose to step down in favor of Ben Telders.

Wendelaar was an outspoken opponent of Nazism. At a gathering in Amsterdam on 4 March 1936, Wendelaar publicly burned a copy of Der Stürmer. He also led an organization aimed at furthering public education during this period.

In 1946, Wendelaar left the House of Representatives and in 1948 he became a member of the Senate, first for the short-lived Freedom Party and later for the People's Party for Freedom and Democracy (VVD). In 1951, he managed to convince Dirk Stikker to remain in politics and return as minister of foreign affairs, despite Stikker's previous opposition to Wendelaar's continued membership of the House of Representatives. In 1956, Wendelaar retired from the Senate, seeing himself as unable to perform the duties of his office.

Wendelaar was married to Adriana Marie Anna Müller, a concert singer, with whom he had two children. He was an officer in the Order of Orange-Nassau, and a knight in the Order of the Netherlands Lion.

Willem Carel Wendelaar died on 1 October 1967 in The Hague.

== Bibliography ==
- Vonhoff, H.J.L. (1998). Liberalen onder een dak (in Dutch). Sdu Uitgevers. ISBN 9789012085816.
