= 1935 Dutch Senate election =

Netherlands Senate election

- 26 July 1935
- 25 of the 50 seats in the Senate; 26 seats needed for a majority
Party	Leader	Vote %	Seats	+/–
RKSP		42.12	16	0
SDAP		19.70	11	0
ARP		7.75	6	0
NSB		7.34	2	New
CHU		5.88	6	−1
LSP		4.14	5	−1
VDB		4.31	3	−1
CHU−ARP joint list		3.29	1	New
This lists parties that won seats. See the complete results below.
President of the Senate before	President of the Senate after
Willem Lodewijk de Vos van Steenwijk; CHU	Willem Lodewijk de Vos van Steenwijk; CHU

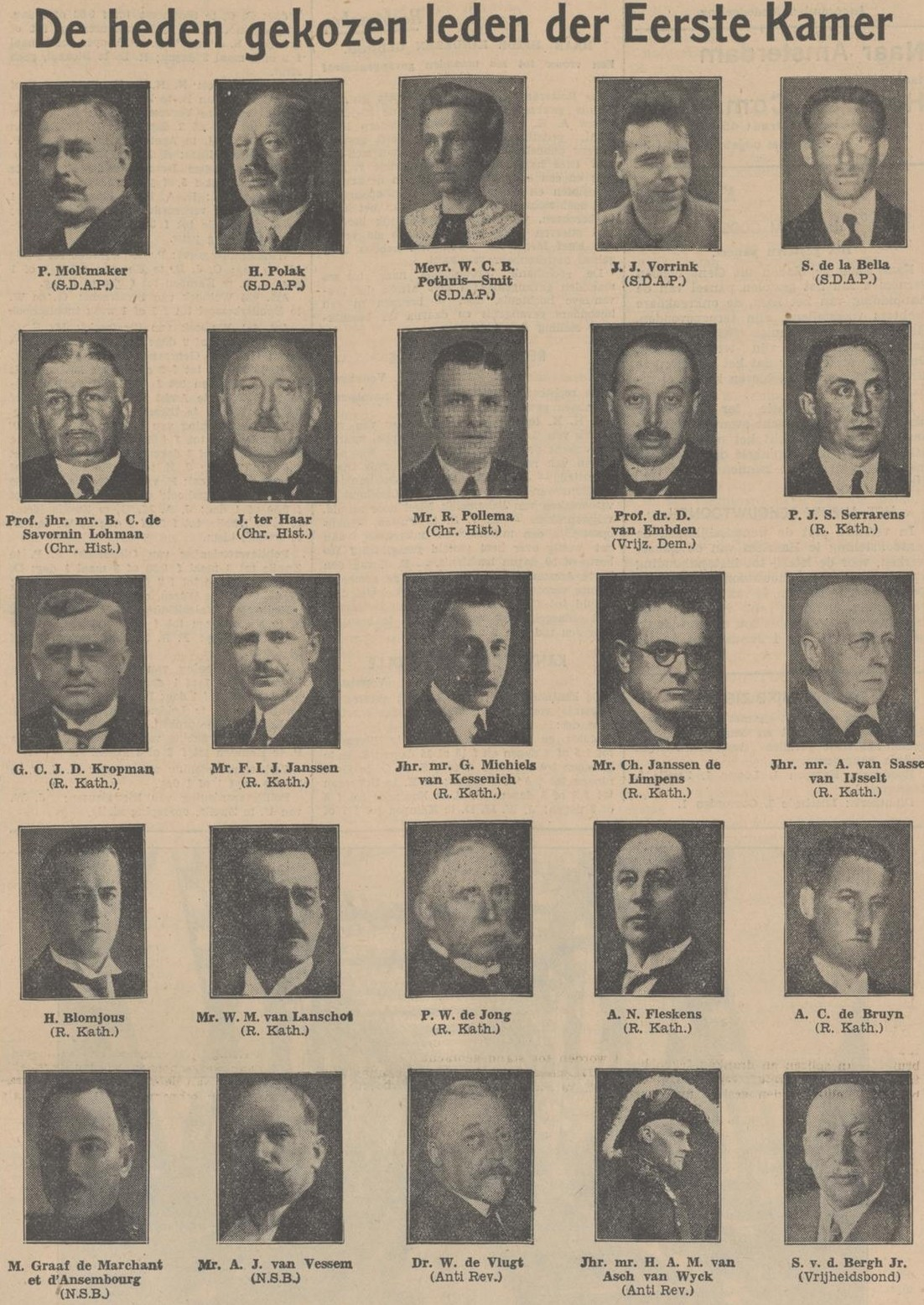
Elected Senators

Elections for 25 out of 50 seats in the Senate of the Netherlands were held on 26 July 1935. All seats in electoral group I comprising the provinces of North Brabant, Zeeland, Utrecht and Limburg, and electoral group III comprising the provinces of North Holland and Friesland, were up for election.

Within each electoral group, Senators were elected by provincial councils using party-list proportional representation. Provincial councillors' votes were weighted to their province's population.

The election saw the incumbent government's majority shrink from 39 to 37 seats, with the Liberal State Party and the Free-thinking Democratic League losing one seat each. The Anti-Revolutionary Party and the Christian Historical Union contested the election with a joint list in the province of Friesland in group III. The list won one seat, which was allocated to a CHU candidate. The National Socialist Movement entered the Senate for the first time with two seats.

== Results ==
1935 Senate election
Party	Unweighted		Weighted		Seats			
Party	Votes	%	Votes	%	Won	Not up	Total	+/−
Roman Catholic State Party	126	40.65	16,384	42.12	11	5	16	0
Social Democratic Workers' Party	58	18.71	7,663	19.70	5	6	11	0
Anti-Revolutionary Party	25	8.06	3,013	7.75	2	4	6	0
National Socialist Movement	21	6.77	2,856	7.34	2	0	2	New
Christian Historical Union	21	6.77	2,286	5.88	2	4	6	−1
Free-thinking Democratic League	14	4.52	1,677	4.31	1	2	3	−1
Liberal State Party	12	3.87	1,612	4.14	1	4	5	−1
CHU−ARP joint list	16	5.16	1,280	3.29	1	0	1	New
Communist Party of Holland	7	2.26	1,256	3.23	0	0	0	New
Reformed Political Party	6	1.94	434	1.12	0	0	0	0
Christian Democratic Union	3	0.97	240	0.62	0	0	0	New
Catholic Democratic Party	1	0.32	196	0.50	0	0	0	New
Total	310	100.00	38,897	100.00	25	25	50	0
Valid votes	310	100.00	38,897	100.00				
Invalid/blank votes	0	0.00	0	0.00				
Total votes	310	100.00	38,897	100.00				
Registered voters/turnout	319	97.18	40,079	97.05				
Source: Staatscourant

=== By electoral group ===
1935 Senate election in electoral group I
Party	Unweighted		Weighted		Seats	+/–
Party	Votes	%	Votes	%	Seats	+/–
Roman Catholic State Party	105	56.15	13,196	64.09	9	+1
Social Democratic Workers' Party	23	12.30	2,311	11.22	1	0
Anti-Revolutionary Party	17	9.09	1,445	7.02	1	0
Christian Historical Union	16	8.56	1,306	6.34	1	0
National Socialist Movement	13	6.95	1,404	6.82	1	New
Reformed Political Party	6	3.21	434	2.11	0	0
Liberal State Party	4	2.14	276	1.34	0	−1
Free-thinking Democratic League	3	1.60	217	1.05	0	−1
Total	187	100.00	20,589	100.00	13	0
Valid votes	187	100.00	20,589	100.00		
Invalid/blank votes	0	0.00	0	0.00		
Total votes	187	100.00	20,589	100.00		
Registered voters/turnout	192	97.40	20,987	98.10		
Source: Staatscourant

1935 Senate election in electoral group III
Party	Unweighted		Weighted		Seats	+/–
Party	Votes	%	Votes	%	Seats	+/–
Social Democratic Workers' Party	35	28.46	5,352	29.23	4	0
Roman Catholic State Party	21	17.07	3,188	17.41	2	−1
Anti-Revolutionary Party	8	6.50	1,568	8.56	1	0
Free-thinking Democratic League	11	8.94	1,460	7.97	1	0
National Socialist Movement	8	6.50	1,452	7.93	1	New
Liberal State Party	8	6.50	1,336	7.30	1	0
CHU−ARP joint list	16	13.01	1,280	6.99	1	New
Communist Party of Holland	7	5.69	1,256	6.86	0	New
Christian Historical Union	5	4.07	980	5.35	1	−1
Christian Democratic Union	3	2.44	240	1.31	0	New
Catholic Democratic Party	1	0.81	196	1.07	0	New
Total	123	100.00	18,308	100.00	12	0
Valid votes	123	100.00	18,308	100.00		
Invalid/blank votes	0	0.00	0	0.00		
Total votes	123	100.00	18,308	100.00		
Registered voters/turnout	127	96.85	19,092	95.89		
Source: Staatscourant
