= National Socialist Movement (Netherlands) =

Dutch Nazi movement and political party

National Socialist Movement in the Netherlands Nationaal-Socialistische Beweging in Nederland
- Leader: Anton Mussert
- Founder: Anton Mussert; Cornelis van Geelkerken
- Founded: 14 December 1931
- Banned: 6 May 1945
- Headquarters: Utrecht, Netherlands
- Newspaper: Volk en Vaderland
- Student wing: Nederlandsche Nationaal-Socialistische Studentenfederatie; Nationaal Socialistisch Studentenfront
- Youth wing: Nationale Jeugdstorm
- Paramilitary wing: Weerbaarheidsafdeling
- East Indies branch: Nationaal-Socialistische Beweging in Nederlands-Indië
- Membership (1944): 101,314
- Ideology: Nazism; Fascism; Dutch nationalism Dutch irredentism Collaborationism
- Political position: Far-right
- Colors: Red; Black

Party flag

The National Socialist Movement in the Netherlands (Dutch: Nationaal-Socialistische Beweging in Nederland, pronounced [nɑ(t)ɕoːˌnaːlsoːɕaːˈlɪstisə bəˈʋeːɣɪŋ ɪn ˈneːdərlɑnt]; NSB) was a Dutch fascist and later Nazi political organisation that eventually became a political party. As a parliamentary party participating in legislative elections, the NSB had some success during the 1930s. Under German occupation, it remained the only legal party in the Netherlands during most of the Second World War.

== History ==
=== Early years (1931–1936) ===
The NSB was founded in Utrecht in 1931 during a period when several nationalist, fascist and Nazi parties were founded. The founders were Anton Mussert, who became the party's leader, and Cornelis van Geelkerken. The party based its program on Italian fascism and German Nazism: however, unlike the latter, before 1936 the party was not antisemitic and even had Jewish members.

In 1933, after a year of building an organization, the party organized its first public meeting, a Landdag in Utrecht which was attended by 600 party militants. Here the party presented itself. After that, the party's support began to grow. In the same year, the government forbade civil servants to be members.

In the provincial elections of 1935, the party gained almost eight percent of the votes and two seats in the Senate. This was achieved against the background of the economic hardship of the Great Depression, which increased the party's stature until 1937. Mussert's image as a reliable politician and his pragmatism allowed him to unite the different types of fascism and contributed to the party's success. This was bolstered by the party's strong organization and its political strategy, which was not oriented towards revolution but a democratic and legal take over of the country. By 1936, the party was holding annual mass meetings near Lunteren in Gelderland and, in 1938, it built the Muur van Mussert there, a wall which was supposed to be one element in a set of buildings and monuments inspired by the Nazi party rally grounds in Nuremberg.

=== Nazi influence (1936–1940) ===
In 1936, under the influence of Meinoud Rost van Tonningen, the party became more radical and openly antisemitic. Rost van Tonningen began to question Mussert's leadership, with the support of the German Nazi Party, increasing divisions within the party. This radicalisation led to decreased support for the party and a strong anti-fascist reaction of the political parties, trade unions and churches. In the 1937 general elections, the party gained only four percent of the votes and four seats in the House of Representatives, although it increased its representation in the Senate to five seats. After 1937, the party's stature diminished and many members left.

In parliament, the NSB MPs showed little respect for parliamentary procedures and rules. Many NSB MPs were called to order by the chairman of parliament for physical and verbal violence.

In the provincial election of 1939, the party also gained four percent of the votes.

=== Second World War (1940–1945) ===
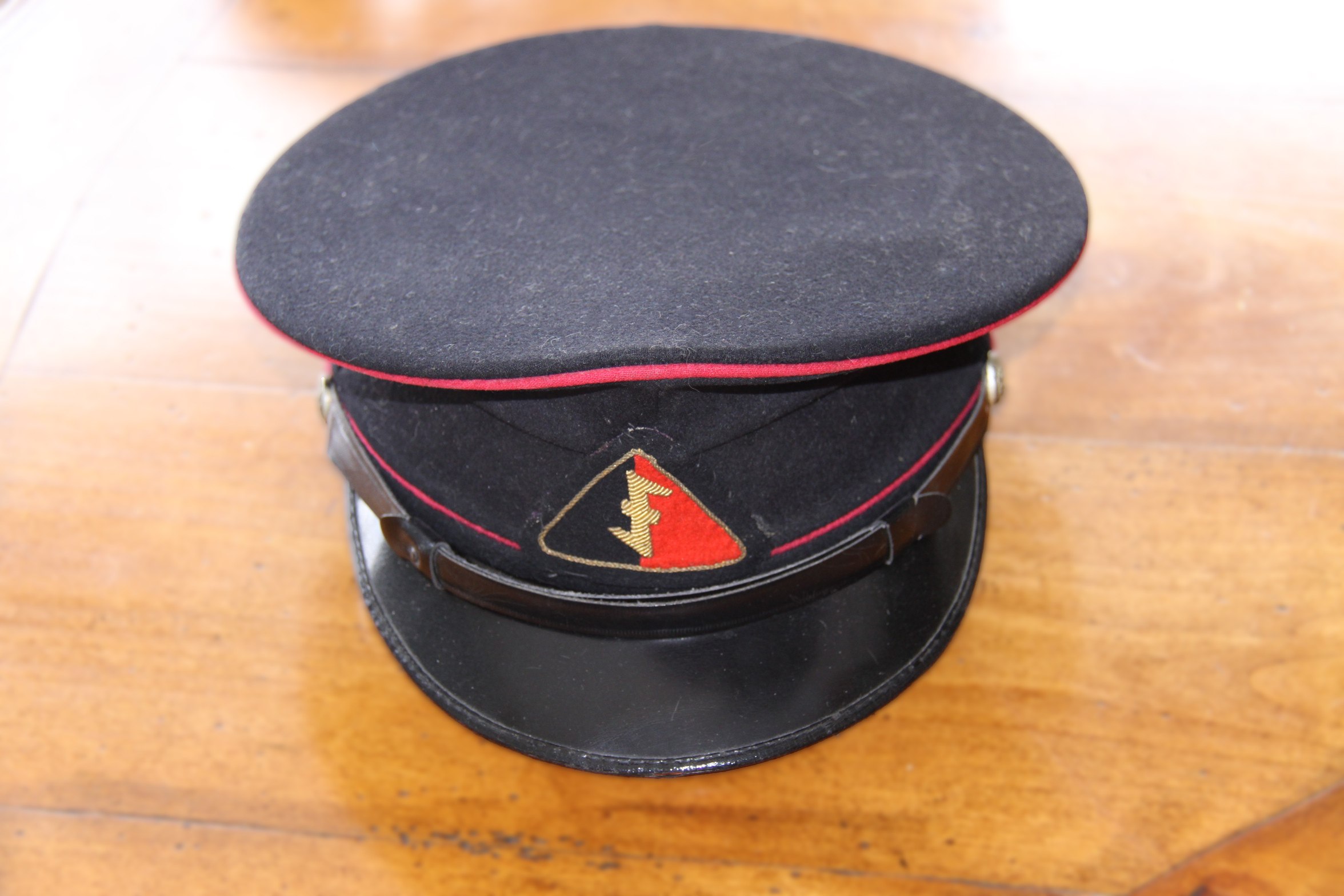
Dutch WWII NSB (Nationaal-Socialistische Beweging) cap

After the Second World War broke out, the NSB sympathized with the Germans and advocated strict neutrality for the Netherlands. In May 1940, 800 NSB members and sympathizers were put in custody by the Dutch government, after the German invasion. Supporters of the party in the Dutch East Indies were also interned at that time, and when a Japanese invasion of the colony began some of these were deported to Surinam and interned in the Jodensavanne internment camp. Soon after the Dutch defeat on 14 May 1940, the imprisoned European NSB members in the Netherlands were set free by German troops. In June 1940, Mussert delivered a speech in Lunteren in which he called for the Netherlands to embrace the Germans and renounce the Dutch Monarchy, which had fled to London.

In 1940 the German occupation government had outlawed all socialist and communist parties; in 1941 it forbade all parties, except for the NSB. The NSB openly collaborated with the occupation forces. Its membership grew to about 100,000. The NSB played an important role in lower government and civil service; every new mayor appointed by the German occupation government was a member of the NSB. On the national level, Mussert had expected he would be made leader of an independent Dutch state allied to Germany; in reality, however, the Austrian Nazi Arthur Seyss-Inquart was in charge of an occupation government. He chose to work with the remaining establishment as he realised that the NSB lacked popular support and talented candidates for more important functions.

Mussert had in total five meetings with Adolf Hitler in which he pleaded for an independent Netherlands, but he was unsuccessful. Although Seyss-Inquart had proposed that Mussert should be made Prime Minister of the Netherlands, he was only given the honorary title 'Leader of the Dutch People', and he was allowed to build a marginal State Secretariat, but he was given little or no actual power. His influence in the party waned as Rost van Tonningen and other more pro-German members gained influence. Unlike Mussert, Rost van Tonningen was in favour of incorporation of the Netherlands into a Greater Germanic Reich. Beginning in the summer of 1943, many male members of the NSB were organized in the Landwacht, which helped the government control the population.

On 4 September 1944, the Allied forces conquered Antwerp and the NSB expected the fall of the Netherlands to come soon. On 5 September, most of the NSB's leadership and many members fled to Germany and the party's organization fell apart, on what is known as Dolle Dinsdag (Mad Tuesday). Mussert himself spent the winter of 1944–45 at the estate of Bellinckhof, near Almelo. In these final months of the war the movement fractured further and further, and Mussert ordered measures against leaders who behaved 'dishonorably' in September 1944. In the beginning of 1945 he terminated the memberships of Rost van Tonningen and Van Geelkerken. However, at that time Mussert's power was severely weakened by the war events and the fracturing of the NSB.

=== Dissolution (1945) ===
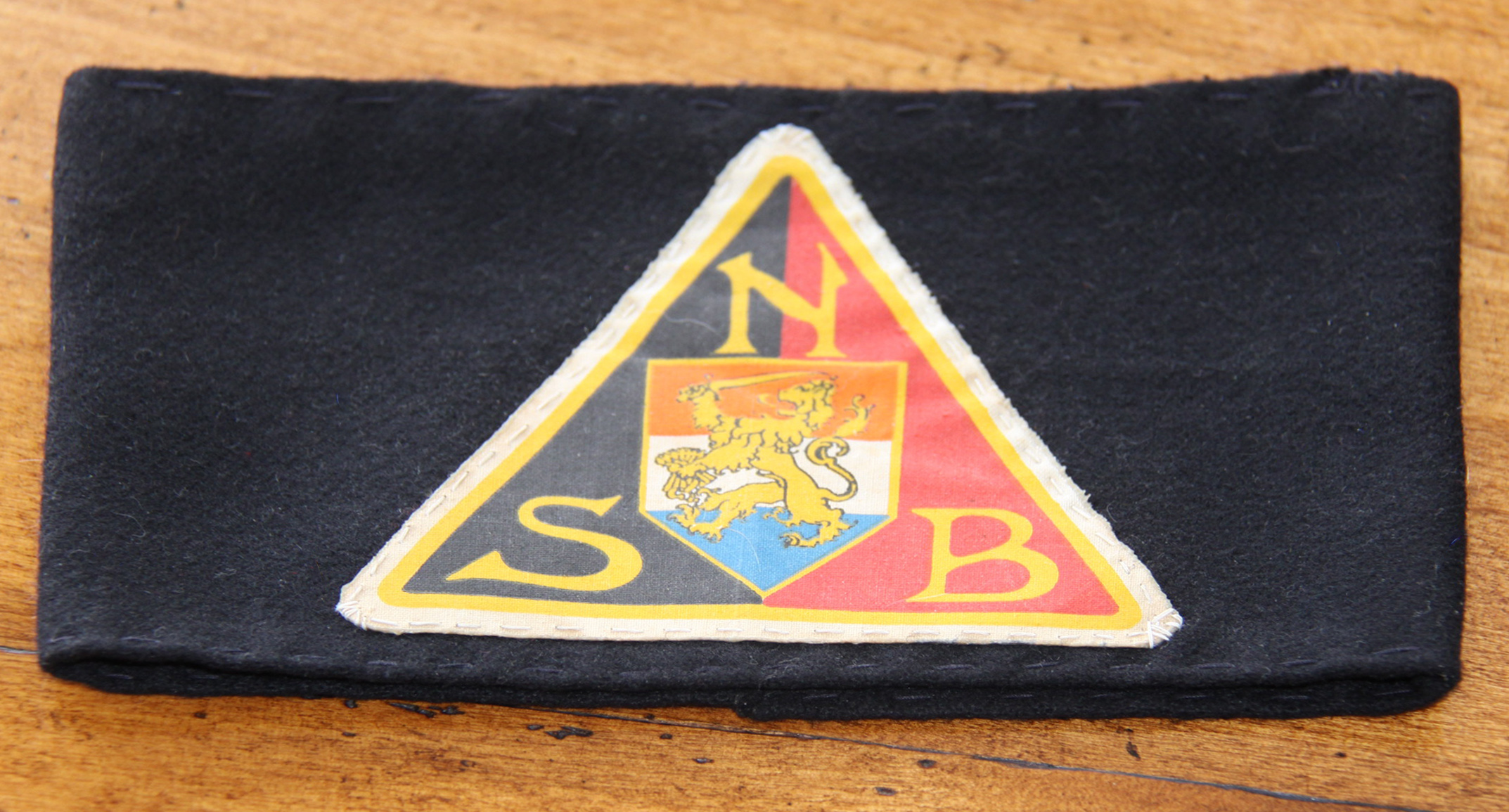
WWII Dutch NSB (Nationaal-Socialistische Beweging) armband

After the German surrender on 6 May 1945, the NSB was outlawed. Mussert was arrested the following day. Many of the members of the NSB were arrested, but only a few were convicted.

There were no attempts to continue the organization illegally. Former members were shunned and sometimes imprisoned. After that, they and their children remained stigmatized for a long time in society. The senior party leadership was arrested and faced charges: Mussert was executed on 7 May 1946, Van Geelkerken was imprisoned, and Rost van Tonningen committed suicide while awaiting trial.

== Ideology and issues ==
The NSB started out as a classical fascist party, which based itself on the principles of leadership. It wanted a fascist state with a compliant government, fascist order and state control. It put the national interest above the individual interest and the interest of social groups (pillars) that had characterized Dutch society. The party was anti-parliamentary and authoritarian. Its program, which was otherwise modeled on the program of the German Nazi Party, initially did not contain the antisemitic and racist ideology of the Nazi Party. After 1936, under the influence of Meinoud Rost van Tonningen, the party became more oriented towards the Nazi Party and took on its antisemitic and racist ideas. It also began to sympathize with the aggressive foreign policy of Italy and Germany.

Practical demands of the NSB were: abolition of individual voting rights, corporatism, a duty to work and serve in the army, limits on the freedom of the press, laws against strikes. It demanded a unification of the Netherlands with Flanders and French Flanders in a Greater Netherlands, which would also control a large colonial empire consisting of Belgian Congo, the Dutch East Indies and perhaps South Africa. This state would not be a part of Germany, but only an independent loyal ally to Germany.

The NSB was against the current political structure of the Netherlands and parliamentary democracy itself.

== Organization ==
=== Structure ===
The party was organized with Mussert serving as party chair and political leader. From September 1940 until its dissolution, Carolus Josephus Huygen served as Secretary General of the party. Yearly the party organized a Landdag, where Mussert gave a political speech.

=== Rituals and symbols ===
The NSB copied elements of the Italian Fascists and German Nazis. Like Mussolini's Fascists, the NSB uniforms included black shirts, and the Party adopted the Fascist salute. Since 1933 it used the salute "Hou Zee!", which, Anton Mussert said, connoted courage and referred to the "glorious" maritime history of the Dutch Republic. It also began using titles like Leider for Mussert (Leader; similar to Duce or Führer), Kameraad for men (comrade) and Kameraadske ('comradess', a neologism) for women. One party slogan was "Mussert or Moscow", evoking the Fascist defense against supposed Communist subversion. Although the Party later adopted the Nazi red and black colors and the swastika symbol, the original NSB flag used the Prince's Flag. A blue wolfsangel (a hooked symbol of a wolf trap) on a white disc was set against an orange field.

The NSB originally used the Prince's Flag

NSB wolfsangel flag

Wolfsangel symbol of the Wappen NSB

=== Party membership ===
Ontwikkeling ledental NSB
1 January 1933	900
1 January 1934	21,000
1 January 1935	33,000
1 January 1936	52,000
1 January 1937	48,000
1 January 1938	39,000
1 January 1939	37,000
1 January 1940	32.000
March 1940	33,342
31 October 1941	90,788
31 March 1943	99,353
30 September 1943	101,314

Historians Lou de Jong and A.A. de Jonge have characterized NSB members as socially isolated opportunists who were motivated to join the NSB through a mix of opportunism, idealism and social connections.

=== Support and electorate ===
The NSB drew its main support from the middle class: civil servants, farmers, business people and soldiers supported the party. Most of these people were not part of the strong pillarized organisations surrounding the socialist unions, and the Protestant and Catholic churches. Instead they were often a loose member of the weaker liberal pillar, which was very diverse. The NSB party scored particularly well in Drenthe, Gelderland and the towns of Limburg at the border with Germany. The synod of the Reformed Churches in the Netherlands declared membership of the NSB irreconcilable with membership in their church denomination in 1936 and reaffirmed this in 1941. The Catholic Church warned against the party's ideology in 1936 and banned support for the NSB in 1936 on pain of exclusion from the sacraments. A mandement from the Roman Catholic bishops declared in 1941 membership of the NSB illicit to a high degree.

=== Associated organisations ===
The NSB was surrounded by several party organizations. It published a weekly newspaper, Volk en Vaderland ("People and Fatherland"). Between 1931 and 1935 the party had its own paramilitary organization, the black uniformed Weerbaarheidsafdeling (WA), similar to the Sturmabteilung of the Nazi Party. It was refounded in 1940. It also founded its own youth organization, Nationale Jeugdstorm (Youthstorm); a farmers' organization; and a daily newspaper, Het Nationale Dagblad (The National Daily).

In 1940 the NSB formed the Nederlandsche SS (Dutch SS), which had up to 7,000 members.

The party also had a branch in the East Indies, which enjoyed some modest popularity among the mixed Dutch-Indonesian Indo population, but began to rapidly decline after the NSB started to adopt more racialist and blut und boden views, and was banned on 10 May 1940, in reaction to the European NSB entering into collaboration.

The term "NSB'er" has become synonymous with traitor in the Netherlands, and is used as an insult, especially in the context of ratting somebody out to authorities.

A grim joke after World War II, made by Dutch Resistance fighters, is that former NSB members insisted that their acronym actually stood for "Niet So [zo] Bedoeld" or "I didn't mean it like that" as they attempted to downplay their treachery.

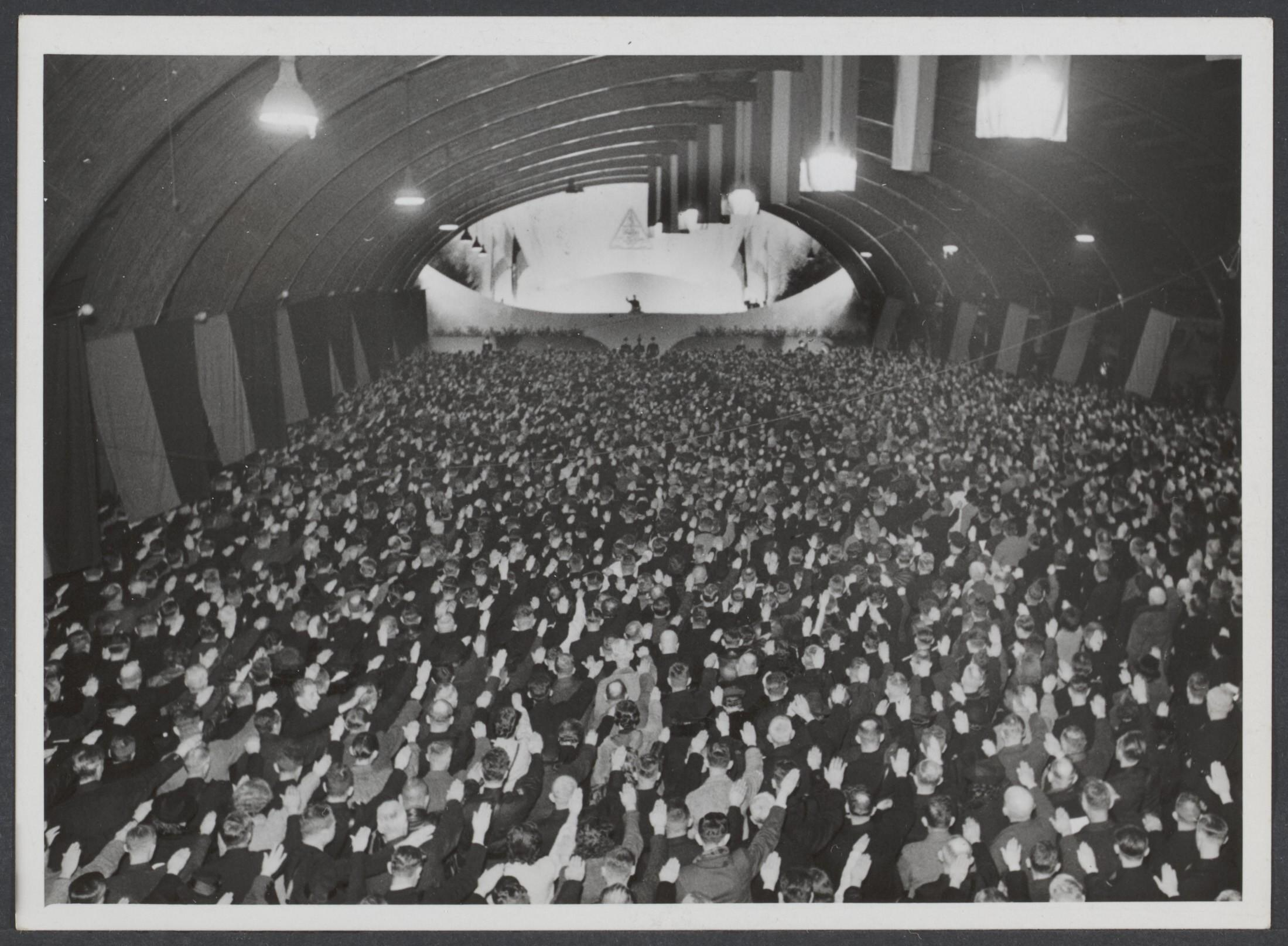
NSB Meeting (Utrecht 1941)

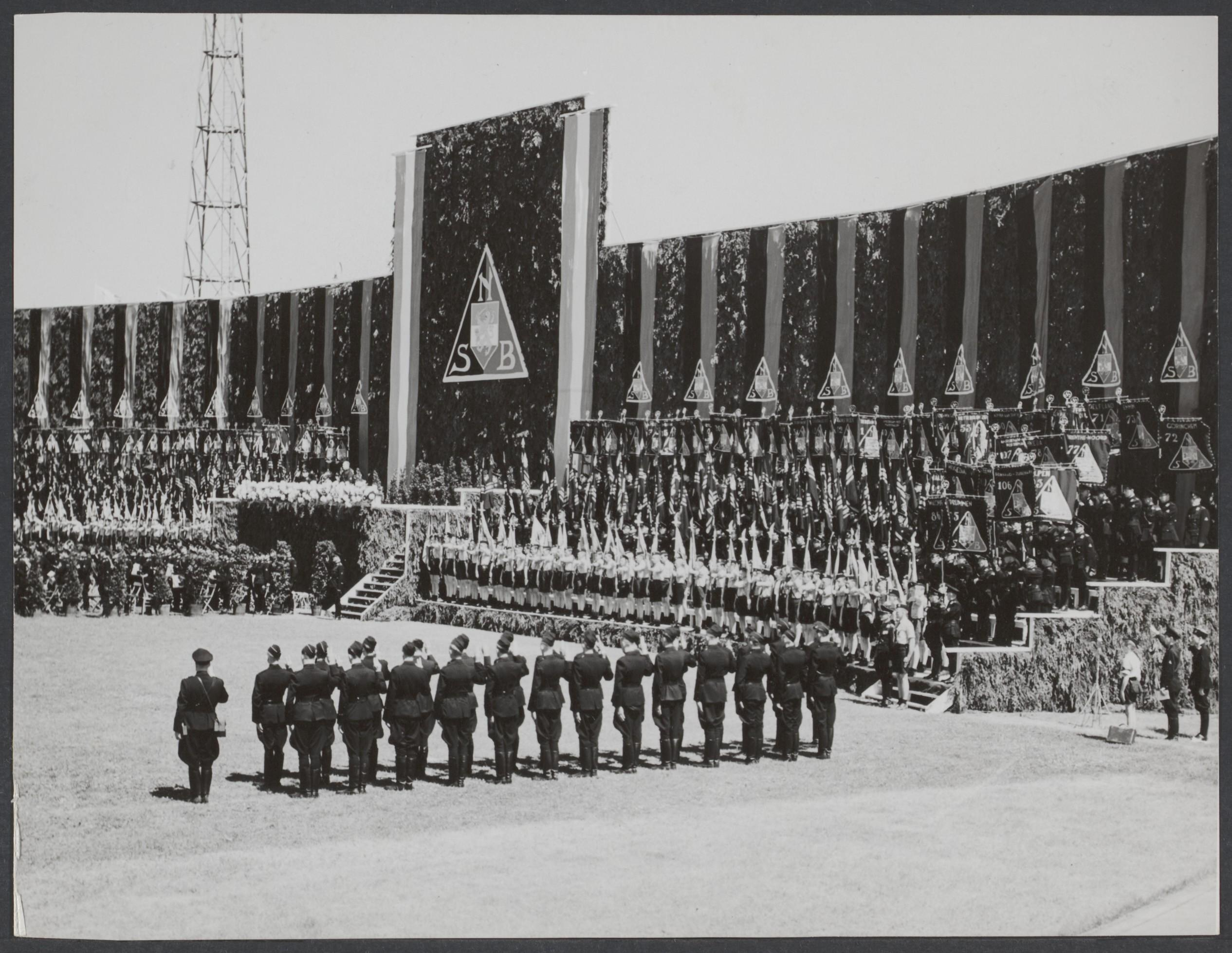
NSB Meeting
(The Hague 1941)

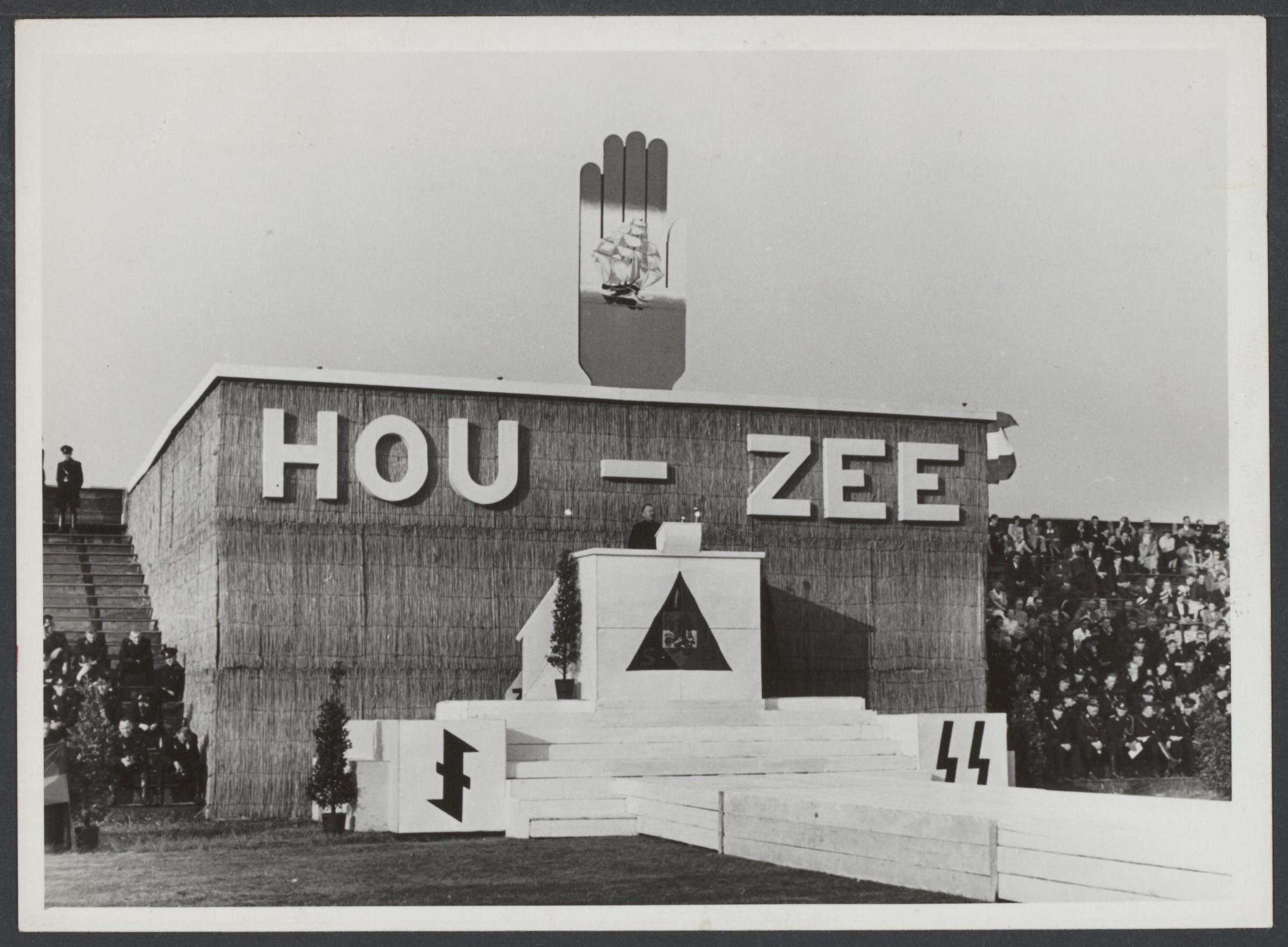
HouZee
(The Hague 1941)

=== Relationships with other parties ===
The NSB was methodically isolated by other parties. Before the war the socialist Social Democratic Workers' Party and Nederlands Verbond van Vakverenigingen (Dutch Association of Trade Unions) coordinated counter-demonstrations and propaganda with a separate organization 'Freedom, Labour and Bread'. The NSB lobbied with the German occupiers to have other political organisations outlawed. Although the Germans had no problem with banning the socialists, communists and Christian-democrats, it was considerably harder for the NSB to convince them to get rid of their fascist rivals. Eventually, the Germans forbade these too and urged members to join the NSB, as these parties were considered too small. The most important rival for the NSB was the Nederlandsche Unie, an organisation founded in 1940, which wanted to rebuild Dutch society within the cadre of the changed balance of power. Although their point of view was later considered collaborationist, many Dutch joined the movement as an alternative to the NSB, which it soon outgrew. The end for the Nederlandsche Unie came when they refused to support the German invasion of the Soviet-Union. Hence, as of 1941 to 1945, the NSB was the only permitted political party in the Netherlands.

== Electoral performance ==
=== House of Representatives ===
Election	Lead candidate	List	Votes		Seats
Election	Lead candidate	List	#	%	Seats
1937	Anton Mussert	List	171,137	4.2	4 / 100

=== Senate ===
Election	Lead candidate	List	Votes		Seats
Election	Lead candidate	List	#	%	Seats
1935	Max de Marchant et d'Ansembourg	List			2 / 50
1937	Van Vessem	List			4 / 50

=== Municipal and provincial councils ===
Before 1940 the NSB held seats in provincial and municipal legislatures, but did not cooperate in any governments. After 1940 these legislatures stopped functioning and the NSB's role in local and provincial legislatures expanded. All newly appointed mayors were members of the NSB.

NSB seats in provincial councils.
Province	1935	1939
Drenthe	4 / 35	3 / 35
Friesland	1 / 50	0 / 50
Gelderland	5 / 62	2 / 62
Groningen	4 / 45	2 / 45
Limburg	5 / 45	2 / 45
North Brabant	2 / 64	1 / 64
North Holland	7 / 77	4 / 77
Overijssel	3 / 47	2 / 47
Utrecht	4 / 41	1 / 41
Zeeland	2 / 42	1 / 42
South Holland	7 / 82	3 / 82

== See also ==
- Germanic-SS – the collective name given to Allgemeine-SS groups that were raised in Occupied Europe between 1939 and 1945.
