= Cornelis Jacobus Snijders =

Dutch military officer (1852–1939)

General Cornelis Jacobus Snijders
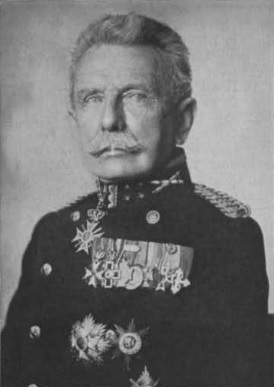

Commander-in-chief of the Armed forces
- In office 31 July 1914 – 9 November 1918
- Preceded by: Position established
- Succeeded by: Lieutenant general Willem Frederik Pop

Personal details
- Born: September 29, 1852 Nieuwe-Tonge, Netherlands
- Died: May 26, 1939 (aged 86) Hilversum, Netherlands

Military service
- Allegiance: Netherlands
- Branch/service: Royal Netherlands Army
- Rank: General

Cornelis Jacobus Snijders (29 September 1852 - 26 May 1939) was a Dutch military leader. He was Commander-in-Chief of the Armed Forces of the Netherlands during World War I.

== Career ==
In 1869 Snijders joined the Royal Military Academy in Breda, becoming an engineer. In 1873 he went to the Dutch East Indies, and fought in the Aceh War.

In October 1875 Snijders was back in the Netherlands. He was again placed with the Engineers. Here, he had an important role in the design and construction of the armored fortresses of IJmuiden, Hoek van Holland, and Fort Harssens. From 1882 to 1886 he was in Magdeburg to oversee construction of the armored cupolas. Snijders also attended related trials in Italy and Romania.

On 1 July 1910, Snijders was made chief of the general staff. He was a proponent of military aviation. In 1913, Snijders created the Aviation Department. Later the navy received an airforce as well. Snijders was also First Chairman of the Dutch Association for Aviation.

When tensions grew in anticipation of World War I, Snijders was made Commander-in-Chief of the Armed Forces. Shortly afterward, he was promoted to full general.

In April 1918, one month after the signing of the Treaty of Brest-Litovsk, which freed Germany on its Eastern Front, he opposed war with Germany, making clear that if war was to be fought, he preferred to fight alongside Germany. After the war, Snijders became a politician for the proto-fascist Alliance for National Reconstruction.

=== Personal life ===
Snijders was born in Nieuwe-Tonge on 29 September 1852. In 1865, he went to the Hogere Burgerschool in Middelburg but did not finish it. In 1883, Snijders married Johanna Adriana Everdina. Snijders died in Hilversum on 26 May 1939.

== Military decorations ==
- Knight fourth class of the Military Order of William (1875)
- Knight Grand Cross of the Order of the Netherlands Lion (Knight 1894, Knight Grand Cross 1919)
- Grand Officer of the Order of Orange-Nassau (1914)
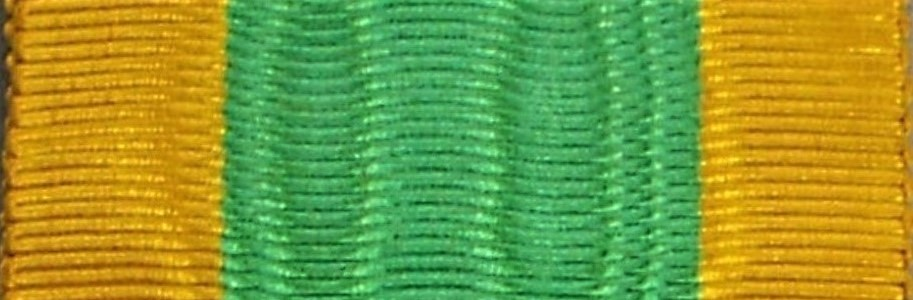
- Expedition Cross (1877)
- Officers' Cross (XLV) (1887)
- Cross of Merit of the Netherlands Red Cross
- Atjeh Medal
- Mobilisation Cross 1914-1918 (1925)
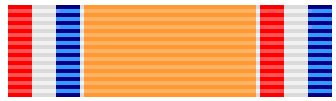
- Cross of Merit for the national committee "Mobilisation Cross 1914-1918"
- Knight Grand Cross of the Order of the Crown
- Knight first class of the Order of the Gold Lion of the House of Nassau (1919)
- Commander of the Order of St. Olav
- Knight first class of the Order of the Red Eagle
- Commander of the Order of the Sword
- Officer of the Order of the Crown

== See also ==
- Henk Walaardt Sacré
- Izaak Reijnders
- Bonifacius Cornelis de Jonge
