= Staatscourant =

Government gazette of the Netherlands

The Staatscourant or Government Gazette is the newspaper published by the Dutch state containing new laws and various governmental announcements, such as bankruptcies or prenuptial agreements.

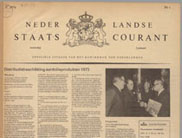
Staatscourant edition from 1974

== History ==
The Staatscourant (Government Gazette) was first published in 1814 under William I of the Netherlands.

Since July 1, 2009, the paper is no longer printed, as the number of paid subscriptions had dropped to around 5,000, stimulated by a European guideline on digitized government and enabled by the 'Wet elektronische bekendmaking' it is now published online at "officielebekendmakingen.nl" (official announcements) but retains its former name.

== See also ==
- Public journal
