= Anton Mussert =

Dutch Nazi Politician and collaborator (1894–1946)

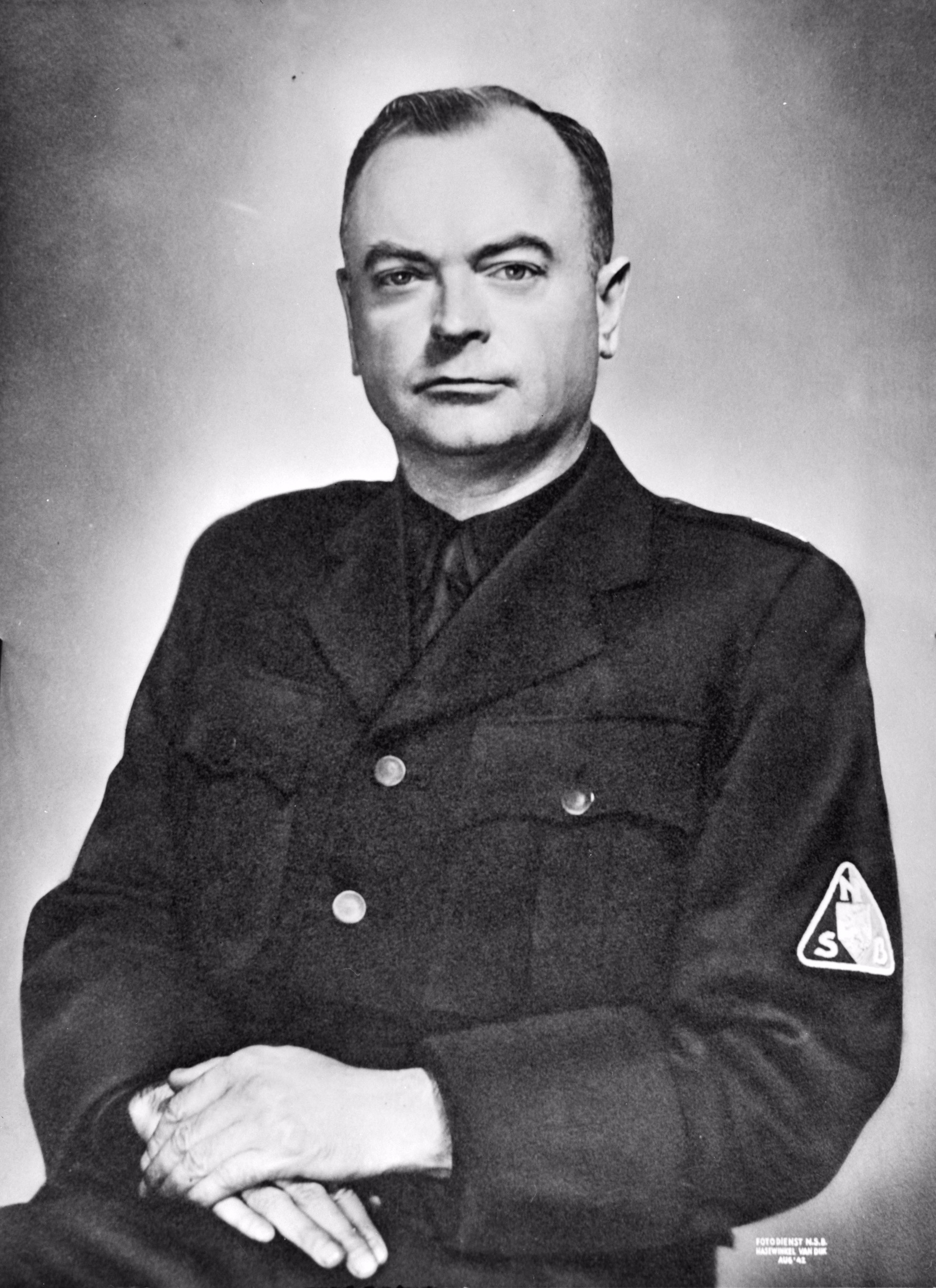

Leader of the Dutch People
- In office 13 December 1942 – 7 May 1945 Serving with Arthur Seyss-Inquart (Note: As Reich Commissioner for the Occupied Dutch Territories.)
- Preceded by: Office created
- Succeeded by: Office abolished

Leader of the National Socialist Movement
- In office 14 December 1931 – 6 May 1945
- Preceded by: Office created
- Succeeded by: Office abolished

Personal details
- Born: Anton Adriaan Mussert; 11 May 1894 Werkendam, Netherlands
- Died: 7 May 1946 (aged 51) Waalsdorpervlakte, The Hague, Netherlands
- Cause of death: Execution by firing squad
- Party: National Socialist Movement (from 1931)
- Other political affiliations: Liberal State Party (1920s)
- Spouse: Maria Witlam
- Parents: Joannes Leonardus Mussert (father); Frederika Witlam (mother, sister in law)
- Education: Delft University of Technology (MEng)
- Occupation: Politician; civil engineer

Anton Adriaan Mussert (Dutch pronunciation: [ˈɑntɔ ˈmʏsərt]; (Note: First name in isolation: [ˈɑntɔn].) 11 May 1894 – 7 May 1946) was a Dutch politician who co-founded the National Socialist Movement in the Netherlands (NSB) in 1931 and served as its leader until the party was banned in 1945. As such, he was the most prominent Dutch leader of the movement before and during World War II. Mussert collaborated with the German occupation government, but was granted little actual power and held the nominal title of Leider van het Nederlandsche Volk ("Leader of the Dutch People") from 1942 onwards. In May 1945, as the war came to an end in Europe, Mussert was captured and arrested by Allied forces. He was charged and convicted of treason, and was executed in 1946.

== Early life ==
Mussert was born on 11 May 1894 in Werkendam, in the northern part of the province of North Brabant in the Netherlands. From an early age he showed talent in technical matters and after graduating from school he chose to study civil engineering at the Delft University of Technology. He married his aunt Maria Witlam, his mother's sister, in 1917 despite opposition from his mother. In the 1920s, he became active in several far right organisations, such as the Dietsche Bond which advocated a Greater Netherlands including Flanders (Dutch-speaking Belgium).

== Foundation of the Nationaal-Socialistische Beweging ==
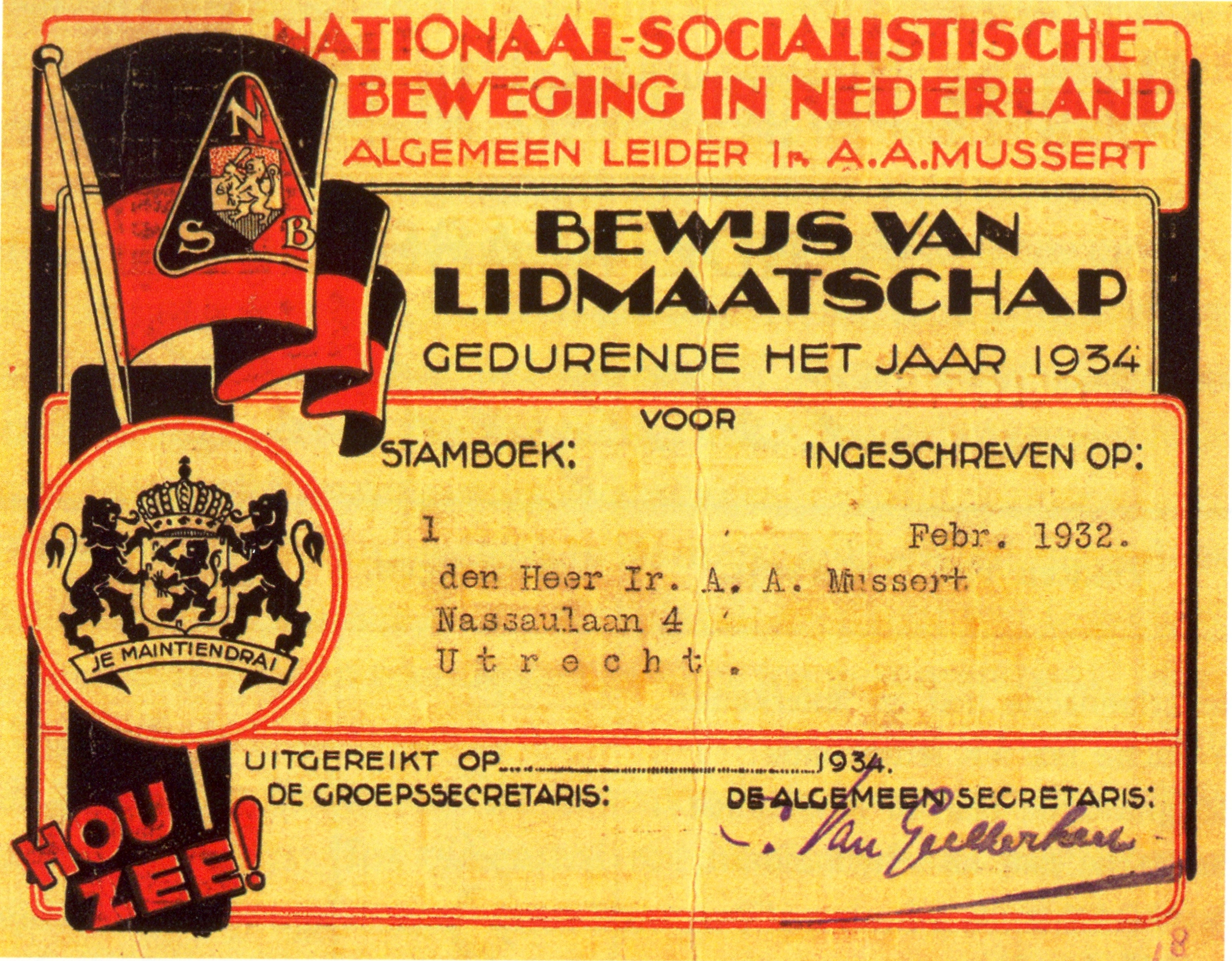
Mussert's membership card in the NSB

On 14 December 1931, Mussert, Cornelis van Geelkerken, and ten others founded the National Socialist Movement in the Netherlands (Dutch: Nationaal-Socialistische Beweging in Nederland), a Dutch counterpart to the National Socialist German Workers' Party. In its early years, the NSB boasted that its membership included several hundred Jews, until the German party directed a more anti-Semitic course.

A 1933 demonstration in Utrecht attracted only 600 supporters. A year later, the NSB rallied 25,000 demonstrators in Amsterdam. The NSB received 300,000 votes in the 1935 parliamentary elections, almost 8% of the national vote

== Role during the war ==
=== 1940 ===
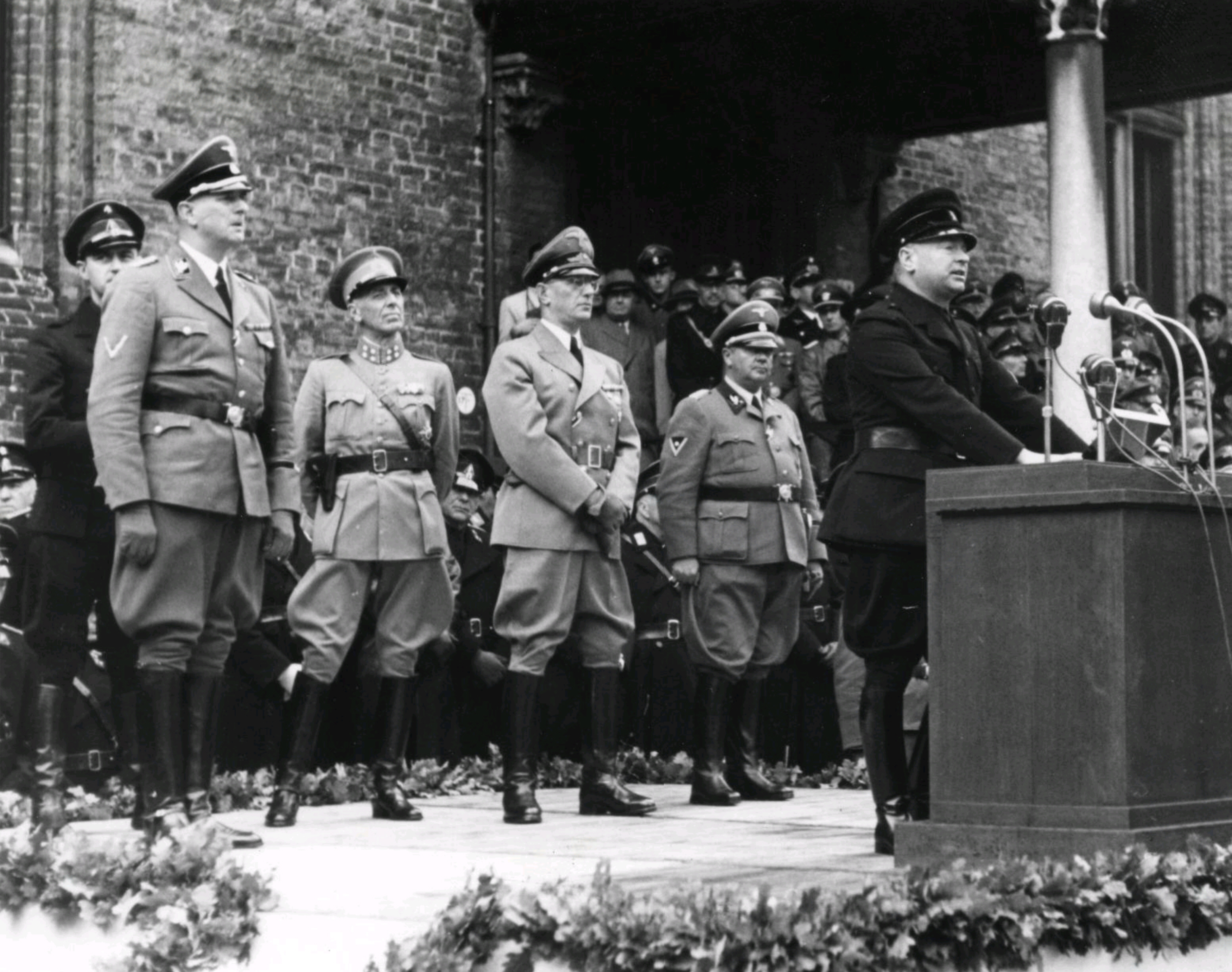
Mussert giving a speech to NSB volunteers in The Hague, October 1941. To the rear (L to R) are SS Obergruppenführer Hanns Albin Rauter, Dutch general Hendrik Seyffardt, Rijkscommissaris Arthur Seyss-Inquart, and SD Gruppenführer Wilhelm Harster.

A state of siege was declared by the Dutch government in April 1940 after the foreign correspondent for The New York Times, Vladimir Poliakov, reported that Mussert's followers were preparing to kidnap Queen Wilhelmina as part of a coup.

On 10 May, German troops invaded the Netherlands and Mussert was permitted to suppress all political parties other than the NSB.

Mussert was not appointed prime minister of the occupied nation. Instead, Austrian Nazi Arthur Seyss-Inquart was appointed as the Reichskommissar, while Berlin summoned Mussert to control his uncooperative countrymen. Mussert responded by working with the Gestapo in stopping resistance to the German occupation. On 21 June 1940 Mussert agreed to have NSB members train with the SS-Standarte 'Westland'. On 11 September, Mussert instructed Henk Feldmeijer to organise the Nederlandsche SS (Dutch SS) as a division of the NSB. Mussert had nothing to do with the raising of an all-Dutch volunteer SS unit, the SS-Freiwilligen-Legion Niederlande. Regardless, thousands of Dutch citizens were arrested.

=== 1941–1945 ===
In February 1941, Mussert agreed to and oversaw the formation of the 23rd SS Volunteer Panzer Grenadier Division Nederland, which trained in Hamburg. In November 1941, the formation was ordered to the Eastern Front near Leningrad, under the overall command of Army Group North. The division acquitted itself well alongside its German allies, but suffered large losses.

On 8 December 1941, the independent Dutch administration in the Dutch East Indies declared war on Japan, the ally of Nazi Germany. After the Japanese invasion and occupation and the subsequent internment of 100,000 Dutch civilians and 50,000 military personnel, Mussert requested a meeting with Hitler. On 13 December 1942, Hitler declared Mussert to be "Leider van het Nederlandse Volk" (Leader of the Dutch People).

Having lost control of the Dutch SS and the military units that were serving in the Wehrmacht to his Nazi masters, Mussert had his last meeting with Hitler in May 1943, where he was told that he would never have political control. Following the unsuccessful Operation Market Garden in September 1944, which included a supporting strike by Dutch railway workers, the German authorities forbade food transport by rail, resulting in the Hongerwinter of 1944/45 during which 18,000 died. Throughout the crisis, Mussert stayed silent for fear of losing what power he had left. By the end of the war, 205,901 Dutch men and women had died. The Netherlands had the highest per capita death rate of all German-occupied countries in Western Europe, 2.36%. Another 30,000 died in the Dutch East Indies, either while fighting the Japanese or in camps as Japanese POWs. Dutch civilians were held in those camps as well.

== Execution ==
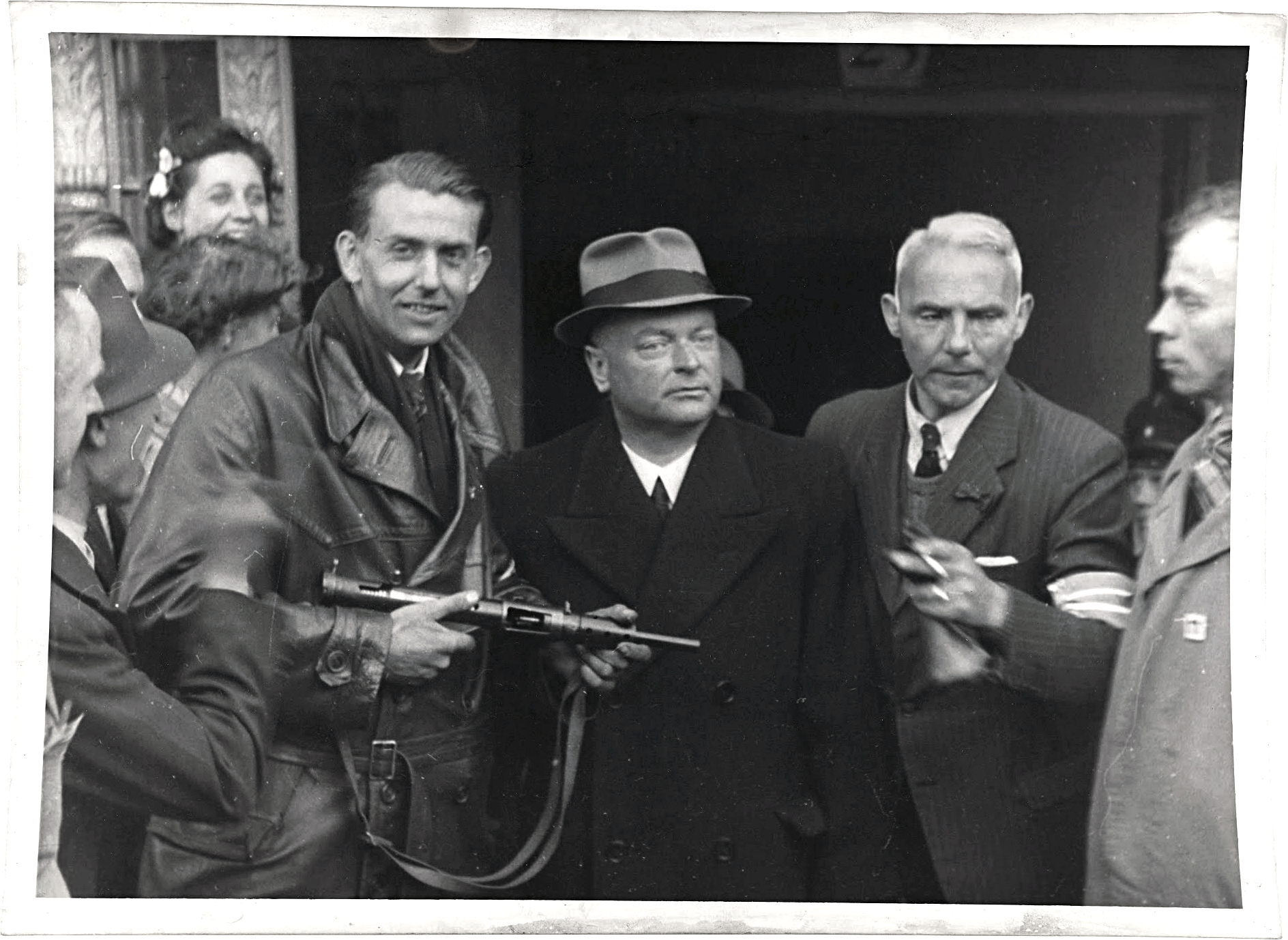
Anton Mussert being detained and led outside his office in The Hague, 7 May 1945

Upon the surrender of Germany, Mussert was arrested at the NSB office in The Hague on 7 May 1945. He was convicted of high treason on 28 November after a two-day trial, and was sentenced to death on 12 December. He appealed to Queen Wilhelmina for clemency. She refused. On 7 May 1946, exactly one year after his arrest and four days before his 52nd birthday, Mussert was executed by a firing squad on the Waalsdorpervlakte, a site near The Hague, where hundreds of Dutch citizens had been killed by the Nazi regime.

== See also ==
- History of the Netherlands (1939–1945)
- Villa Bouchina
