= Fascism in the Netherlands =

Fascism, including National Socialism, has been present in movements and political parties in the Netherlands since 1923, as part of fascism in Europe.

The first fascist political party, the Union of Actualists (Dutch: Verbond van Actualisten, VvA), was founded in 1923. Over sixty other fascist political parties were founded between 1923 and 1940, mostly as a result of infighting in and between the parties. The National Socialist Movement in the Netherlands (Dutch: Nationaal Socialistische Beweging, NSB) led by Anton Mussert became the most important around 1933. The general ideology of the fascists parties had been based on Italian fascism, but after 1935 the NSB and other fascists parties radicalised to national socialism. In 1941, all political parties were banned by the Nazi German occupation, except for the NSB.

After the Second World War, the NSB was outlawed. Small neo-fascist parties have been founded since, such as the Dutch People's Union (Dutch: Nederlandse Volks-Unie, NVU) and the Centre Party '86, but without national electoral success.

== History ==
=== Pre-World Wars ===
==== Before 1923 ====
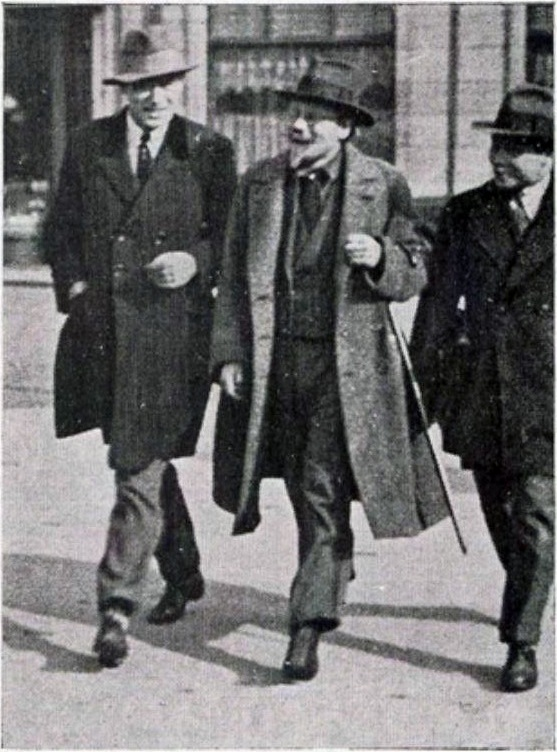
Ernst Michel, Erich Wichmann and Hugo Sinclair de Rochemont.

Hegelian philosopher Gerard Bolland (1854–1922) is seen as inspiration for fascists in the Netherlands. His followers included Emile Verviers, Erich Wichmann and Hugo Sinclair de Rochemont. In his 1921 academic speech "The signs of the times" (Dutch: De teekenen des tijds), he complained about democracy, communism and the International Jewry. In his speech he referred to the Rapaille Partij, founded by artist and future fascist Wichmann. This party was founded in response to the introduction of universal manhood suffrage and compulsory voting after the Pacification of 1917. By putting forward – and getting elected – candidates such as vagabond Nelis de Gelder, it sought to ridicule democracy. The party itself was not fascist, but served as inspiration for future fascists parties.

=== Interbellum ===
==== 1923–1928 ====
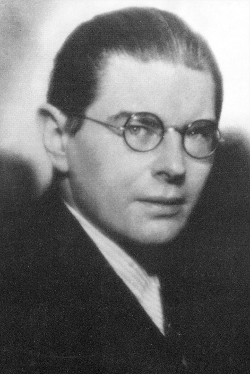
Alfred Haighton (1896–1943), financier of Union of Actualists and founder of Association ‘The Broom’.

In January 1923, inspired by Benito Mussolini's March on Rome, the first fascist party was founded in the Netherlands: the Union of Actualists (Dutch: Verbond van Actualisten, VvA). The party was founded by, amongst others, Sinclair and Alfred Haighton. Other parties emerged in the 1920s, whose ideology was somewhere between right-wing authoritarianism and fascism: the National Union (Dutch: Nationale Unie, NU), the Fatherland League (Dutch: Vaderlandsch Verbond, VV) and Wichmans Groep Rebelsche Patriotten. NU's membership included future prominent fascists such as former ARP parliamentary leader Coenraad van der Voort van Zijp, Carel Gerritson, Rob Groeninx van Zoelen, Wouter Lutkie and Anton Mussert. VV and VvA participated in the 1925 general election, but received only 0.4% and 0.07% of the votes respectively. Both VV and VvA declined due to internal struggles and faded out in the next years.

In its place, fascists parties such as the National People's Party (Dutch: Nationale Volkspartij), the Dutch Orange Nationalists (Dutch: Nederlandsche Oranje Nationalisten) and the First Dutch Fascist Organization (Dutch: Eerste Nederlandsche Fascisten Organisatie) were founded, with little success.

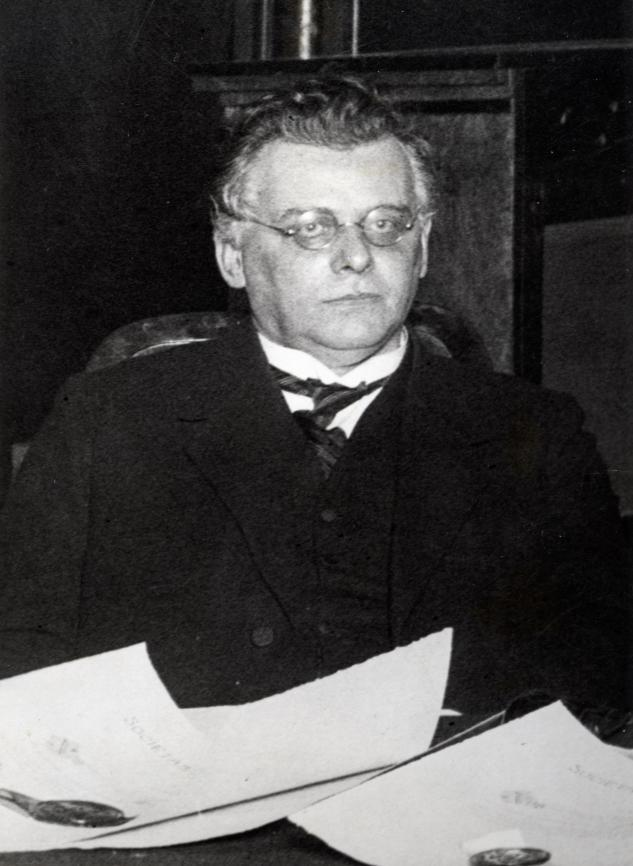
Carel Gerritson (1884–1958), founder of the National Union.

==== 1929–1933: Blooming phase ====
The Union of Nationalists (Dutch: Verbond van Nationalisten) was founded in 1928, drawing its early members from the Austerity Party (Dutch: Bezuinigingspartij) and a group of former VvA members led by C.J.M. van Eijsden. It participated in the 1929 general election with a conservative-liberal manifesto, but failed to get a seat. After the election, the party radicalised to fascism and became the most important fascist party around 1930. Its ideologist became Henri Peter Blok in 1930, but he and his supporters left the party after a quarrel in 1931. The party failed again to get a seat in the 1933 general election and was dissolved in 1934.

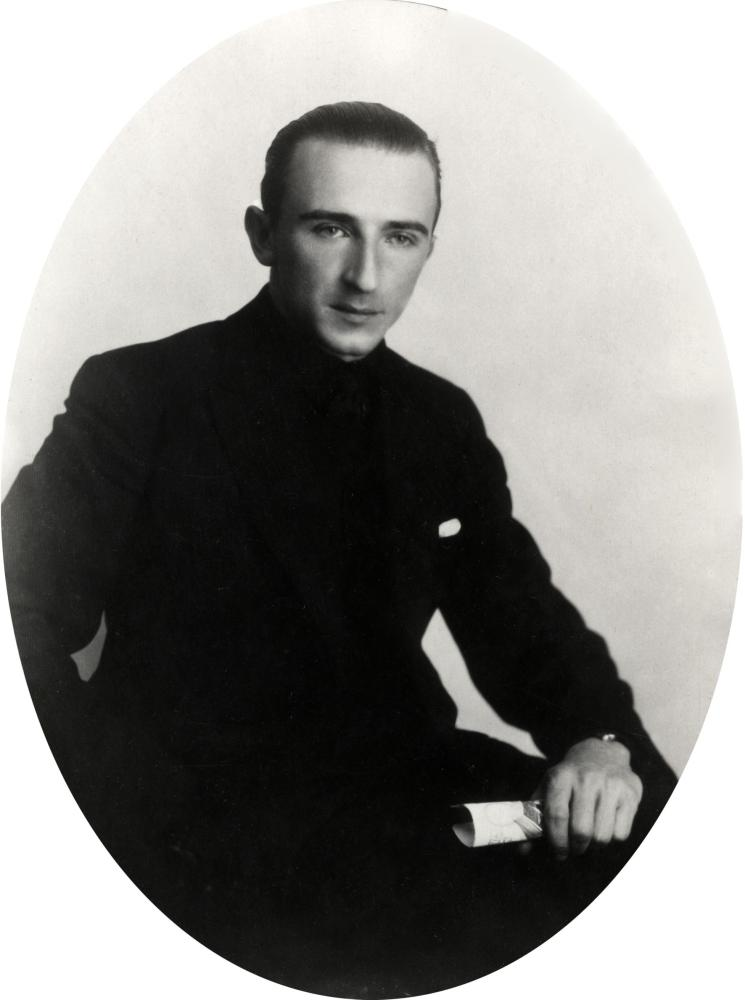
Jan Baars (1903–1989), leader of the Association ‘The Broom’ and founder of the General Dutch Fascist Union.

Its prominence was taken over by The Broom (Dutch: Vereeniging 'De Bezem'), founded in 1928 by Sinclaire and Haighton. Jan Baars, who was able to rally the working class, rose to prominence. He got into conflict with Sinclaire and Haighton, who both left the association. Subsequently, Baars renamed it into the General Dutch Fascist Union (Dutch: Algemeene Nederlandsche Fascisten Bond, ANFB). In September 1933, the party had around 3,000 members, but received only 17,157 votes in the 1933 general election, not enough for a seat.

Another fascist participant in the election was the Alliance for National Reconstruction (Dutch: Verbond voor Nationaal Herstel, VNH), founded in 1933 by Horace van Gybland Oosterhoff. VNH had been in talks with NU and ANFB to form a single list, but negotiations collapsed over Baars' candidacy. The party managed to win a seat, which was taken by William Westerman, making him the first fascist MP in the Netherlands.

Other fascist parties were unsuccessful, including the Nationaal Verbond Plicht, Orde, Recht, Dutch Fascist Union (Dutch: Nederlandsche Fascisten Unie) and Orange Fascists (Dutch: Oranjefascisten). The NU had considered participating, but instead supported ARP lead candidate Hendrikus Colijn, who they considered to be authoritarian.

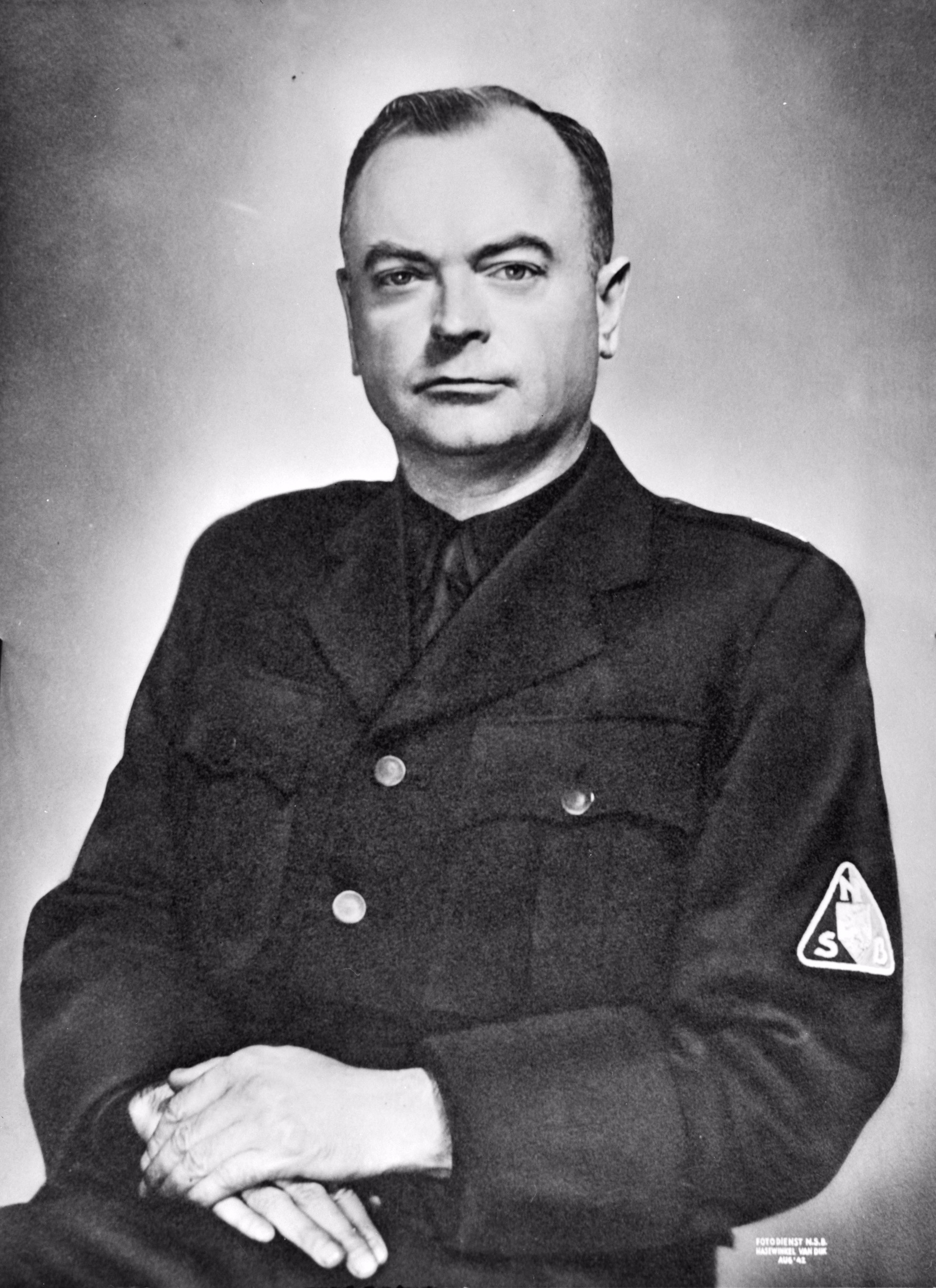
Anton Mussert (1894–1946), founder of the National Socialist Movement.

Meanwhile, the National Socialist Movement (Dutch: Nationaal Socialistische Beweging, NSB) had decided not to participate in the election. It was founded by engineer Anton Mussert in 1931, after Mussert had gotten some fame in his opposition against the Belgian-Netherlands treaty of 3 April 1925 and had been a member of the NU. Despite its name, it focused early on on Italian fascism instead of German national socialism. Unlike in Germany, antisemitism was largely absent from its program, although some members were antisemitic. Among its early members were Cornelis van Geelkerken, Van der Voort van Zijp, Hermannus Reydon and George Kettmann.

==== 1934–1939: Conversion to national-socialism ====
The NSB became the largest of the fascist parties. In the 1935 provincial elections it received 7.94% of the votes, the highest a new party had received since 1918. After the elections, the party radicalised to national-socialism, embracing Nazi racial theories. Many members left the party, while this was compensated by radical members joining the party. The 1937 general election ended up being a disappointing, receiving only 4,21% of the votes. The party radicalised further, and became politically isolated, but with a steady membership of 30,000.

=== World War II ===
In May 1940, the Germans invaded the Netherlands, which Mussert supported in a speech on 22 June 1940. The Germans largely took over the fascist movement, ending Dutch fascism as a separate movement. Political activity was limited by the occupation and over time all political parties except the NSB were forbidden. The remaining fascist and national socialist parties were forced to merge with the NSB.

=== Postwar ===
After the German surrender in May 1945, the NSB was outlawed. Many NSB members were arrested, with Mussert being sentenced to death.

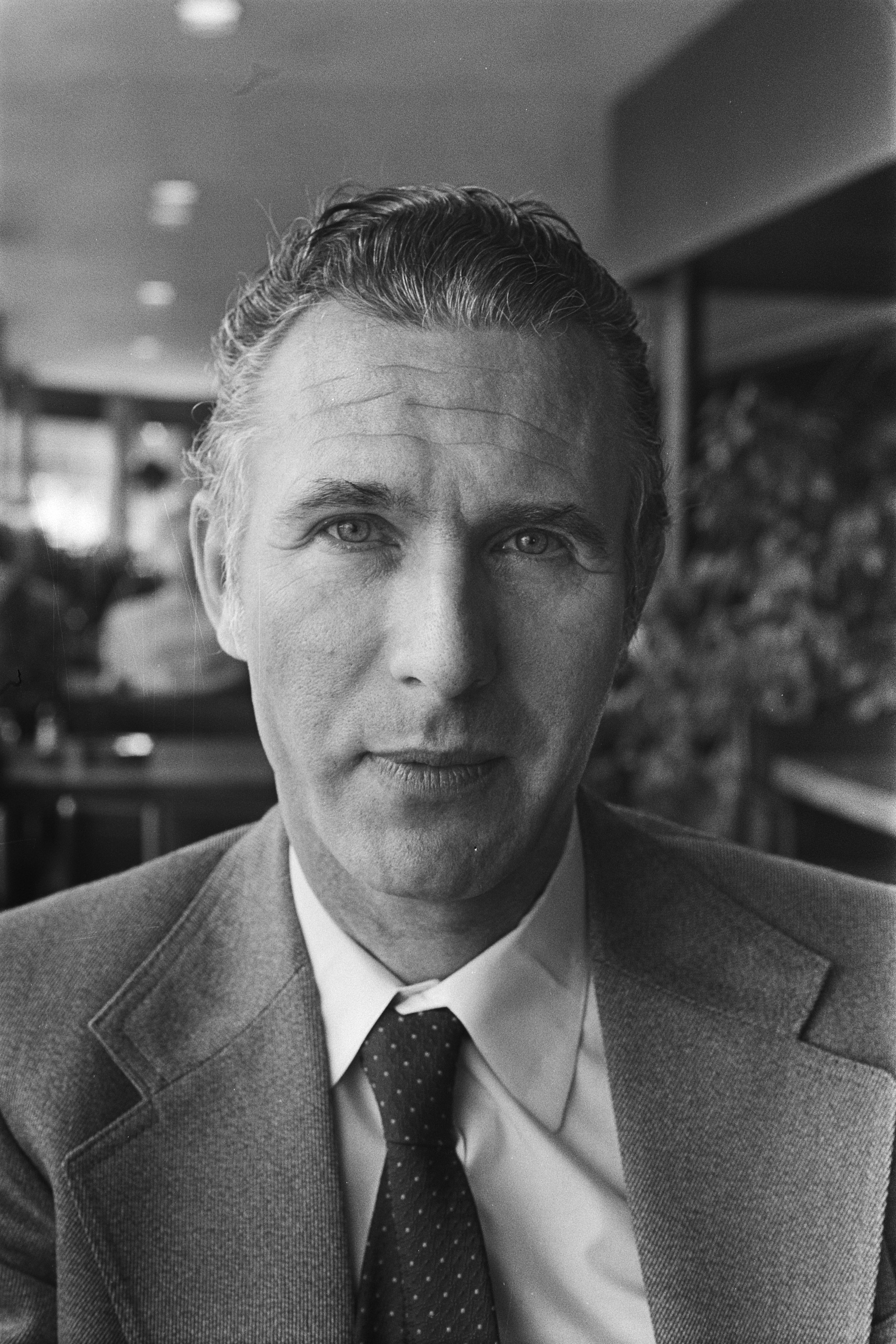
Joop Glimmerveen (1928–2022, leader of the Dutch People's Union, 1977.

In 1971, the Dutch People's Union (Dutch: Nederlandse Volks-Unie, NVU) was founded with the goal to rehabilitate convicted war criminals. Under Joop Glimmerveen's leadership, it became increasingly neo-Nazi. It participated in Dutch general elections between 1977 and 1982, but failed to win a seat. Although it was banned in 1978, it had been able to continue its activities because the party was not dissolved. Nevertheless, its activities stopped in the mid-1980s.

In 1980, a group of moderate members split off from the NVU to form the far-right Centre Party, which was succeeded by the Centre Party '86 in 1986. This party radicalised in the mid-1990s to neo-Nazism. The party was banned in 1997 and dissolved in 1998.

== See also ==
- National Socialist Dutch Workers Party
- Black Front (Netherlands)
- Nederlandsche SS

== Sources ==
- te Slaa, Robin; Klijn, Edwin (2021a) [First edition 2009]. De NSB: Ontstaan en opkomst van de Nationaal-Socialistische Beweging, 1931-1935 (in Dutch) (3 ed.). Boom. ISBN 978-90-244-4303-1.
- Huberts, Willem (14 July 2017b). "Non-revolutionary Dutch fascism redefines generic fascism" (PDF).
- Lucardie, Anthonie (2000). "Right-Wing Extremism in the Netherlands" (PDF).
