= Political uniform =

Distinctive clothing worn by members of a political movement

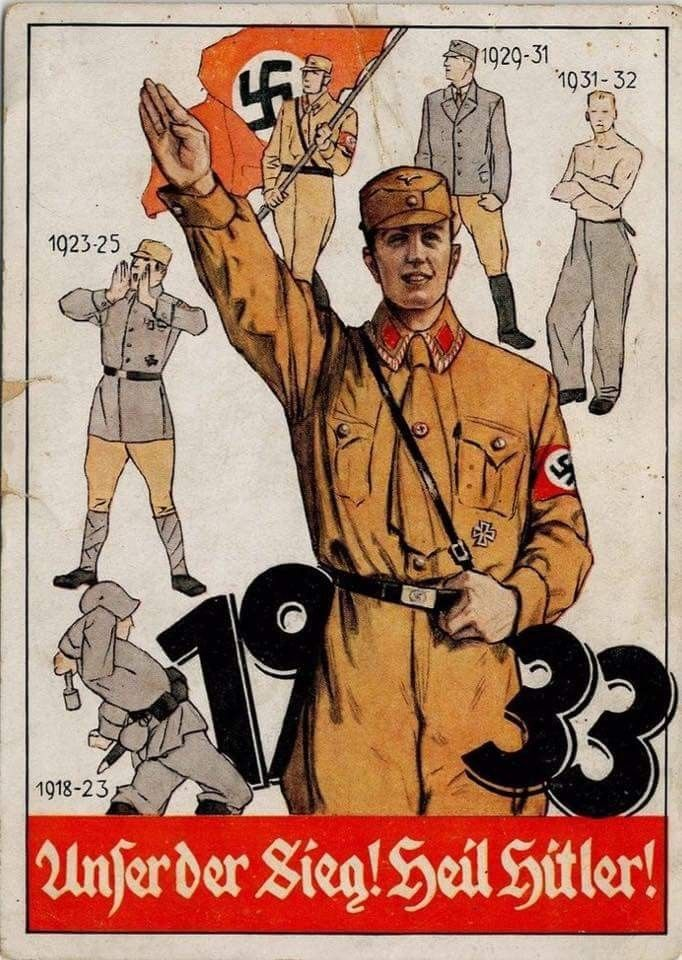
Members of the Sturmabteilung (SA), the paramilitary street thugs of the German Nazi Party, were called "brown shirts" after the color of the party uniform. Propaganda poster showing SA uniforms from the Freikorps movements after World War I, through the party ban 1923–25, the uniform ban 1930–1931 up to 1933 when Hitler became Chancellor.

A number of political movements have involved their members wearing uniforms, typically as a way of showing their identity in marches and demonstrations. The wearing of political uniforms has tended to be associated with radical political beliefs, typically at the far-right or far-left of politics, and can be used to imply a paramilitary type of organization.

A number of countries have legislation banning the wearing of political uniforms. In Germany, political uniforms have been forbidden since the end of the Nazi regime. Political uniforms were forbidden in Sweden during the period 1933–2002. The law existed to prevent Nazi groups from wearing uniforms. In the United Kingdom, the Public Order Act 1936, passed to control extremist political movements in the 1930s such as the British Union of Fascists, banned the wearing of political uniforms during marches. Attempts to legislate against the wearing of political uniform were difficult to implement, due to problems with defining what constitutes political uniform, but also in determining which groups were a threat to public order. Though this has rarely arisen in recent decades, in January 2015 Paul Golding, the leader of Britain First, was convicted for wearing a political uniform. Later in November 2016 the party's deputy leader Jayda Fransen was also convicted for wearing a political uniform.

== List of parties with political uniforms ==
Notable uniformed political groups have included:

- The Chinese Communist Party, which dressed its members in green, loose fitting fatigues or the more formal Mao suit
- The Brownshirts, or Sturmabteilung, of the Nazi Party

"Blackshirts"

- The Iranian Azure Party
- The Black Front in the Netherlands
- The Black Legion, often nicknamed as the "Blackshirts" or simply "Blacks" in Croatia
- The Blackshirts, Fascist paramilitary groups in Fascist Italy
- The British Union of Fascists, a fascist political party of the 1930s in the United Kingdom
- The Patriotic People's Movement of Finland
- The Blackshirts, an atheist organisation in India
- The Dutch Fascist Union
- Golden Dawn, a neo-Nazi political party in Greece
- The British National Fascisti
- The Peruvian Revolutionary Union
- The Russian National Autonomous Party, a party in the Subcarpathian Rus' region within the Second Czechoslovak Republic
- The Dutch Weerbaarheidsafdeling

"Blueshirts"

- The Blueshirts, or Army Comrades Association, an Irish political organisation set up by General Eoin O'Duffy in 1932
- The Blueshirts (Italian Nationalist Association) in Italy
- The Chinese Blue Shirt Society, a secret clique within the Kuomintang
- The British Fascists, the first avowedly fascist organisation in the United Kingdom
- The Falange Militia in Spain
- The Lăncieri of the Romanian National-Christian Defense League
- The National Syndicalists in Portugal
- The National Unity Party in Canada
- The Solidarité Française and the Mouvement Franciste in France

"Greenshirts"

- The Brazilian Integralist Action
- The French Comités de défense paysanne in France
- The Juventudes de Acción Popular of CEDA in Spain
- The Green Shirt Movement for Social Credit in the United Kingdom
- The Romanian Iron Guard movement
- The Hungarian National Socialist Agricultural Labourers' and Workers' Party
- The Greenshirts were a wing of the Irish National Corporate Party
- The Flemish Verdinaso in Belgium
- The Yugoslav Radical Union
- The Young Egypt Party

"Greyshirts"

- The Aria Party in Iran
- The Norwegian Fatherland League
- The Greyshirts, a South African Nazi organisation
- The National League of Sweden originally part of the General Electoral League and later an independent fascist party
- The Latvian Pērkonkrusts movement
- The Grijze Werfbrigade (Grey Defence Brigade), a Flemish paramilitary organisation of Vlaams Nationaal Verbond, predecessor of the Dietsche Militie that was formed in 1940s

"Redshirts"

- The Redshirts that unified Italy
- The Ratniks, a Bulgarian national-socialist organisation
- The Red Shirts of the Southern United States
- The Red Shirts of Mexico
- The United Front for Democracy Against Dictatorship in Thailand
- The Economic Freedom Fighters in South Africa

Other:

- The Russian Black Hundreds also known as "Yellowshirts"
- The Brazilian Patrianovist Imperial Action had the Imperial Patrianovist Guard which wore white shirts
- Free Peru uses a white shirt with red cuffs
- The Gold shirts, a Mexican fascist movement
- The League of Nationalist Action also known as Ironshirts in Syria
- The New Force in Italy is associated with the "Whiteshirts"
- The white uniform of Singapore's People's Action Party
- The Proud Boys, an American Neo-fascist militant organization.
- Silver Legion of America, commonly known as the Silver Shirts, an American fascist organization founded by William Dudley Pelley
- The Syrian Steelshirts
- The White Shirts Society, a clandestine fascist terrorist group in South Korea

Political uniforms have sometimes taken the form of headwear:

- Red berets were worn as distinguishing devices of the Spanish Carlists
- Members of the Provisional Irish Republican Army and Sinn Féin have worn black berets in demonstrations, or black balaclavas for anonymity
- Black berets are also worn over hoods by members of ETA
- The Black Panther Party
- Members of the Swiss neo-Nazi group Junge Tat wear forest green colored balaclavas with a large white Tiwaz rune on them.
- Atomwaffen Division members are known for wearing skull mask neck gaiters/balaclavas. This signature face covering has also been adopted by other neo-Nazi groups like The Base as well as militant far-right and neo-fascist sympathizers in general.
- The MAGA Hat of the MAGA movement worn by Trump supporters and the Trumpist faction of the Republican Party (United States).

Other uniformed movements:

- Black Sash a non-violent white women's anti-apartheid organization in South Africa
- Ku Klux Klan in the United States
- Britain First, a far-right group who wear green jackets and flat caps
- Fruit of Islam, the paramilitary wing of the Nation of Islam.
- The Brown Berets
- Yellow vests movement, a populist political movement that began in France in 2018.
- Afrikaner Weerstandsbeweging, a neo-Nazi Afrikaner nationalist political organization in South Africa.
- Reform UK Far-right UK political party who wear football shirts with their party name on.

The youth sections of some political movements have also been uniformed:

- Hitler Youth (the youth wing of the German Nazi Party)
- Gioventù Italiana del Littorio, youth organization of the Italian National Fascist Party
- Komsomol, youth organization in the Soviet Union
- the International Falcon Movement has many branches around the world with some having uniforms and being to varying degrees associated with political parties, the Swedish Branch Örnar|Unga Örnar had uniforms until the ban on uniforms in 1933 by the Swedish Social Democratic Party which led to them splitting from it. In Austria, they maintain their connection to the SPÖ and have a blue uniform with a red tie
- Free German Youth (German Democratic Republic)
- Pancasila Youth, Indonesian far-right paramilitary organization
- The youth wing of the Egyptian Wafd Party wore uniforms and were called Blueshirts

== See also ==
- Armband
- The Black Shorts, a parody of fascist uniforms in the Jeeves novels of P. G. Wodehouse.
- Political colour
- Political symbol
- Black bloc
