= Carel Gerretson =

Dutch writer, essayist, historian, and politician

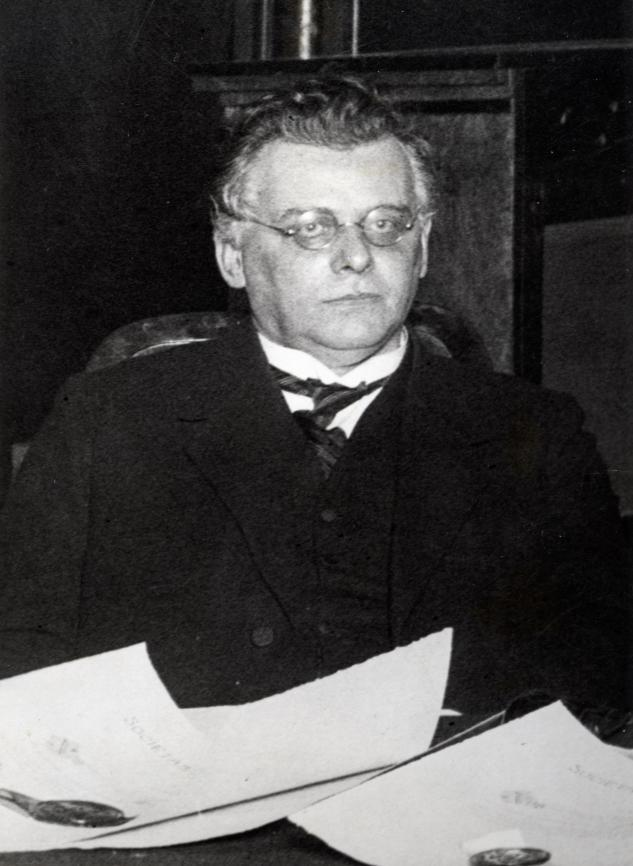
- Gerretson in 1939

Personal details
- Born: Frederik Carel Gerretson; 9 February 1884 Kralingen, Netherlands
- Died: 27 October 1958 (aged 74) Utrecht, Netherlands
- Party: Christian Historical Union; National Union
- Education: Koninklijke Militaire Academie; University of Utrecht; Solvay Institute of Sociology; University of Heidelberg

Frederik Carel Gerretson (born Kralingen, 9 February 1884 – died Utrecht, 27 October 1958) was a Dutch writer, essayist, historian, and politician.

== Early years ==
Gerretson was educated in a public elementary school in Rotterdam before continuing his education there and in Amersfoort. He undertook officer training at the Koninklijke Militaire Academie in Breda before switching to academic study at the University of Utrecht, the Solvay Institute of Sociology and the University of Heidelberg.

== Academic career ==
Gerretson was a professor of colonial history at the University of Utrecht. He was particularly interested in the Dutch colonial experience, especially in the Dutch East Indies. In this area he was involved in a noted academic dispute with the historian Annie Romein-Verschoor over the personality of Jan Pieterszoon Coen. Being a Marxist, Romein-Verschoor characterized Coen as an imperialist. Gerretson, a staunch nationalist and supporter of the empire, argued that Coen should be praised. Gerretson suggested that Coen was not widely appreciated because the Dutch people tend to avoid cult of personality.

Gerretson also published books on a number of books on the petroleum industry, with works such as Geschiedenis der "Koninklijke" and a history of Royal Dutch, before branching out into other areas. Gerretson had been a secretary and board member at Bataafsche Petroleum Maatschappij, a predecessor of Royal Dutch, since 1917. He was awarded the prestigious Constantijn Huygens Prize in 1950 for his writings. He had also written for a number of newspapers and journals including De Groene Amsterdammer, Utrechts Provinciaal en Stedelijk Dagblad, Leeuwarder Courant, Het Vaderland, Nieuwe Rotterdamsche Courant, Algemeen Handelsblad and numerous others.

Using the pseudonym Geerten Gossaert, Gerretson also became noted as a poet with his work De moeder receiving regular reprints. He also published works under the name Arthur Lawick.

== Political career ==
Gerretson's nationalist principles led him to politics and he initially was associated with the conservative Calvinist Christian Historical Union (CHU) before moving to the fascist politics of the National Union, of which he was one of the founders in 1925. In 1933 he took the leadership of the 'Corporative Concentration', an attempt to unite the Netherlands' divided extreme right spearheaded by Alfred Haighton, although Gerretson proved a divisive leader as he clashed frequently with Jan Baars. As a consequence Baars and his followers left the movement and the General Dutch Fascist League, which was the main entity in the alliance, collapsed, allowing the initiative to pass to Nazi-inclined elements such as the National Socialist Movement in the Netherlands of Anton Mussert and Ernst Herman van Rappard's National Socialist Dutch Workers Party.

Gerretson returned to the CHU and became a leading figure in the party at the head of a pro-colonial faction based in Utrecht. A strong voice on the right of the party, noted for his rhetoric, Gerretson would later become an isolated figure within the CHU. He was elected to the Senate of the States-General of the Netherlands in 1951 for the CHU as a representative for South Holland and served in the first parliamentary commission for foreign policy, where he was in disagreement with the spirit of decolonisation that pervaded in the commission. Gerretson was a CHU candidate in the 1956 general election but lost his Senate seat. He was a policy adviser for the party from 1951 to 1955 and was also a regular contributor to the CHU organ De Nederlander.
