= Rappard =

Rappard is a surname. It may refer to:

- Anthon van Rappard (1858–1892), Dutch painter and draughtsman
- Dora Rappard (1842–1923), Swiss missionary and hymn writer
- Ernst Herman van Rappard (1899–1953), Dutch National Socialist and anti-Semite
- Frederik van Rappard (1798–1862), Dutch politician
- Fritz-Georg von Rappard (1892–1946), German Nazi general during World War II executed for war crimes
- Harry van Rappard (1897–1982), Dutch sprinter
- Oscar van Rappard (1896–1962), Dutch track and field athlete and soccer player
- Josias Cornelis Rappard (1824–1898), Dutch soldier and artist
- William Rappard (1883–1958), American academic and diplomat

It may also refer to

- Centre William Rappard, Geneva, Switzerland, built between 1923 and 1926 to house the International Labour Office
