= Dutch Fascist Union =

Dutch political party (1932–1933)

Dutch Fascist Union Nederlandse Fascistische Unie
- Abbreviation: NFU
- Founded: 1932
- Registered: 26 February 1933
- Dissolved: c. 1933
- Newspaper: De Aanval
- Youth wing: Fascist Youth Union
- Paramilitary wing: Fascist Storm Troopers
- Ideology: Fascism
- Political position: Far-right
- Religion: Catholicism

The Dutch Fascist Union, (Note: Dutch: Nederlandse Fascistische Unie, abbr. NFU) officially the General Dutch Fascist Union, (Note: Dutch: Algemene Nederlandse Fascistische Unie) was a fascist, pro-Catholic political party in the Netherlands. It was formed in 1932 and registered as a political party in 1933. It contested the 1933 parliamentary election, garnering only 0.19% of the popular vote and winning no seats. It faded from written records shortly afterwards. The NFU had a paramilitary wing, a youth wing, and a publication titled De Aanval (lit. 'The Attack').

== History ==
During the interwar period, Dutch fascists were split into three groups: followers of Italian fascism (or classical fascism), fascists who supported the Catholic Church in particular, and secular fascists who identified with Nazism and antisemitism. The Dutch Fascist Union (NFU) was founded in 1932 as an attempt to unite the Catholic fascists. Many members had split from the larger General Dutch Fascist League. It was registered as a political party in the Netherlands on 26 February 1933.

The NFU contested the 1933 parliamentary election, receiving 1,771 votes (0.05%) and no seats. In The Hague the party won 0.19% of the popular vote, in Amsterdam 0.03%, in Haarlem 0.09%, in Utrecht 0.18%, and in Zwolle 0.28%. The NFU disappeared from written records soon thereafter.

== Ideology ==
During the interwar period, some fascist parties in the Netherlands – such as the National Socialist Dutch Workers Party – were criticised by other fascist parties for their perceived moderateness and focus on corporatism. The criticised groups were labelled "right-wing fascists" as opposed to "far-right fascists" who closely followed Italian fascism or Nazism. The NFU advocated its own loosely defined ideology called volks-fascisme (lit. 'people-fascism').

== Leadership ==
Leading figures of the party included Karel Eduard van Charante and Tony W. Hooykaas.

== Membership ==
The NFU membership reportedly never exceeded 1,000 followers.

== Non-party wings ==
The NFU had an armed wing – a militia known as the Fascist Storm Troopers whose members dressed in black uniforms. It also had a youth wing named the Fascist Youth Union.

== Publications ==
The NFU published De Aanval (lit. 'The Attack').

== See also ==
- Black Front (Netherlands)
