= Nuland (disambiguation) =

Nuland may refer to:

- Nuland, a village in the Netherlands

Nuland is also a surname and may refer to:

- Sherwin B. Nuland (1930–2014), American surgeon
- Victoria Nuland (born 1961), American diplomat
