= Het Nieuwe Volk =

- Type: Fortnightly (1940), Weekly (1940-1941)
- Editor: Johan Hepp
- Founded: 15 September 1940
- Ceased publication: 4 October 1941
- Political alignment: Nazism
- Language: Dutch language
- Headquarters: Utrecht

Het Nieuwe Volk ('The New People') was a Dutch-language newspaper published in Utrecht, Netherlands between 15 June 1940 and 4 October 1941. Het Nieuwe Volk was the organ of the National Socialist Dutch Workers Party of Ernst Herman van Rappard. It was founded as a continuation of De Nationaal-socialist. The newspaper was initially published fortnightly, but became a weekly paper on 24 August 1940. Johan Hepp was the editor of Het Nieuwe Volk.
