= Fatherland League =

Fatherland League may refer to:

- Fatherland League (Netherlands)
- Fatherland League (Norway)
