= Arnold Meijer =

Dutch fascist politician (1905–1965)

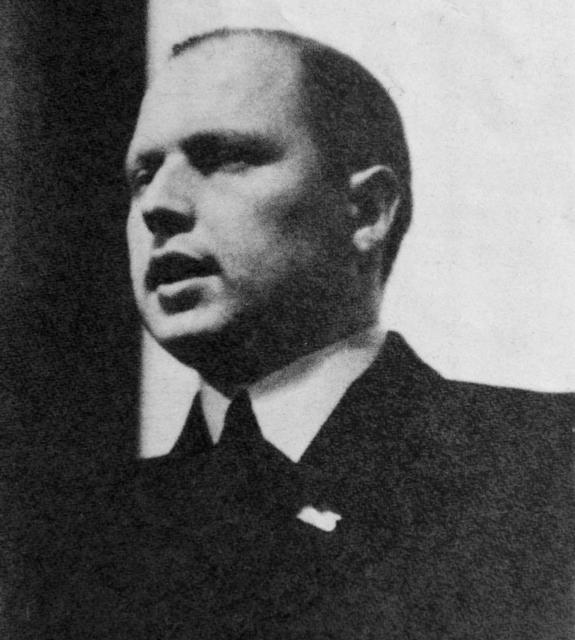
- Meijer in the 1930s
- Born: Arnoldus Jozephus Meijer; 5 May 1905; Haarlemmermeer, Netherlands
- Died: 17 June 1965 (aged 60); Oisterwijk, Netherlands
- Citizenship: Dutch
- Known for: Fascist politician
- Opponents: Roman Catholic State Party; General Dutch Fascist League; National Socialist Movement (Netherlands)

Arnoldus Jozephus Meijer (5 May 1905 – 17 June 1965) was a Dutch fascist politician.

Meijer was born in Haarlemmermeer. Brought up a devout Roman Catholic and educated in a number of seminaries he soon became influenced by Wouter Lutkie, a Catholic priest and fascist. After a brief stopover in the Roman Catholic State Party, which he found far too moderate, Meijer began to write for the authoritarian De Rijkseenheid and the General Dutch Fascist League's De Fascist. He soon joined the League and, having inherited money from his father, launched his own journal Zwart Front. Rising to a position of influence in the League, he quarreled with leader Jan Baars and in 1934 split from the group, taking a number of followers with him. Before long he had revived the Zwart Front name for his new movement and even visited Benito Mussolini with Lutkie to gain the fascist leader's approval.

The Front failed to make much impact in elections, notably managing only 0.2% of the vote in the 1939 general election (although Meijer managed a 21.4% vote share in Oisterwijk). As a result, Meijer's faction was absorbed into the new National Front in 1940. This movement was banned on 13 December 1941 by the Nazis, largely due to their Catholicism. Despite the ban Meijer was allowed to simply retire from politics. He was arrested on 27 October 1944 and was imprisoned in the former SS concentration camp in Vught until on 7 May 1945 he escaped to Belgium. That same year he published a book about the treatment of former collaborators, Pruisische practijken in herrijzend Nederland!. He returned to the Netherlands in 1946 to face a five-year sentence for aiding the enemy, which was reduced to four years on appeal.

Meijer was released from prison in 1948 and returned to politics, writing for the Aristo journal which was sympathetic to Lutkie. He did not however resume his earlier involvement in party politics. He died, aged 60, in Oisterwijk.

Meijer was more attracted to Italian fascism than to German Nazism, albeit he shared his harsh antisemitism with the Nazis. Later on, however, he softened his views somewhat and wrote letters condemning the persecution of the Jews to Adolf Hitler.
