= Blue Shirts =

Blue Shirts can refer to:

== Politics ==
- The American National Blue Shirt Minutemen
- Blueshirt (socialist)
- The British Fascists
- The Blueshirts, the paramilitary wing of the National Unity Party (Parti National Social Chrétien du Canada)
- The Chinese Blue Shirts Society
- Blue shirt, typical uniform for the HaNoar HaOved VeHaLomed Israeli youth organization
- The Free German Youth, the official socialist youth movement of the German Democratic Republic and the Socialist Unity Party of Germany
- The French groups:
  - Mouvement Franciste
  - Solidarité Française
- The Irish Blueshirts
- Tal-Ġakketta Blu (Blueshirts), the paramilitary/security services wing of the Maltese Nationalist Party
- National Syndicalists (Portugal)
- The Romanian Lăncieri
- The Falange Militia
- The Egyptian Blue Shirts (al-Qumsan al-zarqa'), a junior movement of the Wafd Party
- The Blueshirts (Italian Nationalist Association)
- National Socialist Workers' Party (Sweden), version of the SA that had blue shirts

== Sports ==
- The Toronto Blueshirts
- "Broadway Blueshirts" or simply "Blueshirts", a common nickname for the New York Rangers
- in American college sports, a colloquial designation for a walk-on assumed to eventually obtain a scholarship; derivative of redshirt

== Other ==
- Les Tuniques Bleues, a Belgian comic about the American Civil War
- Derogatory term for Transportation Security Administration Agents comparing them to the Nazi Brown Shirts

== See also ==
- Blue collar (disambiguation)
