= Alfred Haighton =

Dutch businessman (1896–1943)

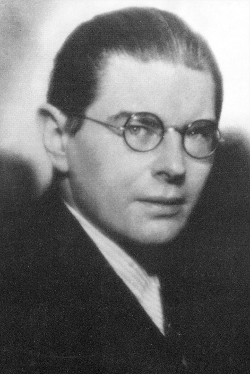
- Haighton (c.1926)
- Born: Coenraad Alfred Augustus Haighton; 26 October 1896; Rotterdam
- Died: 19 April 1943 (aged 46); Beekbergen
- Citizenship: Dutch
- Occupation: Businessman
- Known for: Fascist politician and collaborator with Nazism
- Political party: Verbond van Actualisten, Fascistische Jongeren Bond, National Socialist Dutch Workers Party, Zwart Front

Coenraad Alfred Augustus Haighton (26 October 1896 – 13 April 1943) was a millionaire businessman and the leader of the Netherlands' first fascist movement.

== Fascism ==
From a privileged background, Haighton was born in Rotterdam and was well educated, studying in Los Angeles and producing a thesis on Arthur Schopenhauer, although he was also physically disabled for his entire life. Haighton's father had been a highly successful businessman, making a fortune in particular from his lottery insurance business LOTISICO. He died early and as such Alfred Haighton inherited the highly profitable business, allowing him to devote much of his time to politics. He soon became close to H.A. Sinclair de Rochemont and in 1924 the two set up the Verbond van Actualisten, a group which looked for inspiration to Italian fascism. The group broke down in 1927 and Haighton then put his money into a journal, De Bezem and eventually his own movement, the Fascistische Jongeren Bond. This movement was depleted in 1932 when his close ally Jan Baars broke from him to set up the General Dutch Fascist League (ANFB).

== Nazism ==
Haighton had become a strong antisemite and as such led the followers he had left into the National Socialist Dutch Workers Party (NSNAP), although once again his abrasive personality meant that the relationship was not to last. He dropped out of politics for a spell before joining Arnold Meijer's Zwart Front, although he declined to join the National Front when this group absorbed the Zwart Front in 1940. Officially a member of the NSNAP again he took little role in active politics and instead concentrated on his antisemitic writing and literary pursuits.

== Literature ==
In 1938 Haighton purchased the literary journal De Nieuwe Gids, a work that held a high reputation amongst the Dutch artistic set. Under Haighton however the once respected journal became intensely partisan, presenting a highly pro-Nazi Germany line. Writers such as Jan Eekhout, a staunchly pro-Nazi novelist noted for his use of archaic and dialect Dutch words as part of an attempt to construct rustic literature, were featured and widely praised under Haighton.

The Dutch literary establishment reacted negatively to Haighton's stewardship of the magazine, to the point that by 1943 De Nieuwe Gids had only 98 registered subscribers. Haighton died suddenly in Beekbergen that same year, from a heart attack.
