= Blackshirts (disambiguation) =

Blackshirts were originally the paramilitary wing of the Kingdom of Italy.

Blackshirts or Black Shirt may also refer to:

- Blackshirts (India), an anti-religious quasi-political movement
- British Union of Fascists (BUF), nicknamed "Blackshirts"
  - British Blackshirts, paramilitary wing of the BUF
  - The Blackshirt, the official BUF newspaper
- Blackshirts (American football), the University of Nebraska-Lincoln team defense's nickname
- Black Shirt (film), a 1933 Italian drama film
- Guard of the Blackshirts, the paramilitary wing of the Russian National Autonomous Party
- "La Camisa Negra" (The Black Shirt), a 2006 non-political song by Juanes
