= Fascist paramilitary =

Paramilitary organization

A fascist paramilitary is a type of paramilitary fighting force – whether armed, unarmed, or merely symbolic – that is independent of regular military command and is established for the defence and advancement of a social-political movement that adheres to the far-right authoritarian and radical nationalist political ideology of fascism.

Because fascism is an inherently militarist ideology, there are very few varieties of fascism for which, after any such variety gains significant or centralized power in a polity, paramilitaries do not play a central role in said polity; accordingly, some kind of paramilitary participation is almost always a basic requirement of membership in nearly all fascist movements.

Fascist paramilitaries have seen action in both peacetime and wartime. Most fascist paramilitaries' members wear political uniforms indicating their participation in, and allegiance to, a given paramilitary force. Many such organizations have chosen their groups' names on the basis of the colours of their uniforms.

The first definite fascist paramilitary was the Blackshirts of Italian Fascism led by Benito Mussolini. While many of the Blackshirts were former members of the Arditi who had fought in World War I or the Fascio of the immediate post-war years, the most direct inspiration for the first fascist paramilitary was Giuseppe Garibaldi's Redshirts.

A number of other fascist movements established paramilitaries modeled after the Italian original, most notably Nazism with its racialist view and its Sturmabteilung and Schutzstaffel. Others include:

- the Fascist Defence Force of the British Union of Fascists
- the Blueshirts under Eoin O'Duffy in Ireland
- the Gold Shirts in Mexico
- the Greenshirts in Brazil
- the Heimwehr in Austria, in the 1920s and 1930s
- the Legionary Greenshirts of the Iron Guard in Romania
- the Iron Wolf organization in Lithuania
- the Legião Portuguesa in Portugal

Several fascist movements took their cue from the Nazi Sturmabteilung rather than the fascist Blackshirts, such as the Greyshirts in South Africa and the Silver Legion of America. Following the Axis invasion of Albania, the occupation forces formed the Albanian Militia under the Blackshirts. Several fascist paramilitaries were active in Romania including the Lăncieri.

Some Nazi movements have also established paramilitary youth organizations similar to fascist ones such as the Hitler Youth or the Mocidade Portuguesa.

A number of fascist paramilitaries have been deployed in conventional warfare. For example, in the later years of World War II the Italian Blackshirts developed into the Black Brigades. Likewise, the combat wing of the Nazi Schutzstaffel, the Waffen-SS, fought in many major battles of World War II. The Einsatzgruppen were death squads active in Eastern Europe which carried out the Holocaust and other political killings. In an act of desperation, the Nazis deployed remnants of the Hitler Youth and Sturmabteilung against the Red Army in the Battle of Berlin. At the eleventh hour of the war, the Nazis laid plans for a guerrilla resistance movement they called the Werwolf. However, these plans amounted to little more than a handful of sabotages and assassinations which were ineffective.

Neo-Nazis have used the white power skinhead scene as a recruitment base for Neo-Nazi paramilitaries like Combat 18. Soccer hooliganism throughout Europe is another source of recruits. Some groups in the white supremacist wing of the militia movement in the United States can be seen as neo-Nazi paramilitaries. The differentiating factor between fascism and Nazism, is the racial aspect of Nazism called Nordicism, where as orthodox fascism was not known to have a viewpoint on race, Nazism believed that the Germanic race was superior. Both ideologies are considered hard-right. Both ideologies agreed on economics and nationalism, however they differed on race, and had different end goals.
