= Elle van den Bogaart =

Dutch children's writer

Elle van den Boogaart (born April 6, 1959, in Nuland) is a Dutch Young adult novelist. She is known for writing realistic stories about contemporary issues for youths aged 12 years and older.

== Literary career ==
Van den Boogaart debuted in 2003 with her novel De gele scooter, a novel starring teenagers who suffer from sexual abuse. The book was received with mixed professional criticism and limited reviewer attention. Reviewers praised her realistic portrayal of police and youth workers, and her ability to write on heavy topics with the necessary sensitivity and without resorting to sensationalism, but criticised her simplistic portrayal of perpetrators of sexual abuse and her overall simple writing style. De Gele Scooter was awarded with the 2005 Debut Novel award from the Jonge Jury.

Van den Boogaart's follow-up novels would continue her realistic but sensitive approach of broaching heavy subjects to young people, taking on topics such as suicide (Krassen, 2004), juvenile delinquency (Duizend Kilometer, 2005), child prostitution (Prooi, 2006), radicalization, (De val, 2009), drug abuse (Verdoofd, 2010) and drug trafficking (No Deal, 2012), all from teenagers' perspectives. Prooi (2006) would again attract attention from the Jonge Jury as part of their list of core titles in 2006. Van den Boogaart takes inspiration from the stories of police officers and youth workers, as well as real police dossiers. Typically her books feature multiple protagonists, shifting perspectives so as to show different sides of the story.

== Personal life ==
Van den Boogaart was born in Nuland, North Brabant in 1959. She studied youth social work in Eindhoven where after she received her bachelor's degree she found work as a hospital psychologist. She maintains her day job as a psychological worker alongside writing. Van den Boogaart is married and has four children.

== Bibliography ==
- Twee seconden (2018) Holland Publishing, Haarlem, ISBN 978-90-251-1422-0
- Lijfstraf (2015) Holland Publishing, Haarlem, ISBN 978-90-251-1286-8
- No Deal (2012) Van Holkema & Warendorf, Houten ISBN 978-90-00-31340-2
- Verdoofd (2010) Van Holkema & Warendorf, Houten, ISBN 978-90-475-1490-9
- De val (2009) Van Holkema & Warendorf, Houten, ISBN 978-90-475-0728-4
- Vermist (2007) Van Holkema & Warendorf, Houten, ISBN 978-90-475-0118-3
- Prooi (2006) uitg. Van Holkema & Warendorf, Houten, ISBN 978-90-269-1751-6
- Girlz stuff (2006) uitg. Van Holkema & Warendorf, Houten, ISBN 90-269-1713-9
- Duizend kilometer (2005) uitg. Van Holkema & Warendorf, Houten, ISBN 978-90-269-1675-5
- Krassen (2004) uitg. Van Holkema & Warendorf, Houten, ISBN 978-90-269-9850-8
- De gele scooter (2003) uitg. Van Holkema & Warendorf, Houten, ISBN 978-90-00-30639-8 (reprinted in 2005)
