= Lambert van Nistelrooij =

Dutch politician (born 1953)

Lambert Van Nistelrooij MEP
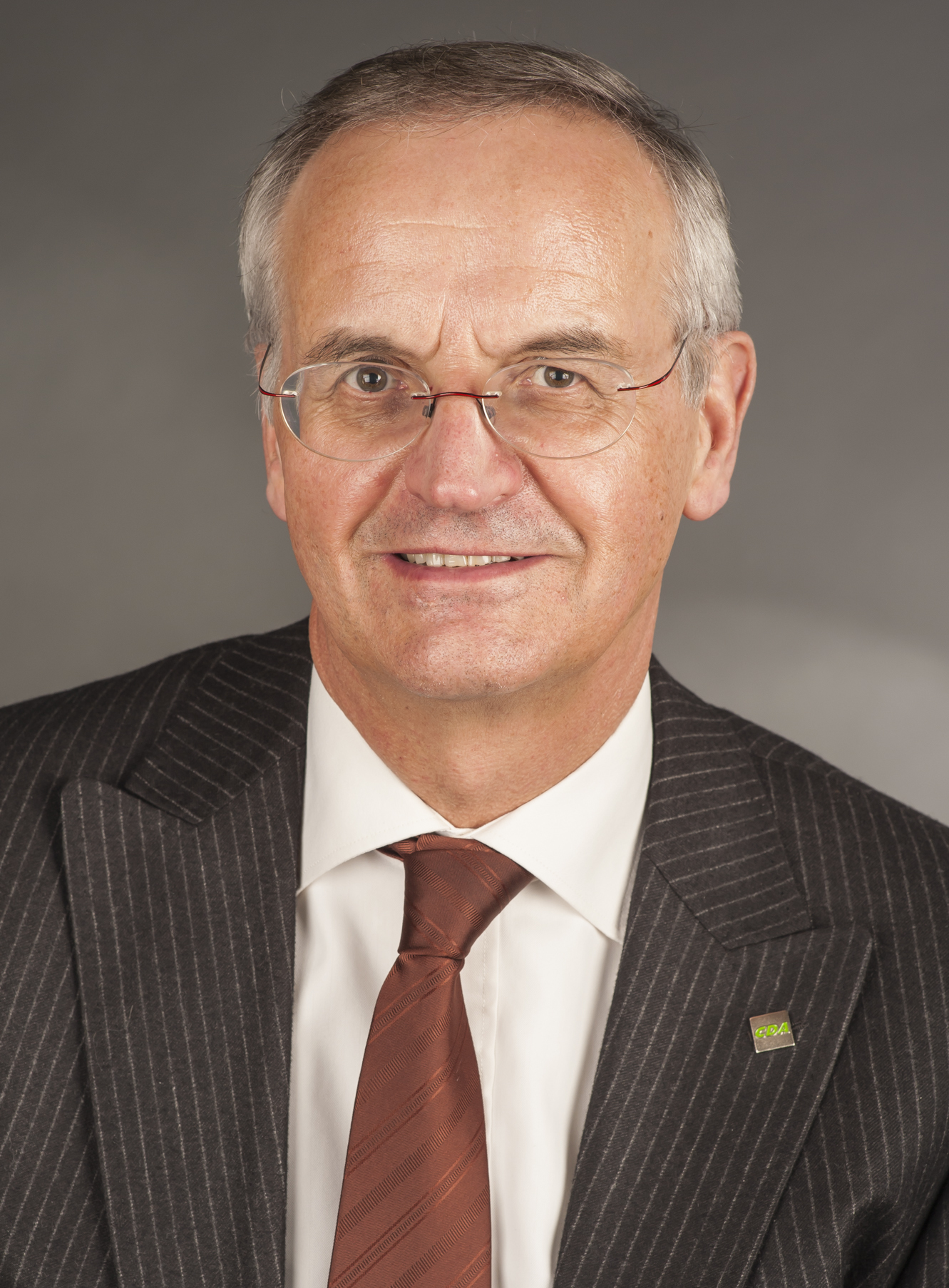

Member of the European Parliament
- Incumbent
- Assumed office 20 July 2004
- Constituency: Netherlands

Personal details
- Born: Lambertus Jacobus Jozef Van Nistelrooij; 5 March 1953 (age 73) Nuland, Netherlands
- Party: Christian Democratic Appeal; European People's Party
- Education: University of Nijmegen
- Website: Official website

Lambertus Jacobus Jozef van Nistelrooij (born 5 March 1953) is a Dutch politician who served as a Member of the European Parliament (MEP) from 2004 till 2019. He is a member of the Christian Democratic Appeal, part of the European People's Party.

== Biography ==
=== Youth and education ===
Lambert van Nistelrooij was born on 5 March 1953 in Nuland, Netherlands. He studied Human geography at the University of Nijmegen and graduated in 1974.

=== Work and politics ===
After his graduation, Lambert van Nistelrooij was a teacher for a while. He also worked at the Province of Gelderland and the agricultural organisation of North-Brabant Christian Farmers (NCB).

At 24 years old, he was a member of the city council of Nuland. In 1982, he joined the Brabant States Group of the CDA. Between 1991 and 2003, Lambert van Nistelrooij was a member of the Deputies of the North-Brabant Province where he was responsible for public health, care for the elderly, housing, urban innovation and internationalisation.

He later became a member of the Dutch delegation to the Committee of the Regions in Brussels and Treasurer of the House of Dutch Provinces in Brussels. He was also Vice President of the Assembly of European Regions for some time.

=== European Parliament ===
Lambert van Nistelrooij got elected as a Member of the European Parliament in 2004 and reelected in 2009 and 2014. He was a member of the EP Committee on Regional Development. He was also substitute member of the EP committee on Internal Market and member of the delegation for EU-relations with Latin-America, Brazil and Mercosur.

During his second mandate he was also engaged in energy and telecommunications in his function as a substitute member of the EP Committee on Industry, Research and Energy. He was also on the delegations for relations with the countries of South Asia, Maghreb countries and the Arab Maghreb Union, and the Euro-Latin American Parliamentary Assembly.

Lambert van Nistelrooij was the European Parliament Rapporteur and Negotiator for the European Structural Funds and the European Investment Fund (2014–2020). The budget for this amounts to €222 billion.

== Personal life ==
Lambert van Nistelrooij is married. He lives in Diessen and holds the title of Knight of the Order of Orange-Nassau.

Besides his work as an MEP, he has a special interest in civil society. He is Chairman of the Advisory Board of "Smart Homes", the National Centre for Home Automation and Smart Living, and Prisma, an institution for people with intellectual disabilities.

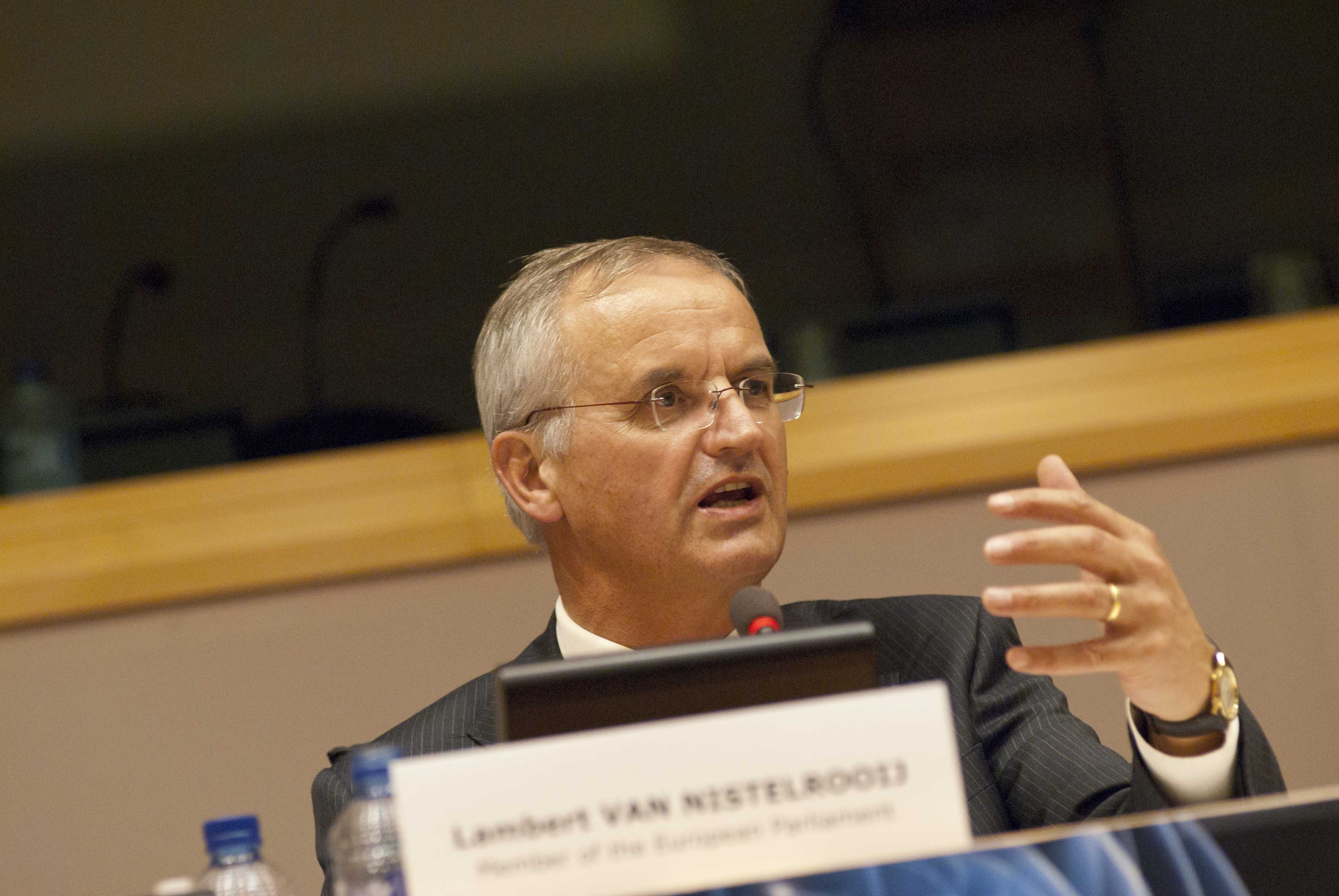

== Curriculum vitae ==
Studies

- 1974: Human Geography University of Nijmegen (cum laude).

Professional Activities

- 1979-1983: Assistant Metropolitan Tilburg
- 1983-1988: Policy province of Gelderland
- 1987-1991: Departmental management training and organisational development, North Brabant Christian Farmers

'Political activities

- 1978: City Council Member Nuland
- 1982-1991: Brabant States Group of the CDA
- 1991-2003: Deputy of the Province of North Brabant for health, care for the elderly, housing, urban renewal and internationalisation
- 1992-2003: President and Vice-President of the Assembly of the Regions of Europe
- 1995-2003: Delegation and rapporteur of the Committee of the Regions
- 1995-2003: Various positions in the Regional Assembly of the Council of Europe
- 2004-2009: President of the Assembly of European Border Regions

Other

- 1999-2003: Chairman of Alive: European Challenge to Ageing
- 2001-2010: President 'Perspekt Mark for Care', Utrecht
- 2003–present: Chairman Advisory Board "Smart Homes", National Centre for automation and Smart Living, Eersel
- 2006–present: Member of the Supervisory Board of Valkenhof, nursing and care, Valkenswaard.
- 2009–present: Chairman of the Knowledge4Innovation (K4I) Forum of the European Parliament.
- 2011–present: Chairman of the Supervisory Board of Prism, an institution for people with intellectual disabilities, Waalwijk
