= National Blue Shirt Minutemen =

American anti-fascist organization

Flag.

National Blue Shirt Minutemen was an American anti-fascist organization of New York City from 1936. The National Blue Shirt Minutemen claimed a membership of 10,000 in 1937 around Brooklyn. In 1936, they interrupted a pro-Nazi rally in Brooklyn, burning Hitler in effigy and yelling insults at American Nazis. They charged the police lines four times.

Another group that existed at approximately the same time principles was the Blue Shirts of Loyalty, later the Sons of Loyalty based in Indianapolis. The group claimed to have suppressed pro-Nazi radio programs and pamphlets. At first the group had a unique dues system in which the initiation fee was $3 for the first 2,000 members, at which point it would change to $5. The group also had a 50 cent monthly assessment. This plan was later dropped and the group began to be funded by attorney Richard Kaplan of Gary, Indiana.

== See also ==
- Anti-fascism
- Blue Shirts (disambiguation)
- List of anti-fascists
