= Hugo Sinclair de Rochemont =

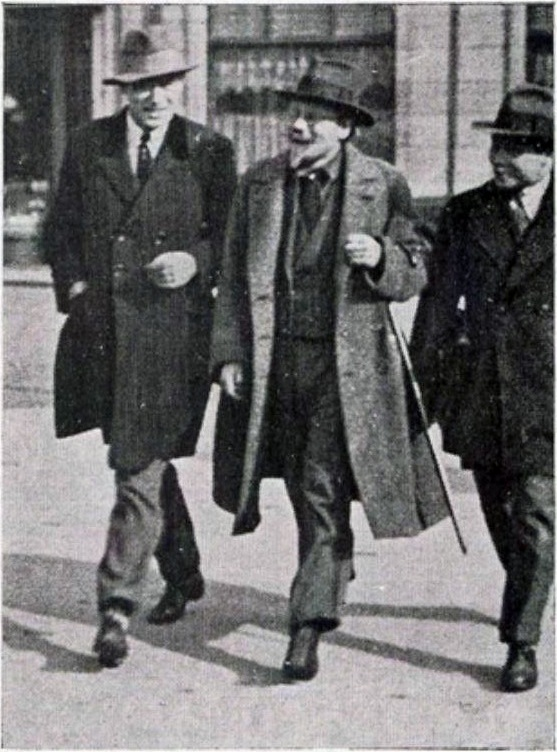
- H.A. Sinclair de Rochemont (right) in 1929
- Born: Hugues Alexandre Sinclair de Rochemont; 6 January 1901; Hilversum, Netherlands
- Died: 13 March 1942 (aged 41); Soviet Union
- Cause of death: Killed in action
- Education: Leiden University
- Occupations: Civil servant, bookseller, Waffen SS soldier
- Employer(s): Dutch government, Schutzstaffel
- Known for: fascist politician and writer
- Political party: Verbond van Actualisten, National Front, National Socialist Dutch Workers Party

Hugues Alexandre Sinclair de Rochemont (6 January 1901 – 13 March 1942) was a Dutch fascist and later a collaborator with the Nazis.

== Biography ==
Whilst studying Indology at Leiden University, de Rochemont became associated with the rightist professor Gerardus Johannes Petrus Josephus Bolland (1854–1922). After leaving the university in 1924, he set up the country's first fascist movement, the Verbond van Actualisten, with Alfred Haighton. This group had stood in the 1925 general election but won only 0.08% of the vote. Alongside this, de Rochemont worked as a journalist for De Vaderlander and as a strike breaker. In 1927, he began editing De Bezem (The Broom), a fascist journal aimed at the working classes and continued to publish under this name after 1930, when he split from Haighton.

Having split from Haighton, de Rochemont became associated with Joris Van Severen of Belgium, although most of his time was given over to his work as a civil servant and then as an antiquarian bookseller. He joined both the National Front and the National Socialist Dutch Workers Party in 1940, having become fully convinced of Nazism, even to the point of accepting the incorporation of the Netherlands into the Third Reich.

After spells in prison for homosexuality and attempting to assassinate Anton Mussert, de Rochemont volunteered for the Dutch legion of the Waffen-SS and was killed on active duty near Grisi in the Soviet Union.
