= List of candidates in the 1933 Dutch general election =

Prior to the 1933 Dutch general election, contesting parties put forward party lists.

== Christian Historical Union ==
Candidate list for the Christian Historical Union
Position	Candidate	Votes	Result
1	Dirk Jan de Geer	321,255	Elected
2	Jan Rudolph Slotemaker de Bruine	4,755	Elected
3	Jouke Bakker	797	Elected
4	Reinhardt Snoeck Henkemans	671	Elected
5	Hermanus Johannes Lovink	460	Elected
6	Hendrik Tilanus	254	Elected
7	Frans Beelaerts van Blokland	587	Elected, but declined
8	Jan Weitkamp	4,078	Elected
9	Carel Wessel Theodorus van Boetzelaer van Dubbeldam	416	Elected
10	Frida Katz	1,761	Elected
11	Jan Krijger	346	Replacement
12	Jan Willem Hendrik Rutgers van Rozenburg	195	Replacement
13	Aat van Rhijn	180	
14	N.G. Veldhoen	268	
15	Tjeerd Krol	217	Replacement
16	Johannes Anthonie de Visser	311	
17	M. Marra	343	
18	D.J. Mellema	98	
19	J.C. Wolthuis	209	
20	J. van der Marel	489	

== General Dutch Fascist League ==
Candidate list for the General Dutch Fascist League (Dutch: Algemeene Nederlandsche Fascisten Bond)
Position	Candidate	Votes	Result
1	Jan Baars	16,617	
2	J.G. van Heijst	114	
3	Th. Riel	55	
4	D. van Dam	67	
5	L. van Zandwijk	34	
6	A.A. Jurgens	58	
7	J. Brugman	43	
8	Th.W. Polet	169	

== National Socialist Party ==
Candidate list for the National Socialist Party (Dutch: Nationaal-Socialistische Partij)
Position	Candidate	Votes	Result
1	Albert de Joode	1,826	
2	A. van Luijn	109	
3	N.P. Hoogerboord	34	
4	F.J.H. van Gelderen	54	
5	E.J. Hartman	32	
6	C. Zuidam	72	

== Orange fascists ==
Candidate list for the Orange fascists
Position	Candidate	Votes	Result
1	J.G.A. van Zijst	252	
2	H.M. Kempenaar	9	

== Source ==
- "Besluit van het Centraal Stembureau bedoeld in artikel 97 der Kieswet". Nederlandsche staatscourant. 6 May 1933 – via Delpher.
