= Blueshirt (socialist) =

Blue tops used by socialists

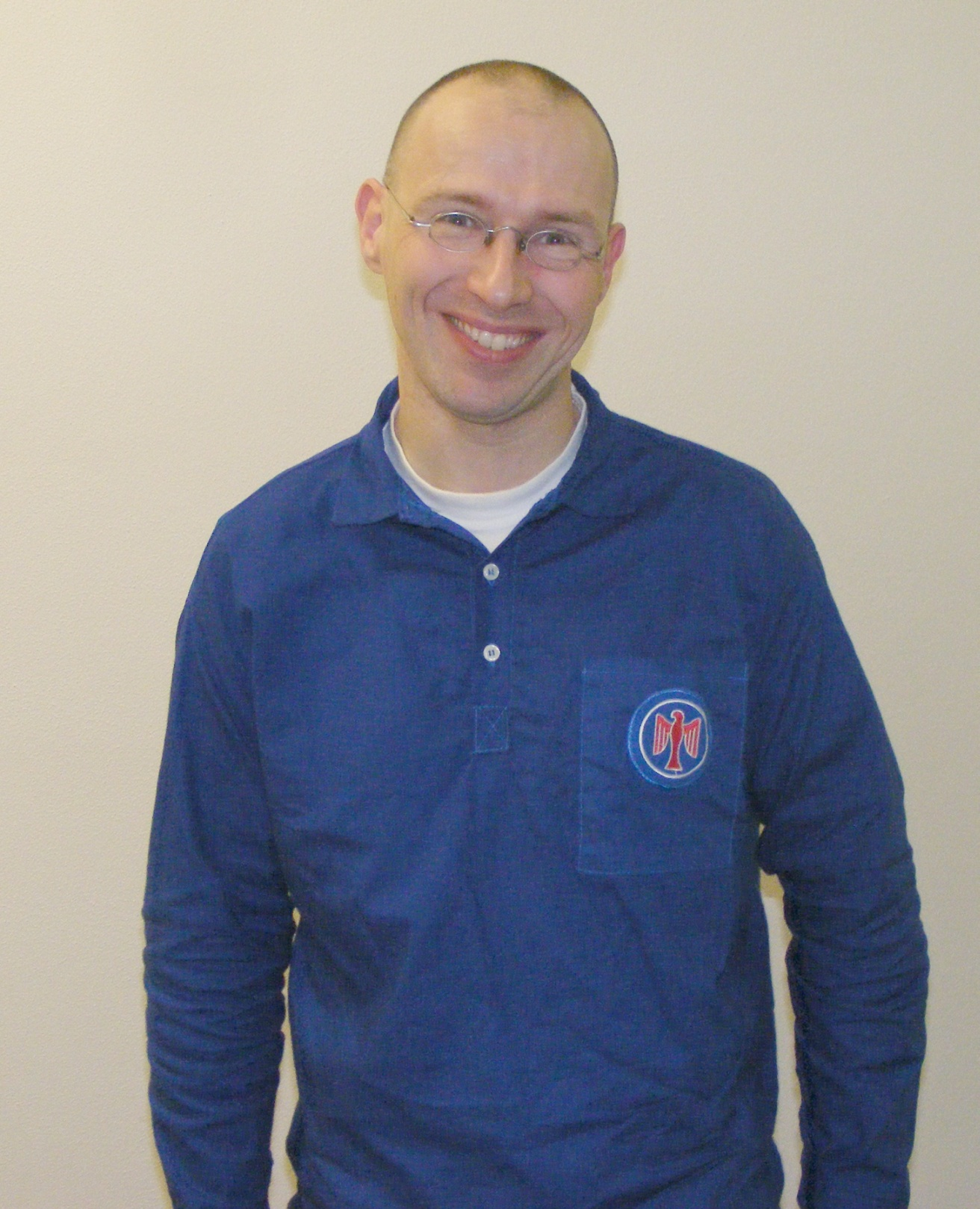
Blueshirt of the Falken

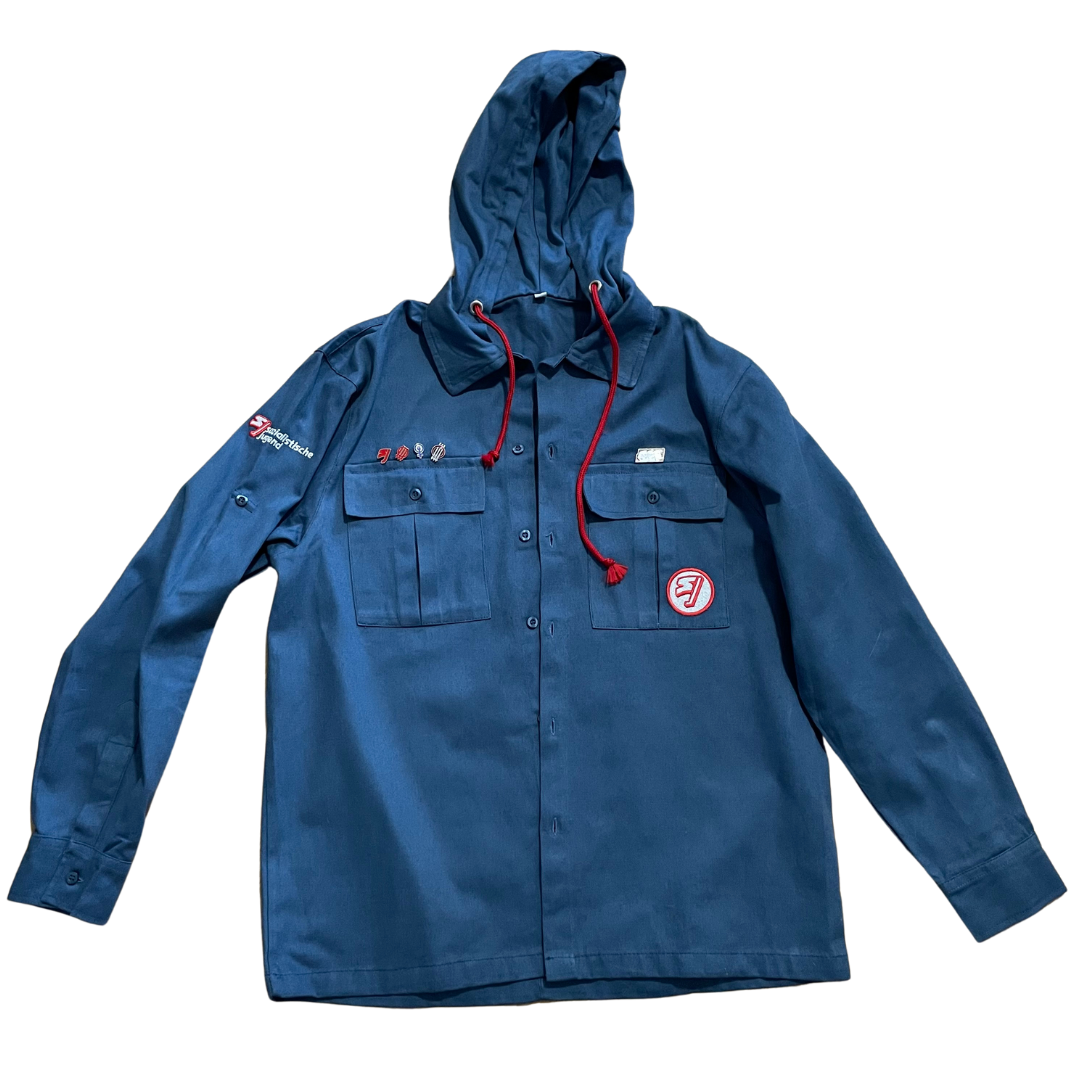
Blueshirt of the Socialist Youth Austria

The Blueshirt, often worn with a red scarf, serves as the traditional attire for members of various youth organizations with roots in the socialist and labor movements. It is the distinctive outfit for members of the German Falcon organization (Socialist Youth of Germany – Falcons), the Austrian Red Falcons (Rote Falken), and the Socialist Youth Austria (SJÖ). The blue shirt symbolizes the connection to the labor movement and "blue collar workers", while the red scarf reflects their affiliation with socialism or social democracy. The tradition of wearing a blue shirt originated with the Red Falcons in 1920s Austria.

The Blueshirt of the East German youth organization FDJ has been worn since 1946. Before reunification, many young members of the Falken rejected the Blueshirt, considering it a symbol of uniformity, especially due to its association with the FDJ Blueshirt. However, some Falken groups emphasize that the Falken Blueshirt is not a uniform. Unlike the FDJ Blueshirt, the Falken Blueshirt does not have shoulder straps. Additionally, the FDJ shirt was worn without a blue or red neckerchief, which was reserved for the Jung- or Thälmann pioneers in East Germany. Before reunification, the FDJ Blueshirt was prohibited in West Germany as a symbol of a banned organization. However, this prohibition did not apply to the Falken Blueshirt. In recent times, the Falken Blueshirt has regained popularity among the Falken members.

- Eppe, Heinrich: Blauhemd – „Freundschaft“ – Roter Falke. In: AJ. Die andere Jugendzeitschrift. (1994), Book 3 (Online).
- Eppe, Heinrich: Kleines Falken ABC, (1997) (Online).
