= Jan Baars =

Dutch politician (born 1903)

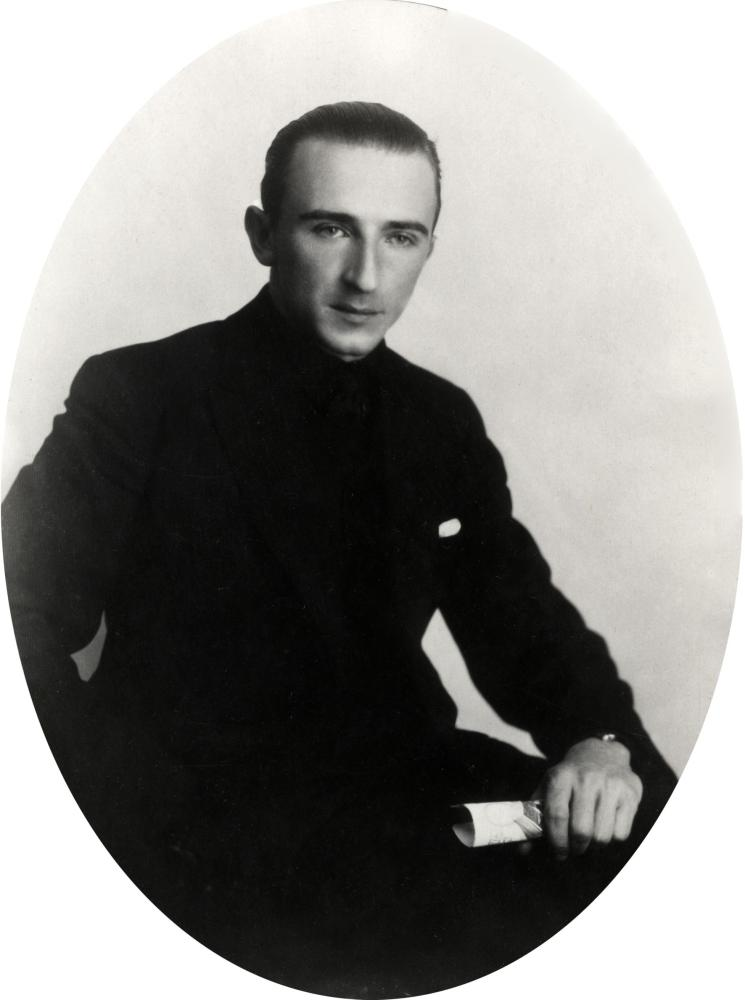
- Jan Baars in 1931
- Born: Joannes Antonius Baars; 30 June 1903; Amsterdam
- Died: 22 April 1989 (aged 85); Andijk
- Citizenship: Dutch
- Occupation: Market trader
- Known for: Politician
- Political party: General Dutch Fascist League

Joannes Antonius Baars (30 June 1903 – 22 April 1989) was a leading Dutch fascist during the 1930s.

During the 1920s Baars emerged as part of the group associated with De Bezem, a fascist journal aimed at the poor. The magazine split in 1930 and Baars supported Alfred Haighton over H.A. Sinclair de Rochemont, joining Haighton's Fascistische Jongeren Bond. The two quarrelled in 1932 however and the rabble-rousing Baars soon set up his own movement, the General Dutch Fascist League (ANFB). The stated purpose of this new group was to unite the various strands of fascism within the Netherlands under a single umbrella.

Baars gained some support amongst the poor as his coarse, down-to-earth style of rhetoric could easily be identified with by people who spoke in the same manner. This group joined Haighton's movement and the National Union in 1933 to form a 'corporative concentration', although Baars, who was a market trader by profession, had little time for Carel Gerretson, the university professor who led the new group. He stood down from the ANFB as a consequence in 1934 and that group soon fell apart. After a brief involvement in opposing Anton Mussert and the NSB, Baars quit politics in 1936 and returned to market trading. Having previously criticized Adolf Hitler's treatment of the Jews, Baars played no role in collaboration and was even active in the Dutch resistance.

== Electoral history ==
Electoral history of Jan Baars
| Year | Body | Party | Pos. | Votes | Result | | Ref. |
| Year | Body | Party | Pos. | Votes | Party seats | Individual | Ref. |
|---|---|---|---|---|---|---|---|
| 1931 | Amsterdam Municipal Council | | | | 0 | Lost | |
| 1933 | House of Representatives | General Dutch Fascist League | 1 | 16,617 | 0 | Lost | |
