= National Union (Netherlands) =

Dutch political party

The National Union (Dutch: Nationale Unie) was a Dutch fascist political party active during the 1920s and 1930s.

The Union was set up in 1925 by Carel Gerretson and Robert Frédéric Groeninx van Zoelen initially as a study group with the intention of arresting the factionalism that was gripping the Dutch far right at the time. The Union set itself the task of improving unity and entered into negotiations with a number of groups, notably the General Dutch Fascist League. Ultimately it came together with this group and the followers of Alfred Haighton to form the 'corporative concentration' in 1933. This however proved short-lived and when it broke down the following year the National Union largely fizzled out.
