= Wouter Lutkie =

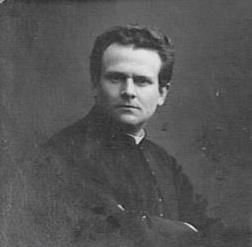
- Lutkie (1919)
- Born: Wouterus Leonardus Lutkie; 23 February 1887 's-Hertogenbosch
- Died: 23 January 1968 (aged 80); Nuland
- Other name: Fascist activist
- Citizenship: Dutch
- Occupation: Priest
- Notable work: Aristo
- Political party: Black Front
- Spouse: Celibate

Wouterus Leonardus Lutkie (23 February 1887 in 's-Hertogenbosch – 23 January 1968 in Nuland) was a Dutch Catholic priest and fascist.

== Biography ==
Lutkie came from a wealthy business family and initially was influenced by the idealism of Ernest Hello and Léon Bloy. He was a fervent Catholic. He was ordained in 1919 and subsequently moved to Nuland where he spent the rest of his life.

Lutkie became drawn to Benito Mussolini and travelled several times to Italy, which increased his zeal. He set up his own magazine Aristo in 1930. This lasted until 1943 before reappearing after the war and continuing until 1965. He conducted a series of interviews with the Italian leader. He would also co-operate with Arnold Meijer and the Black Front. In all however Lutkie sought to weld traditional Christianity to fascism's youthful dynamism and he built up a small group of followers with the publication of Aristo.

Lutkie had little time for Anton Mussert and did not support Nazism. As such he faced no charges after the war, despite an examination, and spent the post-war years in semi-retirement (albeit still publishing Aristo until 1965).

In 2022 his biography was published: Willem Huberts, Soli Deo - Wouter Lutkie (1887-1968). Biografie van een priester-fascist. Amsterdam, Boom, 2022. ISBN 978-90-2444-641-4.
