= Greyshirt (disambiguation) =

Greyshirt or Grayshirt may refer to:

- Greyshirt, a comic book character.
- Greyshirts, a former South African political movement
- Grayshirt (college sports), a college athlete who delays enrollment for a portion of an academic year
- Grey Shirts, a fascist group in 1934 American novel The President Vanishes and film
