= Greenshirts =

Greenshirts or Green shirts can mean:

== Politics ==
- Brazilian Integralist Action, a political party in Brazil
- Green Shirt Movement for Social Credit, a political party in the United Kingdom
- Comités de Défense Paysanne, agrarian militias founded by Henry Dorgères in France
- Greenshirts (National Corporate Party), a fascist political party in Ireland
- Hungarian National Socialist Party, a fascist political party in Hungary
- Iron Guard, a fascist political party and paramilitary force in Romania
- Juventudes de Acción Popular, the youth organization of Popular Action, a political party in Spain
- Lega Nord ("Northern League"), a regionalist political party in Italy
- Young Egypt Party (1933), a nationalist political party in Egypt
- Yugoslav Radical Union, a fascist political party in the Kingdom of Yugoslavia

== Sports ==
- Pakistan national cricket team
- Pakistan men's national field hockey team

== Other ==
- Greenshirts (G.I. Joe), a G.I. Joe character
- GREEN SHIRTS, an eco fashion clothing brand from Germany

== See also ==
- "Green Shirt", a 1979 song by Elvis Costello and the Attractions
