= Oscar van Rappard =

Dutch hurdler and footballer

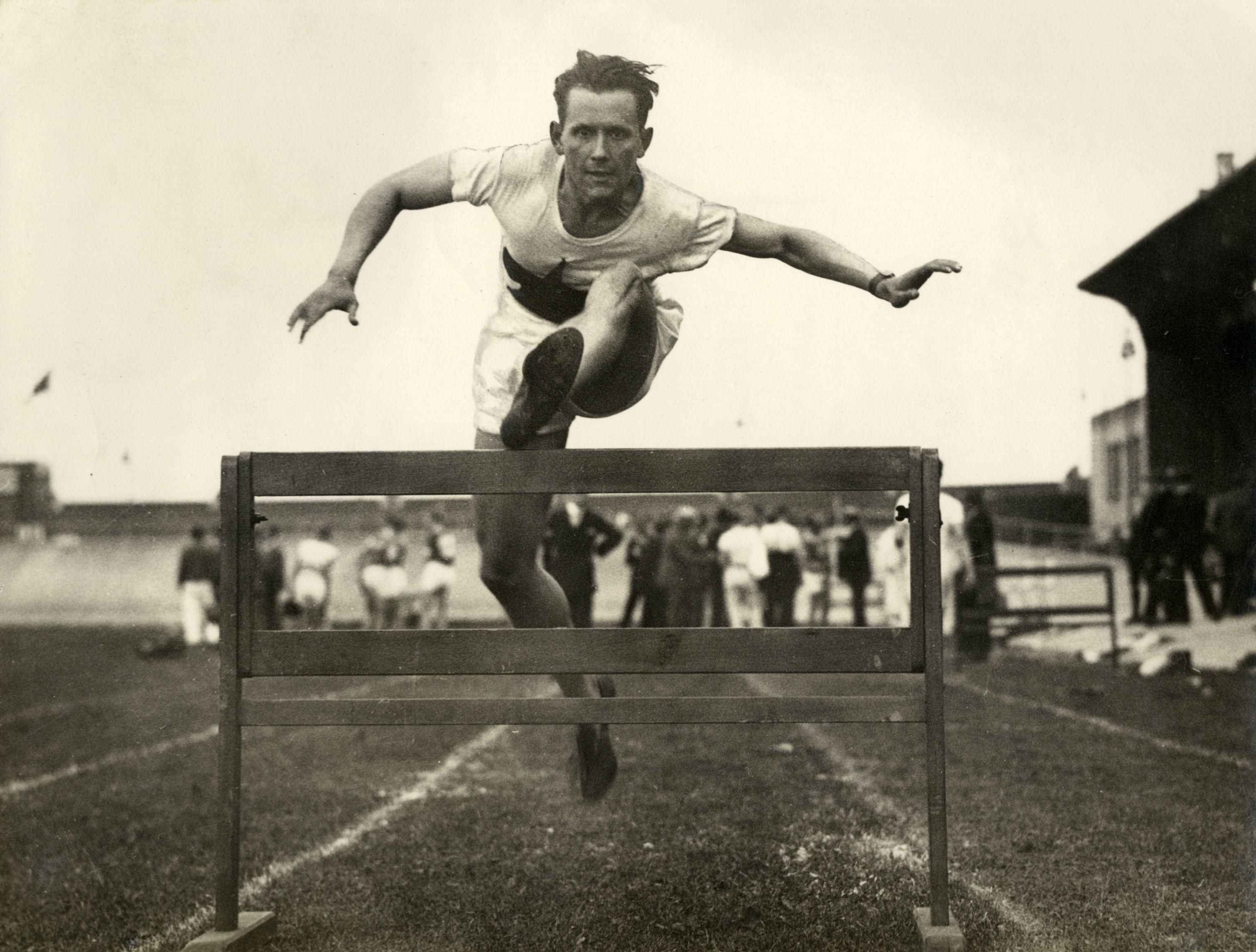

Medal record

Men's Football

Representing Netherlands

Olympic Games
Bronze medal – third place	1920 Antwerp	Team competition

Oscar Emile, Knight van Rappard (2 April 1896 in Probolinggo, Dutch East Indies – 18 April 1962 in The Hague) was a track and field athlete and football (soccer) player from the Netherlands. He was the older brother of Ernst Herman van Rappard. As a forward, he played between 1912 and 1921 for HBS in The Hague. He represented his native country at two consecutive Summer Olympics, starting in 1920.

At his Olympic debut he won the bronze medal with the Netherlands national football team, while at the same tournament he ran the 110 m hurdles, where he was eliminated in the qualifying heats.
