= Blue collar (disambiguation) =

A blue-collar worker is a working-class person who performs manual labor.

Blue collar may also refer to:

- Blue-collar crime, a crime typically associated with the working class
- Blue Collar Comedy Tour, a comedy ensemble consisting of Jeff Foxworthy, Larry the Cable Guy, Bill Engvall and Ron White
  - Blue Collar TV, a comedy show based on the tour.
- Blue Collar (film), a 1978 film written and directed by Paul Schrader
- Blue Collar (album), a 2006 album by rapper Rhymefest
- "Blue Collar" (Bachman-Turner Overdrive song), 1973
- "Blue Collar", a popular rock song from the Prism album, Beat Street
