= Union of Actualists =

Union of Actualists Verbond van Actualisten
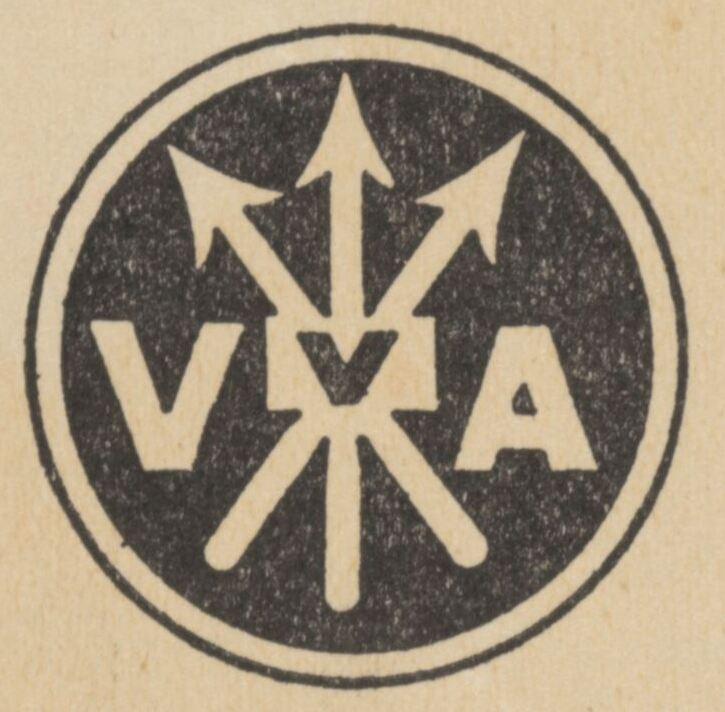
- Chairperson: K.H.E. de Jong (until 1926); H. A. Sinclair de Rochemont
- Secretary: H. A. Sinclair de Rochemont (until 1924); W.H. Snijders (after 1924)
- Founder: H. A. Sinclair de Rochemont; Alfred Haighton; K.H.E. de Jong; Arie van Iperen
- Founded: January 23, 1923
- Dissolved: November 1928
- Ideology: Fascism; Actualism

The Union of Actualists (Dutch: Verbond van Actualisten, VvA) was an actualist and the first fascist political party in the Netherlands. It was founded in January 1923. The party was soon plagued by internal struggles. It failed to get a seat in the 1925 general election, receiving 0.07% of the votes. The internal struggles led to the dissolution of the party in November 1928.

== History ==
Preparations for the Union started in December 1922 by Hugo Sinclair de Rochemont, Alfred Haighton, K.H.E. de Jong and Arie van Iperen. The inaugural meeting took place on 23 January 1923. It was first called Union of National-radicalists (Dutch: Verbond van Nationaal-radicalisten). Parapsychologist De Jong was chairperson and Indology student Sinclair was secretary. Most power however lied with director of Lotisico, Haighton, who funded the party. Other famous members included Emile Verviers (in secret) and Cornelis van Geelkerken.

In its first year it avoided the term 'fascism', mostly voicing opposition to socialism and antimilitarism. Haighton visited Benito Mussolini who had just taken power after the March on Rome, and the relatively unknown Adolf Hitler. In 1924, lieutenant W.H. Snijders replaced Sinclair as secretary, leading to more decisive actions. It made the news when they disturbed an antimilitarist meeting and managed to break a labor strike. In the summer of 1924, the party would merge with the Society for Constructive Politics (Dutch: Genootschap voor Opbouwende Staatkunde), a group of Catholic intellectuals led by Verviers.

The party published its manifesto in November 1924, although it wasn't very clear. Within the party, two factions rose up. A group led by De Jong and Snijders preferred a moderate course, while a group led by Haighton wanted to follow Italian fascism. The struggle mostly halted activities within the party. Its participation led by Jan Schouten in the 1925 general election was not successful, receiving only 2,253 votes (0.07%).

The group led by De Jong left the party in 1926 and joined the ultraconservatist Fatherland League (Dutch: Vaderlandsch Verbond). The VvA existed until 1928, without undertaking notable activities. Sinclair founded the De Bezem (The Broom) in 1928, and a group of VvA members including Haighton followed him.

== See also ==
- List of Union of Actualists candidates in the 1925 Dutch general election
