= Nuland =

- Flag Coat of arms

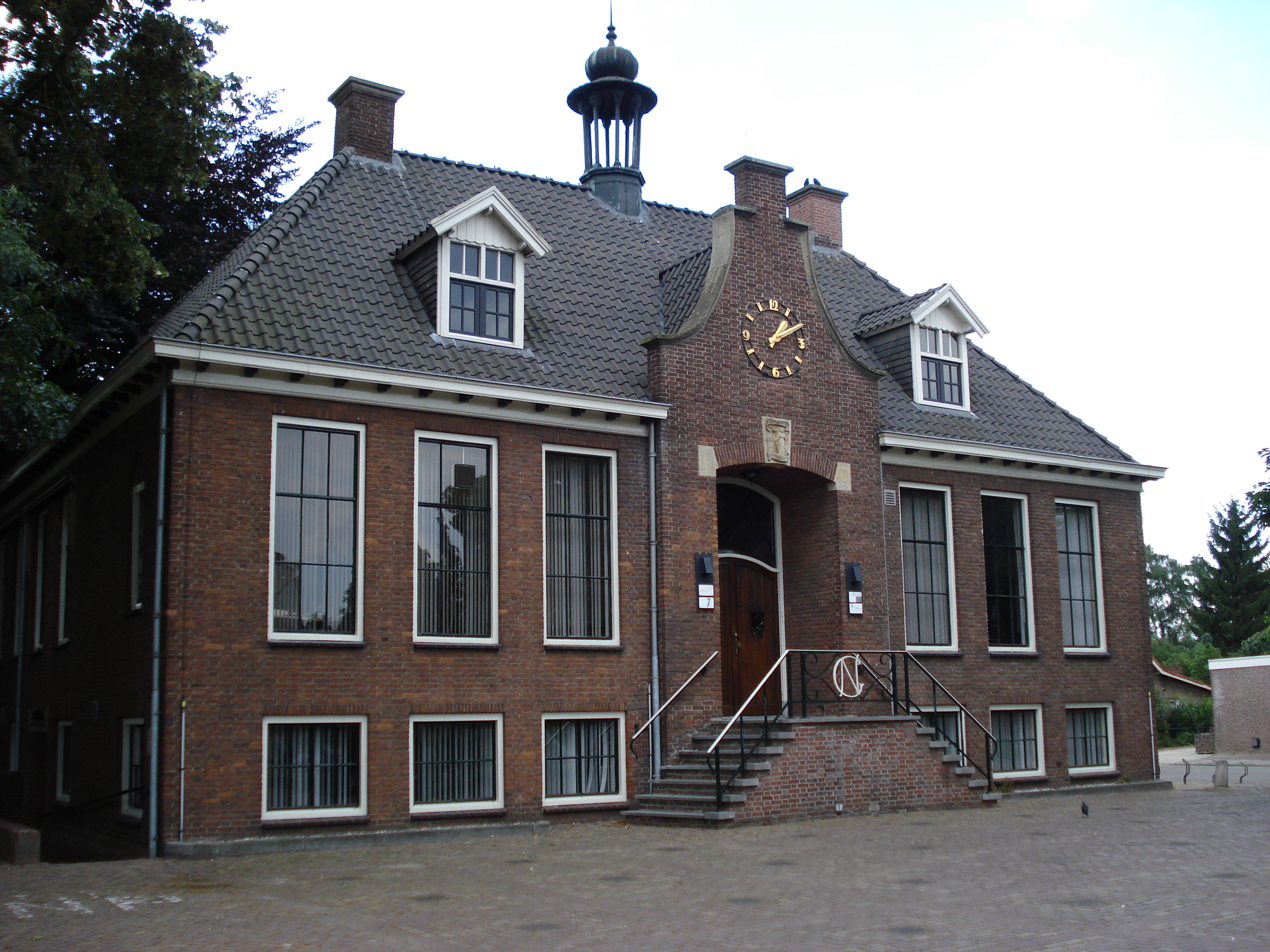
- The former town hall of Nuland

- Location within the Netherlands Location within Europe
- Coordinates: 51°43′37″N 5°26′2″E
- Country: Netherlands
- Province: North Brabant
- Municipality: 's-Hertogenbosch

Population (2022)
  - Total: 4,554

Nuland is a village in the Dutch province of North Brabant. It is located about 8 km (5 mi) east of 's-Hertogenbosch.

== History ==
In the Middle Ages, Nuland was part of the Kwartier van Maasland of the Meierij van 's-Hertogenbosch. The oldest mention of Nuland dates from November 11, 1299, when the inhabitants of Nuland were given land to cultivate (gemeynt) and also obtained municipal rights from John II, Duke of Brabant. Later Nuland became a seigneury with Geffen, which was owned by the Van Vladeracken family during 1505-1638. A castle was built around 1500 by Jan van Vladeracken, immediately north of the bowl, on the Singel. It was a round castle that was destroyed in the French era. A curve in the road, immediately south of the railway, still reminds of this, as does the name of the farm: "Vladeracken".

From 1666-1672 Cornelis Tromp lived in Nuland. He was the son of Maarten Tromp and brother of Joanna Maria Tromp, wife of Cornelis Gans, Lord of Nuland and later Lady of Nuland.

Severe floods occurred regularly, for example in 1876 and 1880.

Nuland suffered greatly during the liberation days. It was shelled first by the Allies and later by the Germans during Operation Market Garden. On October 5, 1944, the church tower was blown up and the village was evacuated on October 9. The inhabitants fled to Geffen, which had already been liberated, and then to Oss. On October 22, 1944, the attack on 's-Hertogenbosch was launched and Nuland was liberated by the 53rd (Welsh) Infantry Division. On October 27, 's-Hertogenbosch also fell into the hands of the Allies.

Nuland was a separate municipality until 1993 when it merged with Geffen and Vinkel to create the new municipality of Maasdonk. This lasted until 2015 when Maasdonk was dissolved, and Nuland became part of 's-Hertogenbosch.

== Sint Jozefoord ==
West of Nuland is a cover sand ridge with heath and drift sand remnants and coniferous forests. There used to be a small castle here, called Duyn en Dael. In 1948 the Sisters of the Choorstraat acquired this Duyn en Dael area. They obtained this site for free from the owner Wouter Lutkie. In exchange for this gift, the Congregation promised to pay a sum of money to Lutkie every year and to take care of him, together with his friends, the couple Kees Ras and Marie-Ras-van den Eerenbeemt for the rest of their lives, which they did. In 1951 the construction of a monastery with the name Sint Jozefoord started. This was opened in 1952. It was a place of care for elderly religious of this congregation. The architect of this monastery was Jos Schijvens. When the number of sisters declined, women religious from other congregations were also taken in. In 2008, the care institution was also opened to non-religious people and in 2002 there were 115 sisters and 20 non-religious people living there. In 2020, 144 residents live there, 41 of whom are sisters from 12 congregations. The monastery also has a beautiful Monastery Garden.

North of Nuland lies the former Maasdijk and to the north of it the Beerse Maas first flowed. This is now low-lying polder land. To the south of Nuland is a low-lying reclamation area called Het Broek, and to the east is agricultural land and the basin of Geffen.

== Famous Nulanders ==
- Cornelis Tromp, was a naval officer who served as lieutenant-admiral general in the Dutch Navy,
- Wouter Lutkie, Catholic priest and fascist.
- Koen van der Biezen is a professional footballer.
- Lambert van Nistelrooij is a politician who served as a Member of the European Parliament.
- Elle van den Bogaart Young adult novelist

== Gallery ==
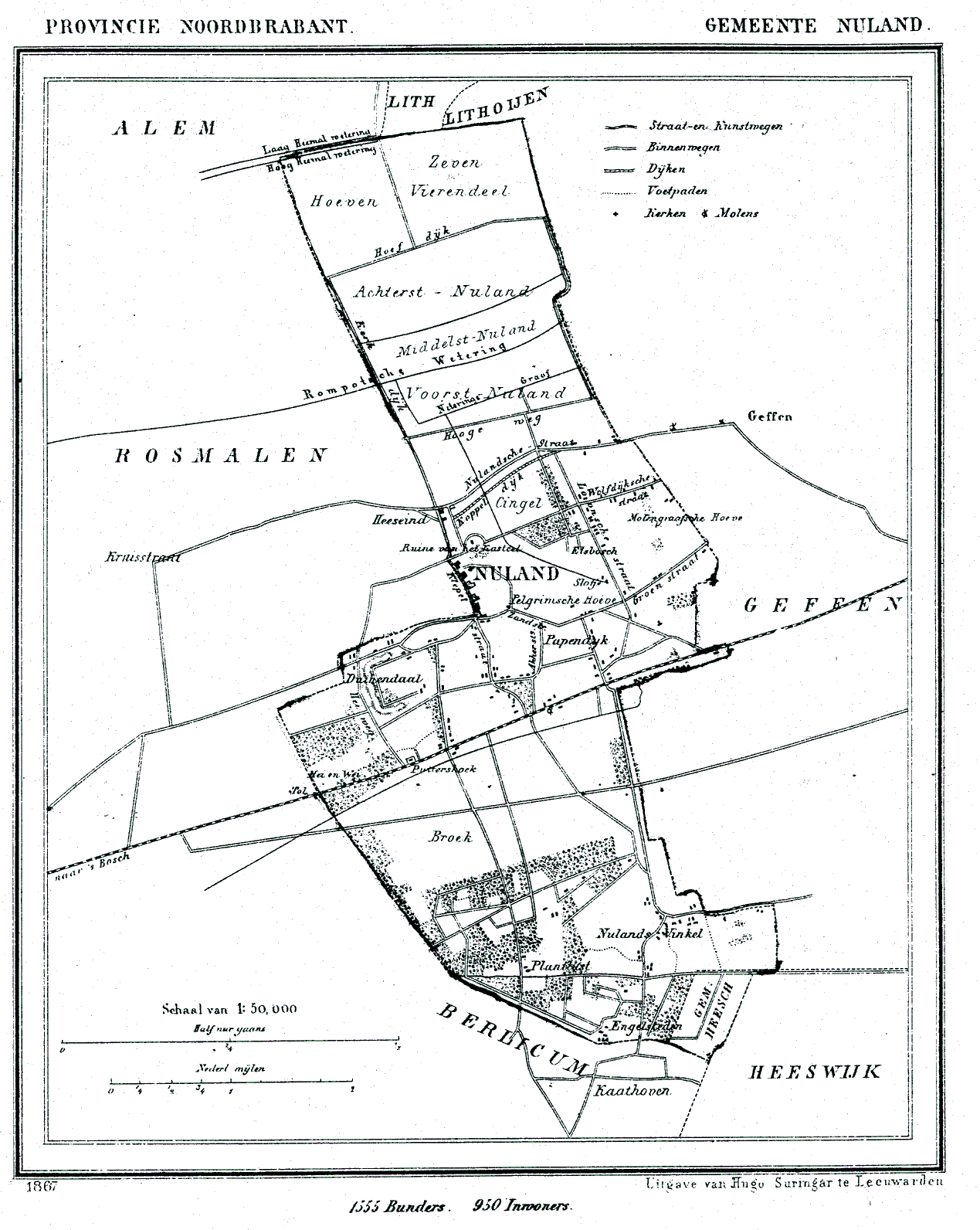
Map of Nuland in 1867

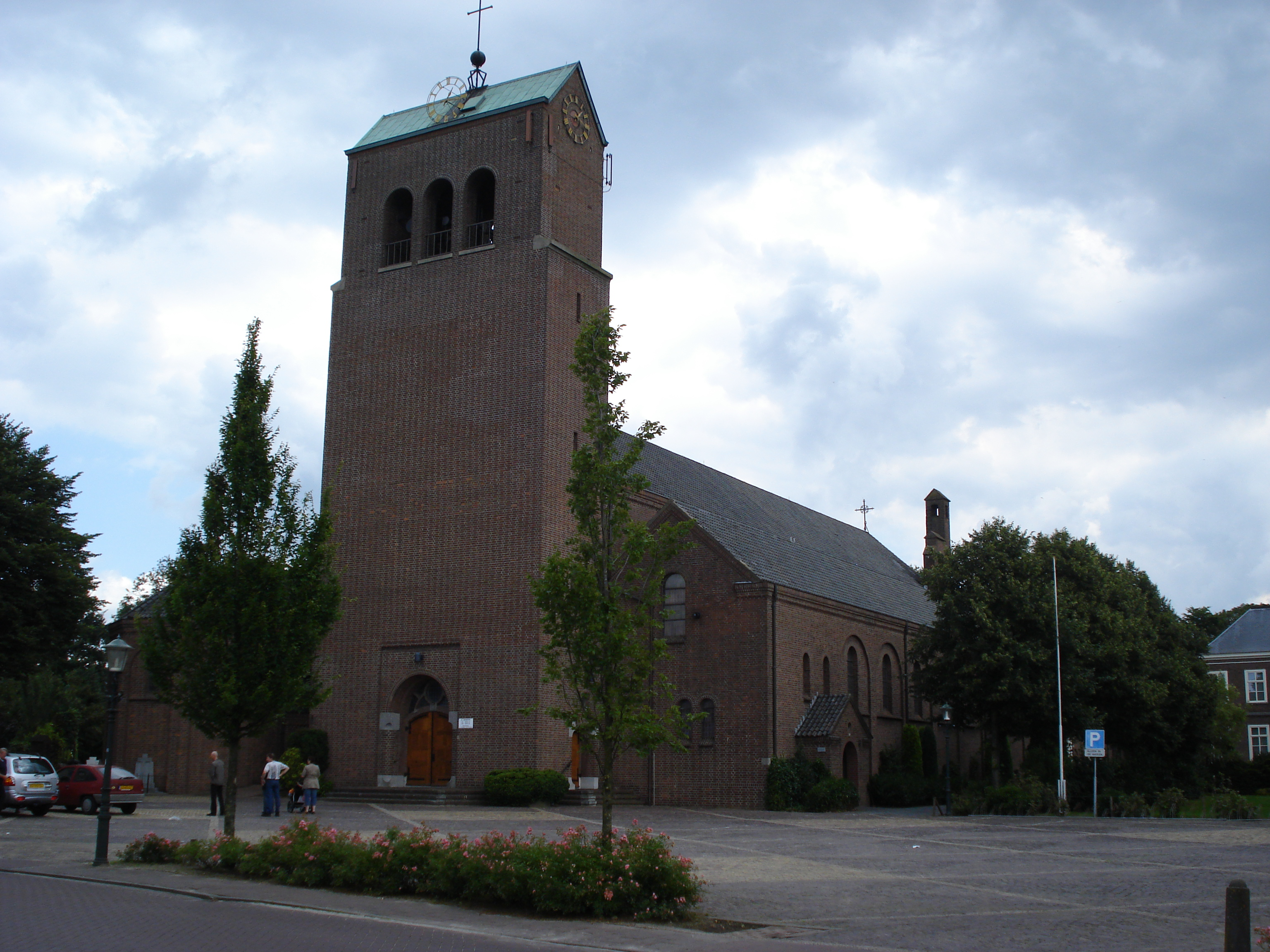
Sint-Jan's-Onthoofdingskerk

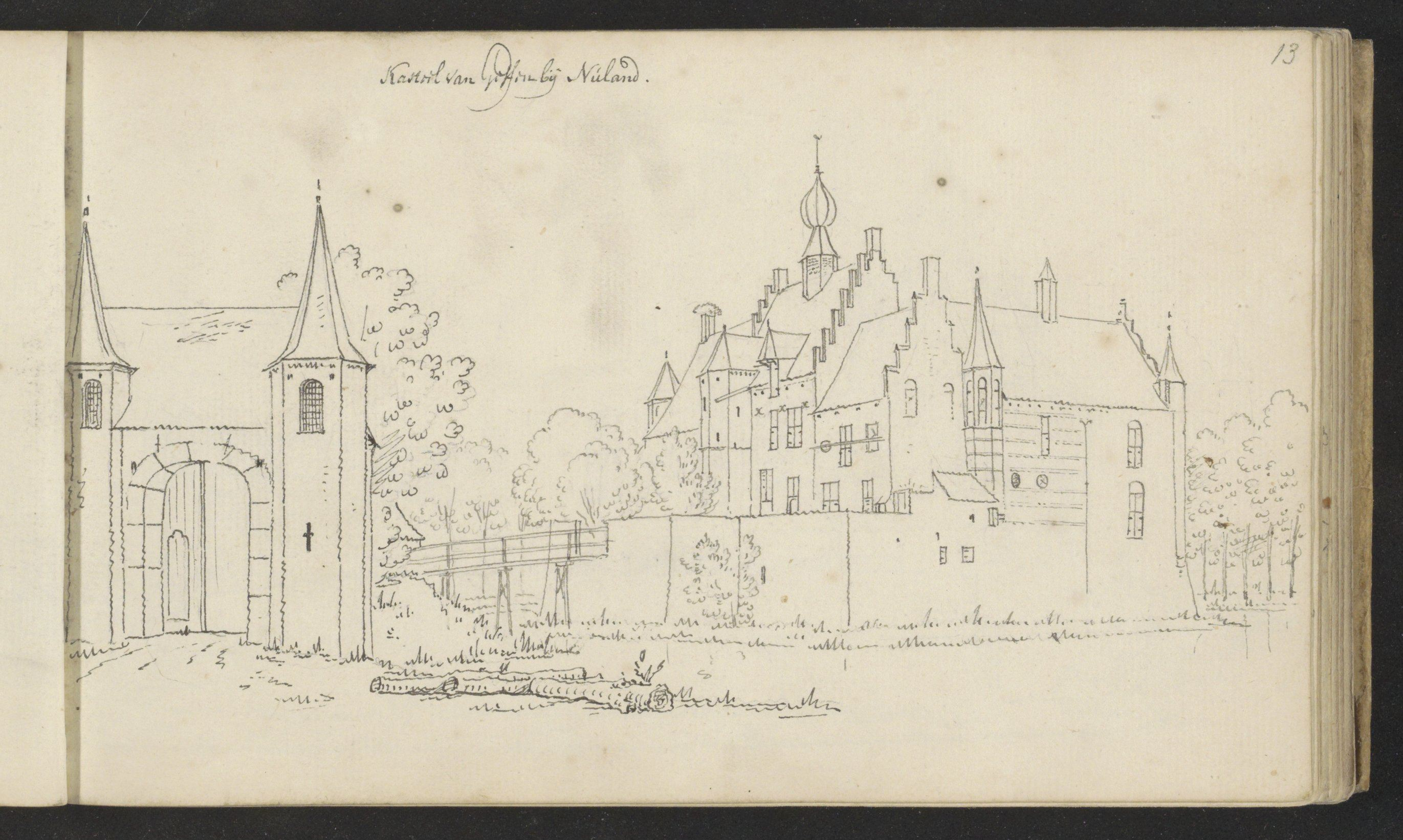
Castle van Geffen

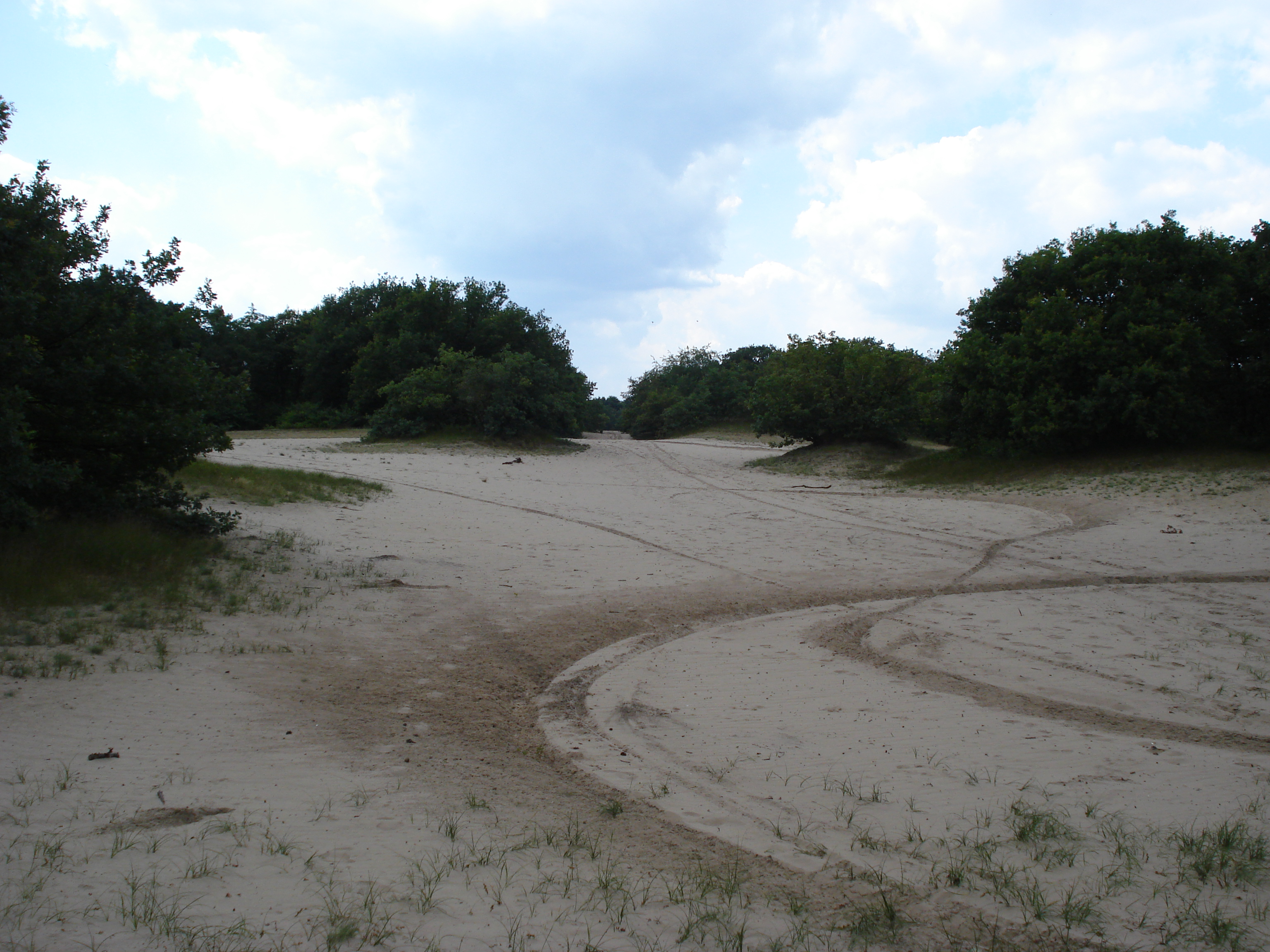
Nulandse Heide

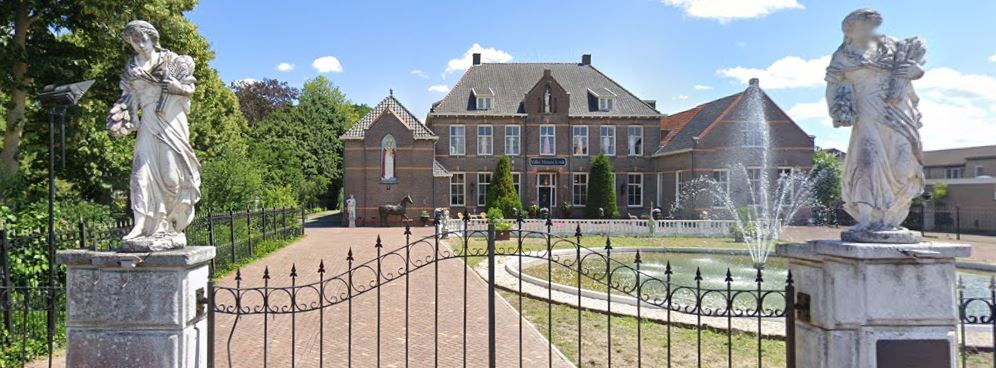
Villa Maasdonk, Former monastery Martinushuis
