= Blackshirts (India) =

Anti-religious organization in India

Blackshirts are members of the anti-religious, atheist quasi-political organization Dravidar Kazhagam in Tamil Nadu, founded by "Periyar" E V Ramasamy. Periyar was an anti-casteism activist, who showed his anger at the British for leaving India without solving casteism first, using black flags and shirts as symbols of his movement. Periyar wanted to uproot caste sentiments and superstitions prevalent in Tamil society. He chose the black shirt as the symbol of the Dravidian movement. This has its origins in the banning of black flags as a protest tool in Tamil Nadu. To circumvent this ban, members wore black shirts. Black shirts and black flags were also seen as a symbol of anarchy in southern India especially in Tamil Nadu during the early 20th century.
