= Fatherland League (Netherlands) =

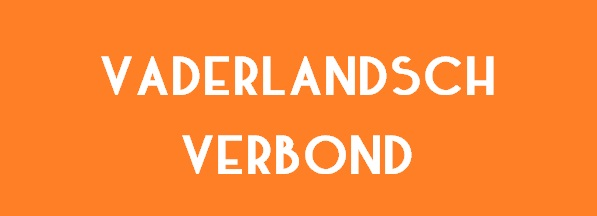

The Fatherland League (Dutch: Vaderlandsch Verbond, VV) was a Dutch conservative liberal political party founded in 1924, which became (pseudo-)fascist The Fatherland League (Dutch: Het Vaderlandsch Verbond, HVV) in 1926. It had no electoral success and merged with the New Union of Nationalists (Dutch: Nieuw Verbond van Nationalisten) in 1932.

== History ==
The party was founded on 15 November 1924, initiated by R.A. Fockema and J.A.A.H. de Beaufort. Among the founding members were members of other liberal parties, including the League of Free Liberals, the Liberal Union, Economic League, Staatspartij voor de Volkswelvaart and Liberal Party (including Samuel van Houten). The party opposed the introduction of universal suffrage and proportional representation, as well as the rise of Christian and socialist parties. Instead, it favored an electoral system focused on persons.

Former member of the House of Representatives Maarten Iman Willem Jacob Bijleveld for the Liberal Union was lead candidate in the 1925 Dutch election. With only 12,597 votes (0.4%), the party failed to acquire a seat. The disappointing results led to an exodus of members. The League started negotiations with the fascist Union of Actualists (VvA) to explore a merge. This led to more members leaving the party, including Van Houten.

On 12 June 1926, the party would be reinstituted as The Fatherland League, when the last remaining members of the Fatherland League merged with a faction of VvA around K.H.E. De Jong. The new party turned against democracy altogether, the party favored limiting the legislative competency of parliaments, the freedom of the press, the right of association and the right of assembly. The new party was led by De Jong, Simon Maas and J.G. Schürmann.

Soon after, the party collapsed because of internal conflicts. In 1927, the party barely had any members. De Jong continued leading the party, without any significant activities. In 1932, the remainder of the party merged with the New Union of Nationalists (Dutch: Nieuw Verbond van Nationalisten).

== Sources ==
- te Slaa, Robin; Klijn, Edwin (2021) [First edition 2009]. De NSB: Ontstaan en opkomst van de Nationaal-Socialistische Beweging, 1931-1935 (in Dutch) (3 ed.). Boom. ISBN 978-90-244-4303-1.
