= Ernst Herman van Rappard =

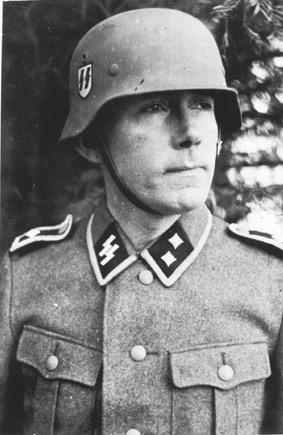
Van Rappard (1944-'45)

Ernst Herman Ridder van Rappard (30 October 1899 – 11 January 1953) was a Dutch Nazi and anti-Semite. After leading his own failed Nazi movement van Rappard enlisted in the Schutzstaffel and saw active service in the Second World War.

== Early years ==
Part of a leading Dutch family, van Rappard was born in Banyumas Regency, Central Java, Dutch East Indies, to chief engineer Oscar Emile ridder van Rappard and his wife Dina Thal Larsenhe, as the younger brother of future sportsman Oscar van Rappard. His schooling took place in the Netherlands at The Hague and subsequently at the University of Leiden. He then studied economics in Berlin and Munich and there became supportive of Nazism.

== Nazi politics ==
He joined the National Socialist Dutch Workers Party (NSNAP) in 1931, although the group split into three and van Rappard soon found himself as the leader of his own version of the party. His group, the NSNAP-Van Rappard advocated the incorporation of the Netherlands into the Third Reich, arguing that the Dutch had a strong ethnic kinship with the Germans. His group also vied with the National Socialist Movement in the Netherlands (NSB) in terms of its virulent anti-Semitism, drawing most of its support from the Dutch-German border. His group was later renamed NSNAP-Hitlerbeweging, though Adolf Hitler ordered the removal of his name from what was a minor movement.

His movement petered out until the 1940 German invasion when it was revived, although it was dissolved in 1941 along with all political parties apart from the NSB. The Nazi occupiers in fact ordered van Rappard to incorporate his group into the NSB.

== War service ==
Following this van Rappard enlisted in the Waffen-SS. As part of the 1st SS Division Leibstandarte SS Adolf Hitler he saw service in Yugoslavia and Greece, albeit without any involvement in actual fighting. He returned to the Netherlands but after refusing to join the NSB he re-enlisted in the 5th SS Panzer Division Wiking. This time he saw action and was wounded on campaign in the Caucasus. He saw out the war as an officer in various units of the Waffen SS, being wounded in Estonia in August 1944 and receiving the Iron Cross Second Class.

== Later years ==
Van Rappard was captured by Canadian soldiers in May 1945 and taken into custody, initially in Utrecht and then in Scheveningen. His service for Germany resulted in him being sentenced to death in 1949, albeit this was later changed to life imprisonment. He was variously imprisoned in Leeuwarden and Breda before dying of a brain haemorrhage in the central prison hospital in Vught.
