= General Dutch Fascist League =

Dutch political party

General Dutch Fascist League Algemeene Nederlandsche Fascisten Bond
- Leader: Jan Baars
- Founder: Jan Baars, Robert Groeninx van Zoelen, Wouter Lutkie
- Founded: 29 June 1932
- Dissolved: 10 May 1934
- Membership (1933): 3,500 to 4,000
- Ideology: Fascism
- Political position: Far-right
- Colors: Black

Party flag

The General Dutch Fascist League (Dutch: Algemeene Nederlandsche Fascisten Bond, ANFB) was a Dutch fascist party. It was founded on 29 June 1932 and dissolved in 1934. The leader of ANFB was Jan Baars, a merchant from Amsterdam.

== History ==
ANFB won 17,157 votes in the general elections of 1933, 0.46% of the total. This was insufficient for a seat in parliament.

ANFB then entered into a 'corporative concentration' with the followers of Alfred Haighton and the National Union. Jan Baars did not get on with Carel Gerretson (the leader of National Union), therefore Baars quit ANFB. Consequently, ANFB floundered without its leader and disappeared.

== Branches ==
Albert Levy Themans led the Amsterdam branch of the General Dutch Fascist League. Levy Themans was criticized by Jewish supporters of the Social Democratic Workers' Party for his limited political knowledge. As Levy Themans pointed out, the General Dutch Fascist League was not antisemitic. Jan Baars later joined the resistance against the Nazi occupation of the Netherlands.

== See also ==
- List of General Dutch Fascist League candidates in the 1933 Dutch general election
