= Black Front (Netherlands) =

Dutch fascist movement active before the Second World War

Black Front / National Front Zwart Front / Nationaal Front
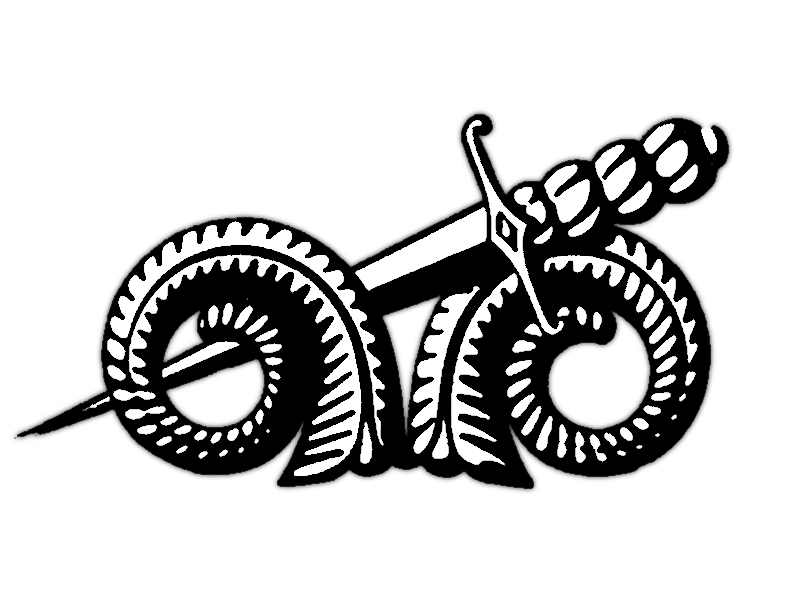
- Leader: Arnold Meijer
- Founded: May 1934
- Dissolved: December 1941
- Split from: General Dutch Fascist League
- Headquarters: Oisterwijk (Black Front), The Hague (National Front)
- Newspaper: Zwart Front; De Weg; Nederlandsch Dagblad
- Ideology: Fascism; Greater Netherlands
- Colors: Black

The Black Front (Dutch: Zwart Front), later known as the National Front (Nationaal Front) was a Dutch irredentist and fascist movement active before and during the first years of the Second World War.

== Party history ==
The Black Front grew out of the southern section of the General Dutch Fascist League, with regional organiser Arnold Meijer quarrelling with leader Jan Baars and leading his followers out in 1934. The Black Front emerged and soon took over a number of smaller movements, while also gaining some support among the poorer parts of society. Although similar to its parent movement, the Black Front emphasised a more Catholic line in tune with Meijer's own religious beliefs. Taking its cue in part from Italian fascism, it adopted that movement's black-shirted uniform while adding a unique emblem featuring a sword between a pair of ram horns.

As a revolutionary fascist party, the small organisation was fiercely anti-capitalist and often came into contact with the justice system. Meijer was convicted multiple times of ignoring the ban on political uniforms and insulting government officials, including Prime Minister Colijn. In 1938, the Black Front leader spent three months in the prison of Breda for insulting Prime Minister Colijn and Minister Van Schaik. The party also had a paramilitary wing named the Black Storm (Zwarte Storm).

The group struggled to gain support from the National Socialist Movement in the Netherlands (NSB); it was renamed the National Front in 1940. The National Front was ultimately banned by Nazi Germany on 14 December 1941, along with all other Dutch political parties except for the NSB. The majority of its members switched to the NSB, although Meijer, disillusioned, left politics altogether.

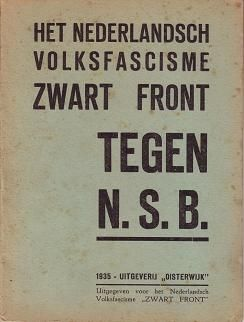
Het Nederlandsch Volksfascisme Zwart Front tegen NSB

== Members ==
- Arnold Meijer, party leader;
- Eugène van Wessem, Greater Netherlands ideologue and victim of Nazi persecution;
- Gustav Adolf Larsen, fascist ideologue;
- Jan Derk Domela Nieuwenhuis Nyegaard, Reformed minister and former member of the Council of Flanders.

== See also ==
- Black Front
- Netherlands in World War II
