= National Socialist Dutch Workers Party =

National Socialist Dutch Workers Party Nationaal-Socialistische Nederlandsche Arbeiderspartij
- Leader: Ernst Herman van Rappard
- Founded: 1931
- Banned: December 14, 1941
- Merged into: National Socialist Movement in the Netherlands
- Headquarters: Amsterdam, Netherlands
- Newspaper: Het Nieuwe Volk
- Youth wing: Nederlandsche Hiterjeud
- Paramilitary wing: Storm Afdeling
- Ideology: Nazism
- Political position: Far-right
- Colors: Red, blue & white

Party flag

The National Socialist Dutch Workers Party (Dutch: Nationaal-Socialistische Nederlandsche Arbeiderspartij [nɑ(t)ɕoːˌnaːlsoːɕaːˈlɪstisə ˈneːdərlɑntsə ˈʔɑrbɛidərspɑrˌtɛi]) or NSNAP (Dutch pronunciation: [ˌɛnɛsɛnaːˈpeː]) was a minor Dutch Nazi party founded in 1931 and led by Ernst Herman van Rappard. Seeking to copy the fascism of others, notably Adolf Hitler, the group failed to achieve success and was accused by rivals such as the National Socialist Movement in the Netherlands (NSB) and the General Dutch Fascist League of being too moderate for a fascist movement. The group looked to the Nazi Party for its inspiration, setting up its own Storm Trooper battalion in imitation of the Sturmabteilung and its own Holland Youth like the Hitler Youth, as well as copying the black swastika in a white circle on a red background as its emblem. Unlike its far-right counterparts, who claimed to endorse Dutch patriotism, the NSNAP sought full incorporation of the Netherlands into the Third Reich, a policy which won it little support as the 998 votes which the party captured in the 1937 election demonstrated. Unlike the NSB, the NSNAP focused on antisemitism, and denounced the NSB as a Jewish-dominated, pseudo-National Socialist organisation.

Van Rappard was unable to hold the party together and before long three separate group were claiming the NSNAP name, one under Major Cornelis Jacobus Aart Kruyt and the other under Albert van Waterland (who had dropped his real surname of de Joode as it meant 'the Jew'). This factionalism in what was already a small party ensured that Alfred Rosenberg, who had considered the possibility of supporting the group with German money, lost interest and so the three NSNAPs faded from significance.

The NSNAP did not gain from the German invasion of 1940 as the German authorities chose Anton Mussert of the rival NSB as their main beneficiary and Major Kruyt's version of the party merged into Mussert's movement in late 1940. The NSNAP finally disappeared altogether on December 14, 1941, when Arthur Seyss-Inquart banned all parties except the NSB. With van Rappard on active service with the Waffen-SS most of the remaining NSNAP members accepted the decision and switched their support to Mussert.

== Electoral performance ==
Election	Lead candidate	List	Votes	%	Seats	+/–	Government	Ref.
1937		List	998	0.0	0 / 100	▲		
