= Solingen attack =

Attack in Solingen may refer to:

- 1993 Solingen arson attack, a racist arson attack
- 2024 Solingen arson attack, an arson attack with disputed motive
- 2024 Solingen stabbing, an Islamic State-associated mass stabbing
