= Florentine Rost van Tonningen =

Wife of Meinoud Marinus Rost van Tonningen (1914-2007)

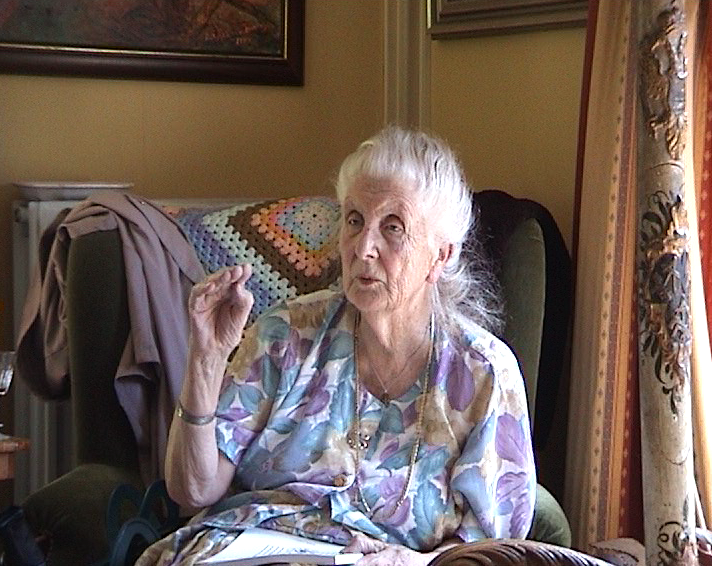
- Rost van Tonningen-Heubel in 2003
- Born: Florentine Sophie Heubel; 14 November 1914; Amsterdam, Netherlands
- Died: 24 March 2007 (aged 92); Waasmunster, Belgium
- Resting place: Rheden, Netherlands
- Education: Utrecht University
- Known for: Nazi collaborator
- Spouse: Meinoud Rost van Tonningen (m. 1940; died 1945)
- Children: 3 sons
- Parents: Gustav Adolph Heubel (father); Cornelie van Haren Noman (mother)

Florentine Sophie Rost van Tonningen (née Heubel; 14 November 1914 – 24 March 2007) was the wife of Meinoud Marinus Rost von Tonningen, the second leader of the National Socialist Movement in the Netherlands (NSB) and President of the National Bank during the German occupation (1941–1945). Because she continued to support and propagate the ideals of Nazism after World War II and the death of her husband, she became known in the Netherlands as the "Black Widow".

== Biography ==
=== Youth ===
Florentine Heubel was the youngest daughter of Gustav Adolph Heubel, banker at the firm Jan Kol & Co. and the aristocrat Cornelie van Haren Noman. There were three more children in the family, daughter Annie (born in 1906) and sons Dolf (1904) and Wim (1910). Florentine Heubel grew up in Hilversum, where the family stood in high regard. When the young Princess Juliana paid a visit to Hilversum, Wim and Florentine were asked to play a game of tennis with the princess. In the 1930s, Florentine and Wim Heubel became active in the Nationale Jeugdstorm, the youth organisation of the NSB modelled on the Hitlerjugend. She studied biology at the University of Utrecht, showing a special interest in ethology.

In connection with her studies, Heubel stayed for some time in Berlin during the summer of 1936. She was impressed by Adolf Hitler and the "camaraderie, discipline and commitment" of the Nazi movement. A year later she made a trip with Wim to the Dutch East Indies, where her eldest brother Dolf worked as agricultural engineer. When she came back to the Netherlands, she left the NSB because she thought that the party was not adhering closely enough to eugenics ideals and that party leader Anton Mussert did not share her concerns. In 1939, her brother introduced her to Meinoud Rost van Tonningen, who already was an important and influential man in the NSB. During the German invasion of the Netherlands on 10 May 1940, Heubel was in Berlin.

=== Marriage ===
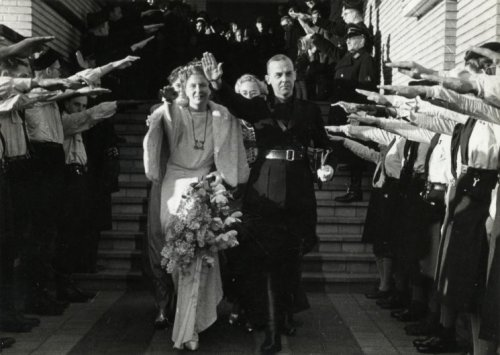
Marriage of Meinoud and Florentine Rost van Tonningen on 21 December 1940.

On 21 December 1940, the day of the Winter Solstice, Heubel married Meinoud Rost van Tonningen.

Upon request, Heinrich Himmler, the German SS-Reichsführer, had approved their genealogy, following which their wedding became the first SS marriage. The Rost van Tonningen family had three sons with the names Grimbert (1941), Ebbe (1943), and Herre (1945). Her children openly distanced themselves from their mother's political views in the 1980s.

The youngest son was born on 28 April 1945 in Terschelling on the day her brother Wim Heubel fell in battle fighting with SS forces near Elst. She soon fled via Cuxhaven to Goslar in Germany, where her parents, who owned local property, were also staying. Her husband Meinoud was captured and imprisoned on 8 May by Canadian troops.

Immediately after the war, Meinoud Rost van Tonningen died in the Scheveningen prison while awaiting trial. He allegedly jumped over the balustrade of a staircase. Rost van Tonningen-Heubel always contended that her husband had been murdered and that this was supported by testimony from fellow prisoners. The motive would have been that her husband, as President of De Nederlandsche Bank, knew too much about illegal money transactions by prominent people. The former RIOD (National Institute of War Documentation) employee, A. J. van der Leeuw, supported her version during the television show Het zwarte schaap (The Black Sheep) and suggested that her husband may have been driven to commit suicide in prison.

In her book, In Search Of My Wedding Ring, Rost van Tonningen-Heubel accused Prince Bernhard of bearing the main responsibility for her husband's death, as he had been head of the Domestic Forces, claiming that her private archive contained evidence of this. Her enormous archive has been donated to the NIOD by her private secretary and archivist, F. J. A. M. van der Helm, who assisted her from 1980 by storing and managing the archive.

=== Post-war period ===
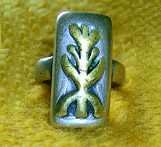
The massive golden wedding ring with the life tree as symbol which Rost van Tonningen wore for 67 years. At her wedding this ring was kissed by Adolf Hitler. Since then she treated it as a "holy relic".

After the death of her husband, Rost van Tonningen-Heubel remained active in several far-right movements. Initially, she was placed under state supervision, like many former Nazis. Her supervisor, Clerk of the Senate Anton Leo de Block, put her three sons under the guardianship of her brother-in-law Nico Rost van Tonningen, who was in the service of Queen Juliana. Her son Grimbert later left his mother and moved in with the Fentener van Vlissingen family.

She denied the Holocaust.

In 1952, she moved from the Hague to Villa "Ben Trovato" in Velp. She considered the villa's name a sign "from above", as "rovato" would correspond to ROst VAn TOnningen. By now she had a private company making heating equipment. In 1968, she appeared in a documentary portrait of Anton Adriaan Mussert by director Paul Verhoeven, the first time she made a nationwide public appearance. Several times she was convicted of distributing Nazi literature and organizing Nazi meetings. The widow's home was repeatedly searched by the police, always without result, and was more than once targeted by arsonists. "House searches, broken windows and arson often took place", she writes in her book, In Search Of My Wedding Ring.

She maintained lifelong contacts with many prominent ex-Nazis and Nazi sympathizers, such as the French professor Robert Faurisson; David Irving; Artur Axmann; Gudrun Himmler (daughter of Heinrich Himmler); Ilse Pröhl (widow of Rudolf Hess); Gertrud and Arthur Seyss-Inquart; Erich Priebke; Miguel Serrano; Matt Koehl, commander of The New Order; Thies Christophersen; Léon Degrelle; Princess Marie Adelheid of Lippe-Biesterfeld; Paula Hitler; Richard Edmonds; Hanns Albin Rauter; Franz von Papen; Hjalmar Schacht; Ernst Zündel; General Otto Ernst Remer; Manfred Roeder; Colin Jordan; Udo Walendy; Horst Mahler; Alfred Vierling; members of the Vlaams Blok; and many others.

Until her death in 2007, Rost van Tonningen-Heubel received a modest widow's pension from the Dutch state, as her husband had once been a member of parliament. This caused much commotion when it became known in 1986. After a hearing in the Lower House, she retained this pension. In 2000, the "Black Widow" appeared in the VARA television program The Black Sheep. In her interview, the 85-year-old widow defended herself so fiercely that VARA considered dropping the broadcast. She planned to move from her villa to an apartment in nearby Arnhem, but legal objections prevented her from doing so. Shortly afterwards, she sought asylum in Belgium, claiming that her life had become impossible in the Netherlands. Until her death, she defended the ideas of Nazism.

=== Death ===
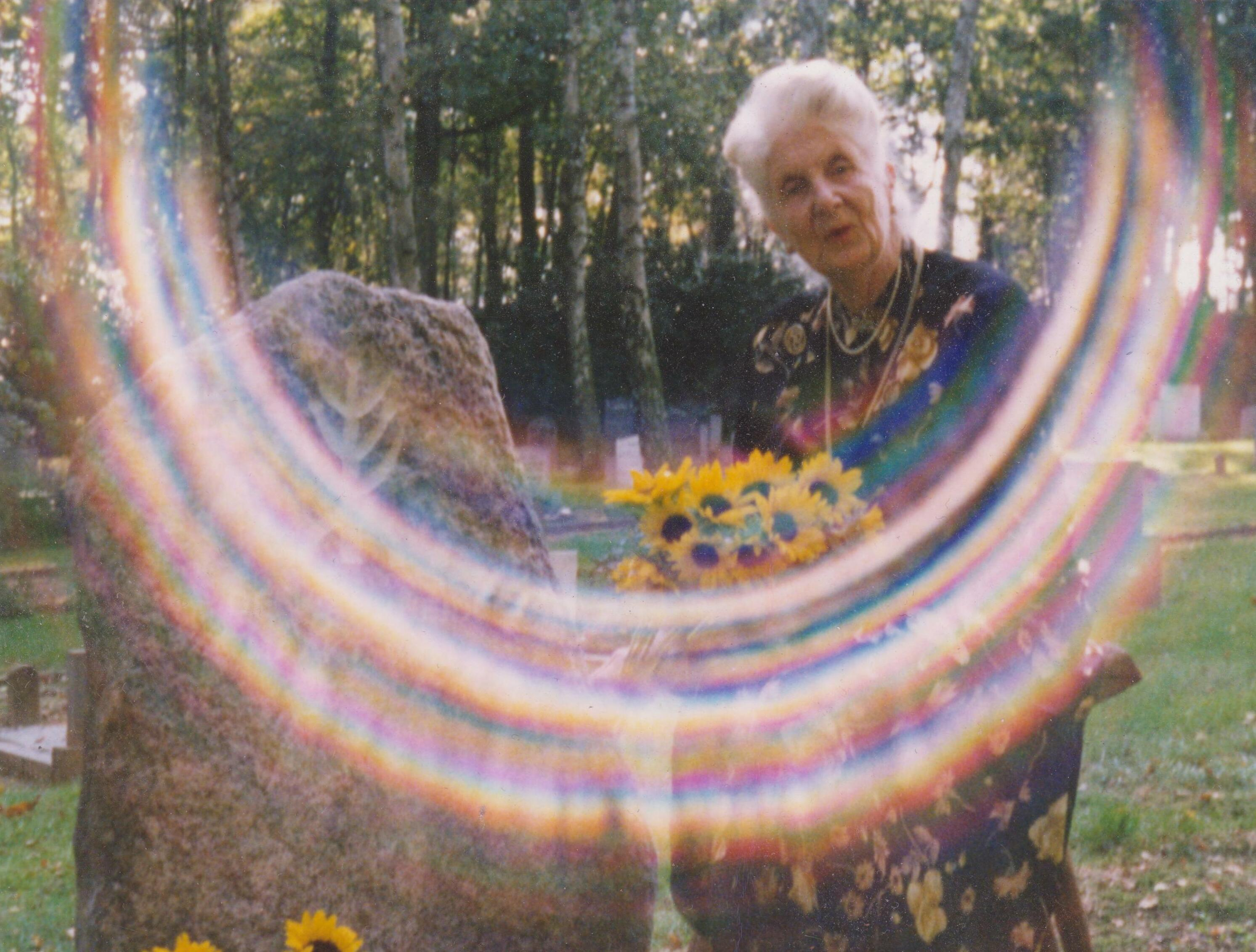
Rost van Tonningen at her future grave in 1998. She had bought the grave in 1996 and was buried there in 2007.

Rost van Tonningen-Heubel died of old age on 24 March 2007 in her home in Waasmunster, at the age of 92. She was survived by her three sons and twelve grandchildren. A week later, she was buried in Rheden. As early as 1996, she had bought a gravesite and a headstone with her name, date of birth and the inscription, "The truth makes free". The site is controversial, and local residents fear that the grave could become an attraction for many right wing extremists. This concern prompted the municipality of Rheden to lock down the area at the time of her funeral.

One of her sons, Egbert (Ebbe) Rost van Tonningen, published a memoir in 2012 about his childhood, In Niemandsland ("In no man's land").

== Literature ==
- F.S. Rost van Tonningen, Op zoek naar mijn huwelijksring, Velp (NL): De Levensboom, Erembodegem (B): De Krijger, 1990 ISBN 90-72345-14-2, transl. Triumph and Tragedy: Some Personal Remembrances of Dutch and European History in the 20th Century, Velp: De Levensboom 1998

== See also ==
- Gudrun Burwitz
- Diana Mitford
