= Thies Christophersen =

German Holocaust denier (1918–1997)

- Born: 27 January 1918; Kiel, Province of Schleswig-Holstein, Kingdom of Prussia, German Empire
- Died: 13 February 1997 (aged 79); Molfsee, Schleswig-Holstein, Germany
- Occupations: Publisher; Farmer
- Years active: 1965–1997
- Known for: Holocaust denial activism
- Criminal charges: Dissemination of Means of Propaganda of Unconstitutional Organizations; Insult of officials and the state
- Criminal penalty: Monetary fine of 1500 DM
- Spouse: Edith Tenzler (m. 1943)
- Children: 2

Thies Christophersen (27 January 1918 – 13 February 1997) was a German neo-Nazi publisher, SS-officer, and pamphleteer of Holocaust denial literature. His activism, which included unabashed support of Nazi Germany and self-styled Reichstag meetings, are generally considered an early precursor to the Reichsbürger movement.

== Early life ==
Christophersen was born in Kiel to a farming family residing in Kälberhagen near Mohrkirch. After completing compulsory school attendance, he was trained in agriculture to become a full-time farmer.

== Nazi Party ==
In 1931, Christophersen joined Deutsches Jungvolk, a suborganisation of the Hitler Youth. On 25 October 1937, he joined the Nazi Party (NSDAP number 4.765.641). In autumn 1939, Christophersen enlisted in the Wehrmacht to serve as a private on the Western Front during World War II, but he was removed from combat duty the following year due to a facial injury that left him with a "children's fist-sized" indentation at the nasal root. After reassignment to civil service in German-occupied Ukraine, Christophersen joined the Waffen-SS in 1943, where he received the rank of Sonderführer.

By 1944, Christophersen worked for the research department of the SS Main Office. In January of the same year, he was assigned to the natural rubber production program of Joachim Caesar, at the gardening sector of the livestock farm facility Rajsko, a subcamp of KZ Auschwitz, which was located three kilometres (1.9 mi) from the farming site. Staff identified Christophersen as a supervisor at the Russian dandelion greenhouses, where he frequently interacted with the roughly 300 female prisoners labouring as horticulturists, who had nicknamed him "Locher" ("hole puncher"). He personally picked several of them for the work during selection, as well as several Romani prisoners that would play music at his command. He did not, however, interact with the farmhands on the fields, who were frequently beaten on the spot for low productivity.

According to Christophersen, shortly after his arrival at Auschwitz, he had been told of the mass burning of Jewish prisoners by a Polish camp maid named Olga. When he asked fellow SS personnel about this, Christophersen stated that they "responded with shrugs of the shoulder and 'don't pay attention to these rumors'". He then insisted that, being in close proximity to the area, he would have been certain to identify mass killings and claimed that he never witnessed or was made aware of any such incidents. In a memoir, Christophersen wrote that he "experienced no atrocities or executions and neither [noticed] gas chambers nor flames from crematorium chimneys", describing his own stay as "pleasant". Although he never left Rajsko during his twelve-month station, in Die Auschwitz Lüge, he claimed to have toured the whole of Auschwitz II-Birkenau and Monowitz, and that prisoners were well-fed, sung while working, and that Jewish workers were dressed in "fancy stolen clothes". Christophersen spent his entire time at Rajsko and lacked any direct experience or knowledge of the brutal conditions or mass extermination at Auschwitz to serve as a credible source. Although he did acknowledge unsanitary and overcrowded conditions in Birkenau, but defended the presence of child prisoners at the subcamp, stating that it was "kinder" by Nazi authorities to keep them with their arrested parents. He also denied that Auschwitz had forced labour, claiming selection was merely a voluntary process for internees who "wanted to be occupied". He further described the prisoners, particularly the Polish and Jewish ones, as anti-communists who "prayed for German victory".

== Career ==
In 1945, after the surrender of Nazi Germany, Christophersen lied during his denazification process that he did not have Nazi Party membership and was released with the classification Mitläufer. He returned to Kiel, where he initially assumed ownership of his father's farm, also publishing articles on farming as an agricultural journalist. During the 1950s, Christophersen successively joined and left several right-wing parties, initially the Christian democratic CDU party, then the national conservative German Party and briefly the neo-Nazi NPD party, all of which he denounced as "too democratic, too lax".

In 1965, Christophersen wrote and published the monthly polemic magazine Deutscher Bauer ("German Farmer"), which was politically aligned against the local CDU-majority farmer's league. Despite its small readership of some 2000 and locally limited circulation, the magazine was sold in 1968 on 17 June to Gerhard Frey, who published it as part of his extreme right newspaper Deutsche National-Zeitung. However, as Christophersen was now relegated to writing advertising material rather than opinion pieces, he filed a legal case against Frey on 14 November, which resulted in Christophersen getting fired. The case went on for a month until both parties withdrew on 31 December after a private settlement, though Christophersen continued to comment negatively on his business relation with Frey. In 1969, he handed control of his farm to his son and founded the brochure Die Bauernschaft ("The Farming Community"), in which Christophersen disseminated further Holocaust-denying material. The brochure was distributed through a self-owned publishing house, Kritik-Verlag, and book trader, Nordwind. In his writings, Christophersen denounced the German constitution, accused guest workers of "weaponizing their natural fertility" and called for the establishment of a Fourth Reich.

Throughout the 1960s and 1970s, he forged close contacts, both domestically and internationally, with other proponents of the "Auschwitz lie" such as Udo Walendy, Robert Faurisson, David Irving, Otto Ernst Remer, and Florentine Rost van Tonningen, and with Stille Hilfe ("Silent Help"), an organisation assisting neo-Nazi activists. Christophersen appeared as a witness in the trial of Ernst Zündel in Canada.

In July 1972, Christophersen gained national attention after he publicly dumped a truckload of manure at the gates of the Fridericianum in Kassel to protest the documenta 5 exhibit being hosted there. He criticised the display as "western decadence" and a "waste of government funds", proclaiming his opposition to "the public advancement of women" and advertised his brochure Die Bauernschaft.

On 23 May 1975, Christophersen, together with Manfred Roeder, organised a rally at Deutsches Haus in Flensburg, which was attended by around 60 supporters. The date had been chosen because it coincided with the 30th anniversary on which the remaining Nazi leadership, including Karl Dönitz, the head of state after Hitler's suicide, surrendered to arrest by Allied forces. Christophersen had received a notice by city officials that such a gathering would be forbidden due to its unconstitutional nature, but Christophersen claimed that he wanted to wait until the rally began to inform his followers. During the rally, Christophersen proclaimed that the current administration was illegitimate and that he considered Karl Dönitz, who had since been released from prison and retired without further political involvement, the true reigning leader, claiming his arrest by the Allies was unlawful. Christophersen went on to say that he and his constituents were the follow-up government under Dönitz, the self-named "Reichstag zu Flensburg", which he said had regularly assembled under feigned book meetings. The rally was picketed by progressive counter-protesters who chanted "Nazis out", to which Christophersen's crowd chanted "Down with the democrats, down with the red scum". Christophersen's rally originally intended to march to Mürwik Naval School, where Dönitz and his entourage were arrested after the war, but prevented by the counter-protest and police. The right-wing protesters sang Germany's national anthem, including the usually omitted first and second stanza, and began lighting torches and burning the flags of the United States and the United Kingdom. Police subsequently broke up the rally, taking Christophersen and Roeder into custody for a few hours before releasing them.

On 26 May 1975, along with a circle of around 50 others, including Roeder, Christophersen hosted a meeting in a pub in Padborg, a Danish town close to the Schleswig-Holstein border, to avoid trouble with German authorities. Two NDR reporters, Jörgen Detlefsen and Thietmar Hambach, also attended to report on the matter for local radio. Roeder called Dönitz on the phone to ask if he would join them as the head of their counsel, but Dönitz declined, saying that he did not consider himself holding the office. Roeder took this as meaning that the office was vacant and promptly held an election for Dönitz's "successor", in a process that was explicitly not democratic, but instead an ancient Germanic law equivalent named Germanische Volksordnung ("Germanic people's order") that only allowed "equals" to vote. Before this could occur, the pub owner ordered the group to leave, saying that he was not made aware that Christophersen's reservation entailed an assembly. The group left after Roeder proclaimed that "we take notice that Denmark also does not have freedom of speech", calling the country "averse to anti-terror measures" and "easily buckled under media pressure". The meeting was continued in private in Germany, at a follower's farm in Kragstedt, where the group founded "Freiheitsbewegung Deutsches Reich" (FDR) to host future annual meet-ups. In writings of the July 1975 edition of Die Bauernschaft, Christophersen announced that "Reichstag zu Flensburg" was now in self-imposed exile. While it was planned for organisation to be based out of Vienna, the movement ultimately only hosted two further events in 1977 and 1978, both in Regensburg, during which Christophersen and Roeder praised Adolf Hitler as "the peacebringer" and declared Jews to be "the main enemy of the German people". The meetings were largely attended by Christophersen's inner circle and the right-wing militant group Wehrsportgruppe Hoffmann, who doubled as event security, standing guard dressed in faux-military uniforms. Further meetings were cancelled by Bavaria's state ministry of justice due to counter-protests.

In 1976, Christophersen was charged alongside Roeder with spreading Nazi propaganda and insult of the state, for which Christophersen received a fine of 1500 DM. In 1980, he was charged alongside Michael Kühnen with Volksverhetzung related to Nazi apologist material but the proceedings were halted against Christophersen. Christophersen needed to be escorted off the premises when security caught him attempting to urinate on the court building's wall. Christophersen moved to Belgium in 1981, where he continued to publish Die Bauernschaft. Belgian authorities arrested him on 23 August 1983 and handed him to German police that same day for criminal charges related to the content of his brochure. His trial was held in October 1983, where he was sentenced to a total of seventeen months imprisonment for Volksverhetzung and denigration of the memory of deceased persons, (related to guest writings by known neo-Nazis and a self-written article that called 20 July plot organiser Claus von Stauffenberg a traitor).The hearing was picketed by supporters of Kühnen's Action Front of National Socialists/National Activists.

In 1986, after a warrant was issued for his arrest related to incitement of violence and racial hatred, Christophersen fled the country to Kollund in Denmark. He moved to Kollund, a village of around one thousand people, located two kilometres from the German border, to live near his business partner Henry Krog Pedersen, a fellow SS-officer who worked with Christophersen in Auschwitz, and Pedersen's son Hans, a disbarred physician who lost his licence for "unethical practice". Both men received financial backing from regional neo-Nazi organisations. He described German judicial processes against him as "persecution for one's beliefs, just like the first Christians". Danish authorities were unwilling to extradite Christophersen since he had a valid residency permit and had applied for political asylum. Despite repeated communications between Germany and Denmark, Christophersen spent the next 10 years in the country. Attempts to stage right-wing rallys were denied by local government councils.

In Kollund, he established the Kollund-Verlag (Kollund Publishing House), which distributed denialist material throughout the world. He appeared in two videos, in which he claimed that it was a privilege for prisoners to be detained in Auschwitz. According to Christophersen they were treated excellently, and were given the opportunity to be deployed to work groups (in reality forced labour) appropriate to their professions, calling it a "religious-cultural supporting program". Die Bauernschaft was seized by the authorities several times, first in 1978 and last in 1994. In 1995 the distribution rights for this set of publications passed to Ernst Zündel in Canada, but he relinquished this just a year later.

In the film Die Auschwitz-Lüge und ihre Folgen ("The Auschwitz Lie and Its Consequences") he was interviewed by Ernst Zündel.

On 1 October 1994, Danish Antifa launched public protests against Christophersen's continued stay in Denmark, with the support of other residents. Fearing that this might lead to his extradition, as he had never been granted asylum nor have Danish citizenship, Christophersen left Kollund in April 1995 due to complaints by locals. He stayed on the island Fünen for a month before leaving Denmark trevelling through Europe for the rest of the year. He moved to the United Kingdom, then Belgium before settling in Switzerland, from where he was deported in early 1996. After spending a few months in Spain, he was forced to return to Germany, where he was arrested in late January 1997. Christophersen faced trial for his 1986 charges, but was judged to be unfit for detention due to his advanced age and poor health.

== Personal life and death ==
Christophersen married his wife Edith Tenzler (1909–2001) on 20 April 1943, having planned the date in advance to coincide with Adolf Hitler's birthday. The couple had two sons, both of whom were deceased by 2022. Christophersen cited a visit of his wife to Auschwitz as proof that the camp was not a mass extermination site, arguing that civilian entry would not have been permitted in that case. Edith was also involved in her husband's neo-Nazi activism and handled some of his affairs related to Die Bauernschaft while he lived abroad.

Christophersen died on 13 February 1997 at Henry Dunant-Heim senior facility in Molfsee, less than two weeks after his appearance in court. A public memorial service at a cemetery in Flensburg was planned by Christophersen's relatives and initially received a city permit, but the service was cancelled after Schleswig-Holstein Police discovered that 300 neo-Nazis had planned to attend the event. Christophersen's obituary, written by the Free German Workers' Party, used a variation of the phrase, "Ewig lebt der Toten Tatenruhm" ("The glory of the dead lives forever"), commonly used during the Nazi era and later by neo-Nazis to mourn dead German martyrs.

== Christophersen and the "Auschwitz Lie" ==
The widely known phrase "Auschwitz lie" (German Auschwitzlüge) can be traced to Christophersen, whose 1973 book of that name disputed the existence of gas chambers at the Auschwitz concentration camp. The book, "Auschwitz lie" was first published in German in 1973 under the title Die Auschwitz Lüge. The first English edition appeared in 1974 under the title The Auschwitz Lie. In August 1979, it was published in a completely revised and supplemented new edition. The brochure sold around 100,000 legal copies and continued circulation after its ban.

Along with Christophersen's own writings, that book also contains further contributions and forewords from other Holocaust deniers, including the former lawyer and convicted violent criminal Manfred Roeder (classified as a terrorist in Germany) and the former judge Wilhelm Stäglich. Since 1993 the book has been included on a list of materials that may not be distributed to young people, as ruled by Germany's Federal Department for Media Harmful to Young Persons, due to its Holocaust-denying content. The foreword by Manfred Roeder was characterised by that department as inflammatory anti-Semitic propaganda, which constitutes an infringement of Germany's Volksverhetzung law (incitement to hatred). Roeder rescinded his foreword in 1980 after being tried for a fatal fire bombing in Hamburg, with Christophersen commenting in Die Bauernschaft that Roeder had "crumbled to pressure" from judicial authorities.

During a private interview in July 1990 with filmmaker Michael Schmidt, who had entered the neo-Nazi underground scene for the 1991 TV documentary Wahrheit macht frei, Christophersen told Schmidt, whom he assumed to be a fellow neo-Nazi, that Die Auschwitz Lüge was a fabrication. He avoided the question of whether Auschwitz had gas chambers, instead responding "I did not write about gas executions in my report", but did admit he was biased and that "there certainly were German atrocities". Christophersen said "I wanted to exonerate and defend us and cannot do that with what we actually did", saying he was "not a denier", but, likening the book to a defense plea in court, he stated "every defense counsel who has to deflect something would never list the incriminating evidence".
