= 1980 Hamburg arson attack =

Right-wing terror attack in Hamburg

- Billbrook (Hamburg) Billbrook (Germany)
- Location: 53°31′30″N 10°4′29″E; Billbrook, Hamburg, Germany
- Date: 21 August 1980 (46 years ago); 23:00 – 0:10 (CEST (UTC+02:00))
- Target: Vietnamese refugees
- Attack type: Arson, hate crime
- Weapon: Molotov cocktails
- Deaths: 2
- Injuries: 3
- Perpetrator: Deutsche Aktionsgruppen
- Assailants: Sibylle Vorderbrügge; Raymund Hörnle; Heinz Colditz
- Motive: Neo-Nazism; Xenophobia
- Convictions: Murder; Attempted murder Aiding and abetting Leadership/membership of an unconstitutional terror network
- Convicted: 14

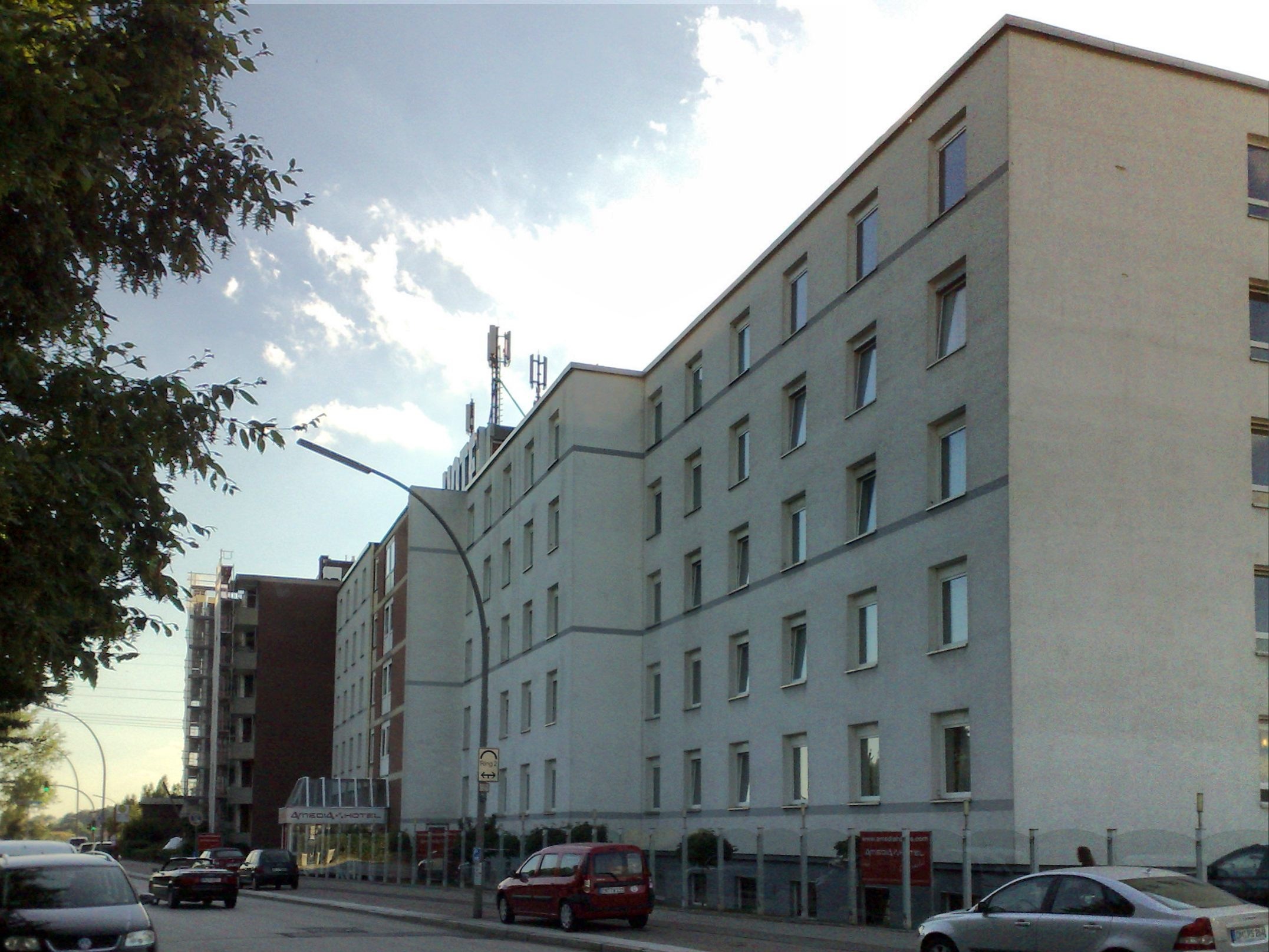
Amedia Hotel in Hamburg-Moorfleet, former refugee housing, and site of the 1980 arson attack.

On the night of 21–22 August 1980, an arson attack was committed on a refugee accommodation in the Billbrook quarter of Hamburg, Germany, by members of the neo-Nazi terrorist organisation Deutsche Aktionsgruppen (DA). Two people were fatally wounded and died the following week, while three others were injured. The attack is considered the first hate crime murders in BRD history.

All three of the main perpetrators were arrested. Two received life sentences while one was sentenced to six years prison time. The founder of Deutsche Aktionsgruppen, Holocaust denier Manfred Roeder, was also sentenced to 13 years imprisonment. Ten others were tried and received lesser prison sentences or conditional release.

== Background ==
Following the end of the Vietnam War in 1975, several hundred thousand of refugees, primarily Hoa, fled the country, often by boat. By the end of 1978, approximately 1,300 Vietnamese refugees were granted asylum in West Germany, significantly less than other countries, but their presence nevertheless led to the nation's first debate on asylum and immigration policy. Their presence led to a surge of protest against foreigners.

The Deutsche Aktionsgruppe was founded in 1980 by Manfred Roeder. It had committed six prior attacks using explosives across Germany since February 1980, targeting refugee accommodations and Holocaust memorial sites.

== Attack ==
At around 23:00 on 21 August 1980, a van carrying three members of the Deutsche Aktionsgruppen drove to Halskestraße 72 in the industrial area of Billbrook. A shelter building was being used as a refugee accommodation, housing 221 Vietnamese refugees. 24-year-old Sibylle Vorderbrügge and 49-year-old Raymund Hörnle left the vehicle while 50-year-old Heinz Colditz remained inside. Vorderbrügge and Hörnle carried three bottles filled with gasoline stuffed with cleaning wool as fuses, but they had trouble lighting them due to heavy rain. They waited until the rain subsided after midnight, then used red spraypaint to write "Ausländer raus!" ("Foreigners get out!") on the wall. Afterwards, Vorderbrügge and Hörnle lit the incendiary devices and threw them into a first floor window, into room 34, occupied by 22-year-old Nguyễn Ngọc Châu and 18-year-old Đỗ Anh Lân, both part of the Hoa minority. Both men were asleep at the time and received severe burns from the fire. Staff and other residents were initially unable to reach the pair because the door was locked from the inside and were only able to help when the still-burning Đỗ opened the lock.

Vorderbrügge and Hörnle ran off and fled back into the van to drive away. The vehicle had been reported in a previous instance of vandalism a few days earlier in Thieshope, after a motorist saw a man and a woman spraypaint a traffic sign on A7, so the licence plate was in police records and quickly connected due to the usage of the same xenophobic slogan. The group was arrested on 1 September in Hannoversch Münden.

== Victims ==
=== Nguyễn Ngọc Châu ===
Nguyễn Ngọc Châu (Chinese: 阮玉珠) was born on 26 July 1958 in Saigon. He had been rescued during a shipwreck in the South China Sea by the Cap Anamur ship and arrived in Hamburg in April 1980, where he worked as a teacher for other Vietnamese refugees. Nguyễn died hours after the attack at around 9 a.m. on 22 August 1980.

=== Đỗ Anh Lân ===
Đỗ Anh Lân (Chinese: 杜英璘) was born on 10 March 1962 in the Chợ Lớn quarter of Saigon. His family believed in Chinese folk religion, and although fluent in both Vietnamese and Yue, they could not read the Vietnamese alphabet. His mother Đỗ Mùi ran a textile workshop. He was a student and fled Vietnam due to fears of possible conscription. His parents stayed behind because they could not afford the escape of more than one person. He had been displaced to Pulau Bidong since 1977 and relocated to Hamburg on 14 August 1979, when a humanitarian flight was arranged by the German newspaper Die Zeit. Đỗ had received burns on 40% of his body and despite extensive treatment at Boberg Hospital, he died of his wounds on 31 August 1980, nine days after the bombing. His mother, who had remained in Saigon, only found out about his death upon her immigration the following month. In a 2018 interview, she stated, "My son thought he would be safe from bombs in Germany. And then in Germany, they killed him with a bomb."

Two neighbouring residents, Thị Kim Thoa and Ngũ Thời Trọng, received less severe burn injuries from the fire. Another man, Huynh Thoâng, was injured while attempting pat down the flames on Đỗ Anh Lân.

== Perpetrators ==
Sibylle Vorderbrügge (born 1956) was from Bremerhaven and worked as a medical assistant for radiology. She had become the girlfriend of Manfred Roeder, 51 years old and married at the time, a year earlier. Even before meeting Roeder, Vorderbrügge wrote in 1978 that she and Roeder were "destined by God to be together" and later said that she "thank[ed] him for making her a true German".

Raymund Hörnle (born 1930) was from Kirchheim unter Teck and worked as a construction foreman. During World War II, he was part of the Flieger-Hitler Youth, though by his own account, he only joined in order to avoid potential service in the Waffen-SS. His father was an early member of the Nazi Party, being the recipient of a Golden Party Badge. Hörnle had built all the makeshift explosives for the DA's terrorist attacks in his workshop garage in Kirchheim's Jesingen quarter.

Heinz Colditz (born 2 January 1930) was from Leipzig and worked as an otorhinolaryngologist, specializing as an ear doctor, in Kirchheim unter Teck. He was previously ousted from a doctor's office in Herrenberg for refusing to treat patients with a foreign background. He was a member of Deutsches Jungvolk and became a Hauptscharführer in the Hitler Youth by 1945. Since 1975, Colditz was a follower and financial backer of Roeder, whom he occasionally sheltered at his house in Dettingen. He considered Roeder the direct successor of Adolf Hitler as "Führer", hosted meetings between Roeder and other Völkisch movement figures at his home and recruited Hörnle, a patient of his, to the DA.

== Trial ==
In January 1982, the defendants were tried at the Stuttgart Higher Regional Court in Stuttgart-Stammheim. An investigation showed that the Deutsche Aktionsgruppen had spontaneously decided to attack the Vietnamese refugee accommodation after reading about the refugee situation in a newspaper, having previously failed to cause substantial damage or injury during a school bombing in Hamburg.

All three perpetrators issued full confessions and admissions of guilt. DA founder Manfred Roeder denied any connection and blamed his companions for acting at their own volition. Sibylle Vorderbrügge and Raymund Hörnle voiced regret, stating they "believed Germany was in a state of war" and that they "only wanted to scare foreigners, not kill anyone". Each of their lawyers claimed that Vorderbrügge, described as "naïve, undiscerning, immature, and childish" was "mentally and sexually dependent" on Roeder, while Hörnle, described as "simple-minded", had been manipulated into participating with flattery and the lure of friendship by the academic Heinz Colditz.

On 28 June 1982, Vorderbrügge and Hörnle were sentenced to life in prison for murder, attempted murder, and membership in a terror network. Colditz was sentenced to six years imprisonment for aiding and abetting. Though Manfred Roeder did not directly participate in the murders, he was found guilty of leading an unconstitutional terror network and received 13 years imprisonment, of which he ultimately served eight before being released on good behaviour. Roeder voiced contempt for Vietnamese and other Southeast Asian people during court proceedings, calling them "half-apes".

Ten other persons, mostly relatives and family friends of the defendants, were also tried for affiliation with the Deutsche Aktionsgruppen. Hörnle's son was sentenced to 21 months of probation for providing his father with material for several bombs. Colditz's daughter, Gabrielle S., was a member of Deutsche Aktionsgruppen and had introduced Vorderbrügge to her father and later Roeder. Gabrielle S. received four years imprisonment for committing a bombing at the Bullenhuser Damm subcamp memorial. Her husband Klaus-Peter S. was given two years on parole.

In 1997, in line with German law that allows for release petitions after 15 years, Vorderbrügge and Hörnle were released. They did not return to the radical right-wing underground and are presumed to have not reoffended.

== Aftermath ==
As only room 34 was structurally damaged, with superficial damage to the façade and neighbouring rooms, the accommodation remained. On 4 September 1980, a memorial service was held in Öjendorf Cemetery in Billstedt, where Hamburg mayor Hans-Ulrich Klose read a eulogy. The bodies were later exhumed and buried elsewhere. Besides the clearing off the burned area by building staff, no further assistance was provided.

The attack did not stay in public view for long. The event was not memorialised in city or government services until 2014. In 2020, on the 40th anniversary, a memorial pillar was installed at Öjendorf Cemetery. The unveiling was attended by the survivors of the bombing, the deceased's godparents Gisela and Heribert von Goldammer, and the mother of Đỗ Anh Lân. On 11 May 2024, Halskestraße was renamed Châu-und-Lân Straße in honor of the two victims.

== See also ==
- 1984 Duisburg arson attack – Arson attack in Germany
- 1992 Mölln arson attack – Neo-nazi terror attack on a Turkish family in Germany
- 1993 Solingen arson attack – Neo-Nazi arson attack on Turkish home in Solingen
- 2024 Solingen arson attack – Arson attack in Solingen, Germany
