= Meinoud Rost van Tonningen =

Dutch Nazi politician (1894-1945)

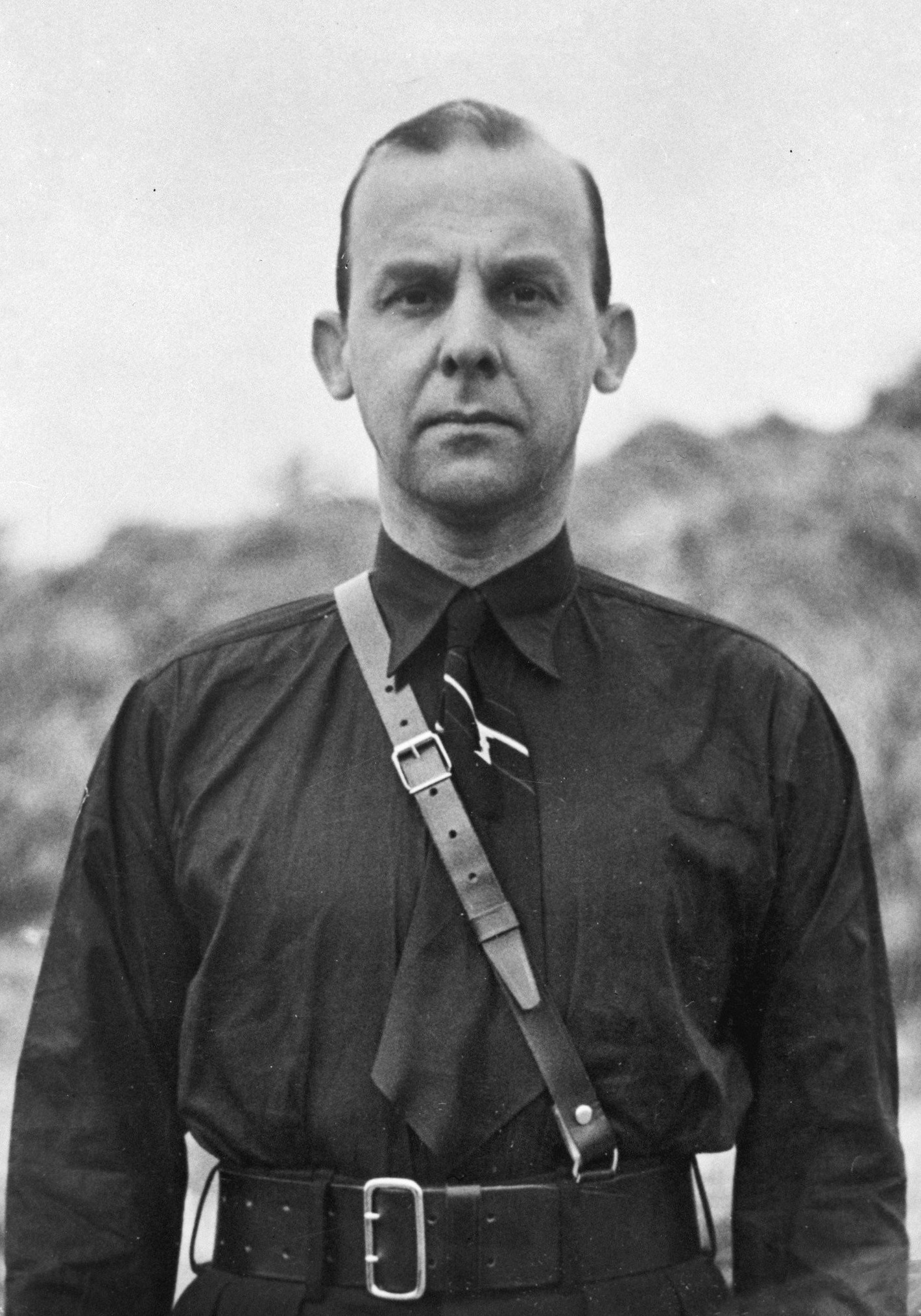

Member of the House of Representatives
- In office 1937–1945

13th President of Dutch Central Bank
- In office 1941–1945

Personal details
- Born: Meinoud Marinus Rost van Tonningen; 19 February 1894 Surabaya, Dutch East Indies
- Died: 6 June 1945 (aged 51) Scheveningen, Netherlands
- Cause of death: suicide
- Party: National Socialist Movement (NSB)
- Spouse: Florentine Heubel (m. 1940)
- Education: University of Leiden
- Profession: Diplomat
- Military career
- Allegiance: Nazi Germany
- Branch: SS
- Service years: 1944-45
- Conflicts: World War II

Meinoud Marinus Rost van Tonningen (19 February 1894 – 6 June 1945) was a member of the National Socialist Movement (NSB). During the German occupation of the Netherlands in World War II, he collaborated extensively with the German occupation forces. He was the husband of Florentine Rost van Tonningen.

== Early life ==
Meinoud Marinus Rost van Tonningen was born on 19 February 1894 on the island of Java, in the city of Surabaya in the Dutch East Indies (present-day Indonesia). He was the son of KNIL general Marinus Bernardus Rost van Tonningen, who had distinguished himself suppressing the revolts against Dutch rule on Lombok, Aceh and Bali. After high school he completed legal studies at the University of Leiden.

In the periods 1923–1928 and 1931–1936, he was representative of the League of Nations in Vienna. His job was to monitor the Austrian financial policy. While stationed in Vienna, he developed strong antisemitic and anti-communist convictions. He became close friends with Engelbert Dollfuss, who became Chancellor of Austria in 1932 and who was murdered in 1934.

== NSB period ==
He became a member of the NSB on 7 August 1936 after returning from Austria. He won a seat in Parliament in the elections that year and became the leader of his parliamentary party in the Dutch House of Representatives.

He also became editor-in-chief of the NSB party newspaper, Het Nationale Dagblad, which he made into a vessel of his own ideas to the dismay of the NSB party leadership. Rost van Tonningen was obsessed with Germany and the Greater German Idea, while Anton Mussert, the leader of the NSB, had more affinity with the idea of Fascism as carried out by Benito Mussolini in Italy.

It was mainly Rost van Tonningen's influence that caused the NSB to become more openly antisemitic; Rost van Tonningen's antisemitism was more radical than NSB leader Anton Mussert. Because of his influence, the NSB became closer to the German Nazi Party, the NSDAP.

1939 saw Rost van Tonningen establish the paramilitary organisation – the Mussert guards. Many members of this organisation later became members of the Nederlandsche SS. Rost van Tonningen's request to be admitted as a member of the SS Westland regiment was at first denied, because he had been born in the Dutch East Indies, and was unable to obtain documents showing that his family had 150 years of "pure Aryan blood". However, from 1943, Indos (Dutch Eurasians) could join the lower ranks of the Waffen SS. (Whereas those deemed to be "Native Indonesians", with no or little European ancestry, were still not allowed.) In 1944, Rost van Tonningen again applied for membership of the SS, and was admitted.

== German occupation of the Netherlands ==
During the German occupation of the Netherlands, Rost van Tonningen was appointed liquidation commissar for all Marxist organisations by Arthur Seyss-Inquart, the Austrian administrator for the Netherlands.

This was targeted especially at the Social Democratic Workers' Party (SDAP), the Revolutionary Socialist Party (RSAP), and the Communist Party (CPN). The CPN and RSAP had to be liquidated, while the SDAP had to be "reconstructed" based on Nazi doctrine. This reconstruction failed because the SDAP had destroyed most of its archives and administration papers.

The SDAP leadership refused to cooperate, and during regional meetings of the SDAP it was announced that the SDAP would not collaborate with the German occupation forces. Virtually all SDAP affiliated organisations refused to cooperate with Rost van Tonningen's attempts to 'Nazify' them. Most organisations (e.g., Labourers Sports Association, musical organisations) chose to dissolve themselves rather than become part of the Nazi hierarchy. On 5 July 1941, the SDAP was disbanded, together with all other remaining political parties.

== Financial administrator ==
On 26 March 1941, Rost van Tonningen was appointed to the posts of Secretary-General of the Finance ministry and President of the Dutch Central Bank, the Nederlandsche Bank. During his tenure in these functions, the Germans held the Netherlands financially responsible for the costs of the occupation of their country. The total cost of this to the Dutch society was calculated by the Dutch government after the war as being 9,488,000,000 Reichsmark. Besides this amount, an amount of 5,750,000,000 Reichsmark of loans made by the Netherlands to Germany was never repaid, so a total amount of 14,500,000,000 Reichsmark flowed to Germany. (Comparison: France 43,250,000,000 and Belgium 11,070,000,000.)

On 1 April 1941, the currency barriers between the Netherlands and the Third Reich were removed, and on 1 September 1941, the last obstructions in the currency markets between the two countries were finally removed. This meant that the Germans could trade the gold of the Dutch National Bank for paper Reichsmarks.

The other financial heads of occupied territories were not as eager as Rost van Tonningen to remove the barriers and the Netherlands could not spend the Reichsmarks obtained in this way to pay these other countries. The other territories brought their Reichsmarks to the Netherlands to pay their foreign debt; Germany, Denmark, Hungary and Occupied France all paid their debts in this way. This and the purchase of Dutch goods for Reichsmarks by the Germans made the Dutch balance of Reichsmarks grow from 83,000,000 (March 1941) to 3,646,000,000 (September 1941). Rost van Tonningen in the meantime kept printing large amounts of Dutch money. This led to large inflation figures.

As Secretary-General for Special Economic Affairs, Rost van Tonningen was involved in the establishment of the Nederlandse Oostcompagnie (Dutch East Company), an organisation involved in the reconstruction of Ukraine. The efforts of this company were an abysmal failure.

== Death ==
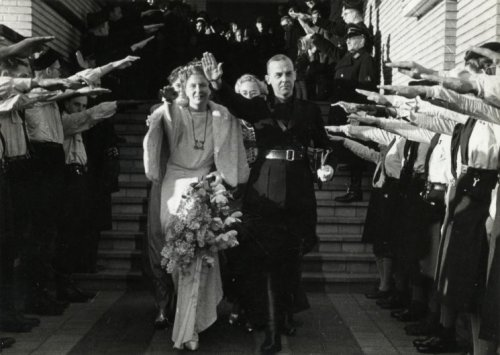
Meinoud Rost van Tonningen married Florentine Heubel in 1940

On 5 September 1944, Dolle Dinsdag (Mad Tuesday), Rost van Tonningen fled with a number of other Dutch collaborators, fearing the rapidly advancing Allied armies. He turned up again a few days later, but was fired from his position as successor to the NSB leadership by Anton Mussert after writing an article in which he praised the members of the Dutch NSB youth organisation (Nationale Jeugdstorm, National Youth Storm) who had joined the Hitlerjugend division.

In the summer of 1944, Rost van Tonningen was trained to be an officer in the first battalion of the Landstorm Nederland, a Dutch paramilitary defense organisation. In March 1945 he left for the frontlines, which ran through the middle of the Netherlands, in the Betuwe. On 8 May 1945 he was taken prisoner by Canadian troops, and was held in a prisoner camp in Elst. From there he was transferred to Utrecht and on 24 May 1945 he was moved to the prison in Scheveningen. Rost van Tonningen allegedly committed suicide there by jumping from a balcony in the prison on 6 June 1945.

== Family ==
His second wife, Florentine Rost van Tonningen, continued to promote pro-German and Nazi views after the war, denying the Holocaust and regretting the fall of the Third Reich and any threat to racial purity. One of their sons, Ebbe Rost van Tonningen, published a memoir in 2012 about his childhood, In Niemandsland ("In No Man's Land").
