= 2024 Solingen arson attack =

Arson attack in Solingen, Germany

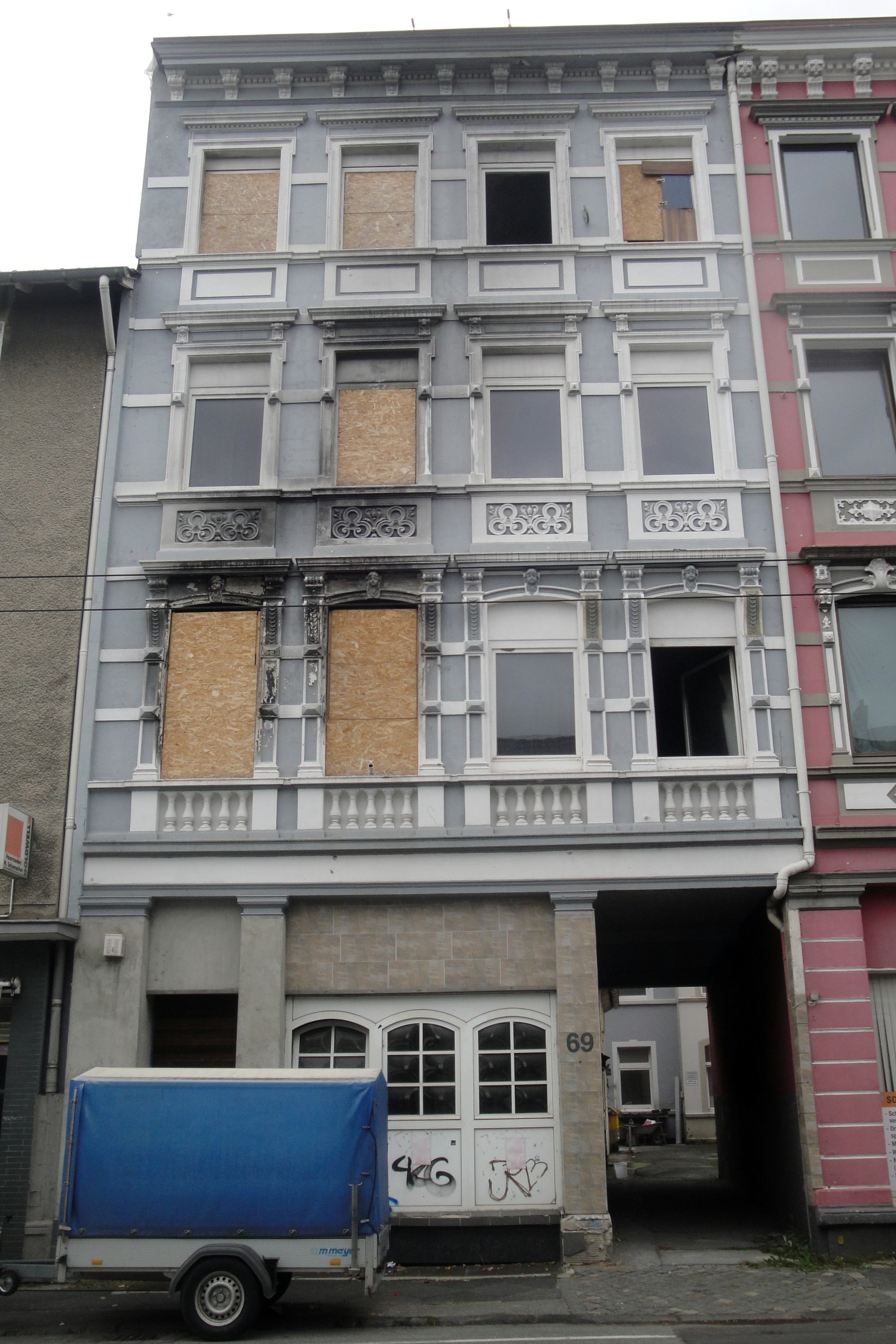
- The fire damaged building in September 2025.

- Solingen (North Rhine-Westphalia) Solingen (Germany)
- Location: 51.16°N 7.07°E; Grünewalder Straße; Solingen, North Rhine-Westphalia, Germany
- Date: 25 March 2024 (2 years ago) c. 2:40 a.m. (CET)
- Attack type: Arson, mass murder, child murder
- Weapon: Gasoline
- Deaths: 4
- Injuries: 21
- Perpetrator: Daniel Szalla
- Convictions: Murder; Attempted murder Arson; Assault
- Judge: Jochen Kötter

On the night of 24–25 March 2024, an arson attack was committed on an apartment building in Solingen, North Rhine-Westphalia, Germany. The four-person Zhilov family was killed and 21 others were injured. The perpetrator, 39-year-old Daniel Szalla, was arrested two weeks later and confessed to the crime. In July 2025, he was convicted of four counts of murder, 21 counts of attempted murder, as well as multiple counts of arson and assault. He received a life sentence.

Most apartment residents had an immigrant background, including the Zhilovs, who were Bulgarian Turks, leading to speculation that the attack was politically motivated. When Szalla was revealed to have a history as a right-wing extremist, relatives of the victims and activist groups advocated for an investigation into potential xenophobic motives. State authorities concluded that there was not enough evidence to label the arson a hate crime.

== Attack ==
On the evening of 24 March 2024, the perpetrator drove from his home in Solingen to the four-storey residential complex on Grünewalder Straße 69 in Höhscheid district. Surveillance footage captured the perpetrator loitering at a nearby gas station. At around 2:30, he entered through the unlocked front entrance, carrying a gas canister in his backpack. The perpetrator emptied the container on the wooden stairwell of the ground floor before lighting the fuel and exiting the building, but stayed close by to watch the fire. Within five minutes, the fire spread up the building via the chimney effect and by 2:45, the fire had engulfed the entire building, leading to the first emergency calls from residents inside. The city fire department arrived at 2:53. Police had arrived earlier than the fire crew, despite the department being only a few hundred meters away from the site.

== Victims ==
A family of four, who resided in the attic apartment, died from burn injuries. They were a married couple, 29-year-old Kancho (İsmail) Emilov Zhilov and 28-year-old Katya (Kıymet) Todorova Zhilova, and their two daughters, three-year-old Galia (Gizem) Kancheva Zhilova und five-month-old Emily (Elis) Kancheva Zhilova. The family had moved from Bulgaria to Germany in February 2024. Their home village Kostievo was informed of the deaths hours after the fire at noon. The Consulate of Bulgaria in Frankfurt confirmed their identities the same day. Their bodies were transported back to Kostievo where a joint funeral was held in June 2024.

21 tenants of the building were injured, of whom nine were hospitalised. They included two relatives of the Zhilov family, Ayşe and Nihat Kostadinchev, had jumped out of their third-floor flat with their seven-month-old son Salih as they fell; the couple sustained severe injuries and all three suffered fractured ribs.

== Perpetrator ==
Daniel Gerrit Szalla (born 7 December 1984) was an unemployed resident of Solingen. He had dropped out of several training courses, multiple prior convictions for fraud, and long-standing issues with amphetamine and gambling addiction. He had previously lived at the rear section of the targeted apartment building, but was evicted due to a dispute with the landlady over outstanding rent payments. He was living with his girlfriend in a house owned by his father.

=== Arrest ===
A warrant for his arrest was issued shortly after the Solingen attack. Szalla was taken into custody for a separate charge of attempted manslaughter on 8 April 2024. Szalla had attacked a 45-year-old friend with a machete during a drug deal at the victim's flat, approximately one kilometre from the arson crime scene. The victim was sprayed with pepper spray and repeatedly hit in the head, surviving with life-threatening injuries. Szalla stated that the victim had cheated him after paying 200 euro for cannabis, only to receive "newspaper crumps". He admitted that his intention was to scalp the victim. A witness alleged that Szalla had shouted "Sieg Heil" during the machete attack.

== Investigation ==
At the start of the investigation, police did not immediately suspect arson. However, residue of fire accelerant led to the analysis of nearby surveillance cameras which showed a figure identified by a distinct backpack just before the fire. A suspect was arrested on 29 March 2024, but released a day later for lack of evidence and providing an alibi.

Media noted parallels to the 1993 Solingen arson attack, in which neo-Nazis set an apartment with Turkish residents on fire, killing five people, including three children. Publicly, police did not confirm or deny the possibility for a political motive. Media had noted that all but one of the building's tenants had a migration background, though reports after Szalla's arrest speculated that the fire could have been set due to his conflict with his former landlady. In April 2024, a female police officer added a handwritten addendum to the case file about a potential right-wing motive. However, the comment was struck out the same day and left out of subsequent records. The removal was first believed to have been carried out by a member of Wuppertal Police, but it was later announced that state security had done so after review, with the reasoning that the officer who had collected the evidence and made the entry did not have enough experience.

Szalla was the subject of a private lawsuit following an argument with two men with migration background, in which Szalla had assaulted one man by throwing a metal fence. Police refused to launch an investigation. His search history around that time showed that he looked up "death of private plaintiff", "plaintiff passed away", and "weapon darknet".

A search of Szalla's apartment found several gas pistols, machetes, illegal fireworks, more gas canisters and incendiary devices. Also recovered was Nazi memorabilia in the form of over a dozen books, including Mein Kampf and Werk und Mensch, written by Adolf Hitler and Hermann Göring respectively, christmas ornaments with swastika designs, as well as physical audio recordings of Hitler speeches. A poem with racist lyrics was found in a garage used by Szalla, but its exact content was initially not ascertained because police had not copied down the writing. There were digitalised copies of several posters depicting Hitler, some posing with a gas cylinder, with handwritten comments, such as "Ho-Ho-Holocaust", "Everything sucks without you" and "I stand for this with my name". Szalla's digital devices contained 166 far-right images, including more photos of Hitler and NSU terrorist Beate Zschäpe, as well as child pornography. Szalla had attended a rally for the far-right Alternative for Germany (AfD) in the past, and listened to music he termed "NS-Schlager". Szalla had regular online chats with friends, in which he commented that he was glad that "kanaks" were "blowing up each other with fireworks", and complained that about the presence of immigrants in Wuppertal's Oberbarmen quarter. On Google and YouTube, Szalla repeatedly searched for Wehrmacht music, German WWII weapons, AfD, the phrase "Ausländer raus" ("Foreigners get out"), and videos published by the far-right magazine Compact. A few days before the arson, Szalla had also looked up "Mord Strafrecht" ("Murder criminal law").

Szalla's girlfriend Jessica B. claimed that her boyfriend wasn't a part of the far right, but stated that he had close friends with "identitarian" beliefs and that Szalla's brother was a neo-Nazi. B. alleged that she and Szalla discussed the possibility that he had schizophrenia, which the latter denied. An ex-girlfriend, Luisa Maria P., stated that Szalla had low motivation and a "weak mind". Court psychiatrist Pedro Faustmann described Szalla as "schizoid compulsive", stating that Szalla's "fascination with Nazi symbols" was not ideological, but instead about "self-stabilising" due to confidence issues.

The prosecution called the material recovered from Szalla's residence and devices "speculation without evidentiary content", and pointed to a brochure for the satirical political party Die PARTEI found in the apartment as a lack of political position and that he had no known connections to far-right organisations through online services. Police also said that the hard drive containing the Nazi imagery and child pornography was from "the techno era, a long time ago for [Szalla]", though he had synchronised the content with his phone. Szalla's girlfriend claimed ownership of the hard drive, but said that she had "no idea" where the downloaded material was from, alleging that several of her roommates had possession of the hard drive between 2016 and 2017. A Turkish woman who lived opposite of Szalla during his residence at Grünewalder Straße testified that Szalla was "super nice and friendly" and never made racist remarks in her presence. Despite this characterisation, the witness also stated that Szalla had once attacked his then-pregnant landlady in a fit of rage, prompting the witness to hide with her parents out of fear. She "couldn't imagine" her neighbour being an arsonist, although she had once seen an unusual amount of fire accelerant hoarded in his bathroom once.

Police records showed that investigators had first incorrectly attributed the literature found in Szalla's apartment as belonging to his father because similar material had been found at his parents' house. Later during the trial, a 59-year-old officer of Wuppertal Police denied any relevance to the items found, asserting that they only showed the perpetrator's "historical interests".

In March 2025, the interior ministry of North Rhine-Westphalia acknowledged failures in the evidence department, which had excluded the digital and physical material relating to Nazism from their investigation. Minister of the Interior Herbert Reul claimed that a possible right-wing motive was only forwarded to his office via media reports. In May 2025, it was revealed that Daniel Szalla and his father had both been assessed by constitutional protective authorities. A file written by the federal ministry of justice stated that "a deep-seated connection, possibly identification with extreme-right ideology can be assumed for the defendant". The entry was later changed by hand to remove the comments and the file removed entirely from Szalla's dossier.

=== Related arsons ===
In custody, Szalla confessed to two previous arsons targeting apartment buildings in Solingen. On 9 November 2022, he had set the basement of the Grünewalder Straße building on fire using grill lighter cubes soaked in flammable liquid, but the fire was extinguished by firefighters before reaching the upper stairways. The landlady had named Szalla as a likely suspect, but he was never interrogated.

In February 2024, he poured several litres of flammable liquid on a staircase at a residence on Josefstraße and set it alight, but the fire did not spread and burned out on its own. He had not lived at the latter residence and the tenants of both buildings were predominantly immigrants. DNA evidence on the incendiary devices confirmed Szalla's involvement for both cases.

During his trial, Szalla was also accused of a fourth arson at his girlfriend's former apartment building in Wuppertal on 5 January 2022. Shortly before Szalla's girlfriend Jessica B. was set to move out, Szalla had been in a dispute with a neighbour, Jammal H., who was of Moroccan descent. Afterwards, two fires were set at opposite ends of the building. A neighbour, Angelika F., testified that she overheard an argument between the couple shortly after, during which B. appeared drunk and said "Don't do that again. People could have died in that fire". She also stated that Szalla was known to make racist comments about Turks, such as that they were "finishing off each other these days" and "doing the dirty work themselves". The night after the testimony was made, the cat door of the neighbour was broke open and a letter left behind, authored by the girlfriend and one of her friends, admonishing the neighbour for mentioning this exchange without consulting her first, calling her "mean" and accusing Angelika F. of having an alcohol problem. Police had not investigated for arson and attributed the fires to technical defects, but launched a renewed investigation during the trial. A fire inspector confirmed arson as the actual cause for both fires.

While testifying in court, an ex-girlfriend also mentioned that she suspected that Szalla was responsible for two acts of vandalism to her car in 2021. In the first of the incidents, the car's tires were slashed and in the second, the vehicle was set on fire. Although the crimes were reported to police, she had not thought to name Szalla as a suspect at the time.

== Trial ==
Szalla's trial, dubbed the Grünewald-Trial, began on 20 January 2025 at Landgericht Wuppertal. In addition to his charges for the Grünewald Straße fire, he was to be tried for ten counts of attempted murder in coinciding with severe arson and attempted arson resulting in death in the 2022 arson case, and two counts of attempted murder coinciding with attempted arson resulting in death in the February 2024 case.

On 3 February 2025, Szalla read a written confession in court, admitting he had lit a previous fire at the apartment and two more at different locations. He also stated that the machete attack was a result of guilt and fear from the arson attack, and that he acted out of "stress" since he believed his arrest was imminent. The motive, in his own words, was "stress with landlady". The defence claimed that Szalla committed the arson as vengeance against his former landlady due to psychiatric issues, mentioning that he had recently relapsed after substance abuse counselling and consumed amphetamine shortly before the arson. The assessor stated that the defendant sought an "ego boost" by setting fires, but stated that it was "difficult to say" why the specific locations were chosen. The lawyers of the co-plaintiffs in the case argued that Szalla was motivated by right-wing extremism, citing the recovered contents of Szalla's apartment.

One of Szalla's attorneys, Jochen Ohliger, had previously defended one of the perpetrators in the 1993 Solingen arson attack. Ohlinger called the allegations of political motives "Nazi fuss" and claimed that his client did not care about the nationalities of the victims, positing that he would have targeted the building "even if there was an district office of the AfD inside".

On 30 July 2025, following a one-hour delay, Szalla was found guilty of all counts and sentenced to life imprisonment. Due to the court's recognisition of particular severity of guilt, he will be unlikely to receive the usual chance for parole after 15 years and spent his sentence in preventive detention. Additionally, he was required to make four compensation payment to the families of the victims, totalling 47,000 euro. The court ultimately argued in favour of the defence following a psychiatric evaluation and decided that the right-wing material could not be determined to be case relevant, saying that the perpetrator's digital footprint in regards to searches with right-wing extremist content was "in per mille" range when stretched over the past decade. Instead, the judge found reason to believe that Szalla's "unstable early home life", referring to the separation of his parents and regular moves during his childhood, resulted in him becoming a loner with a "lack of direction", which the court believed contributed to his mental instability.

== Aftermath ==
On 28 March 2024, the Maritsa Municipality Council Session held a minute of silence for the Zhilov family. During the meeting, Municipality Mayor Dimitar Ivanov proposed that 6,000 leva from the municipality budget should be donated to the family's relatives to pay for transport costs of the bodies, which was passed with unanimous agreement, also agreeing to set up a donation box in their name.

On 30 March 2024, 700 people, mostly Bulgarian and Turkish residents, participated in a memorial march for the Zhilov family. Another 120 people held a candlelight vigil at the burned-out apartment. In February 2025, the father of Kancho Zhilov built two fountains in Kostievo to commemorate the family, one in front of the town hall and another in the park. At the one-year anniversary in 2025, another memorial was held at the site, organised by DİTİB and Adalet Solingen, a remembrance movement founded by relatives and friends.

Following the verdict, supporters of the victims' families continued to dispute the official court ruling regarding the motive. Survivors Ayşe and Nihat Kostadinchev told Plovdiv24 that they agreed with the sentence, but also believed that a potential neo-Nazi background was being covered up. The couple were also seeking pain and suffering, which was in the process of being approved as of March 2026. It was reported that the parents of Katya and Kancho Zhilov were not eligible for monetary compensation as they could not prove psychological trauma. A petition to Minister of the Interior Herbert Reul was started by the victims' families in September 2025, demanding an independent reinvestigation of the attack, which collected 12,500 signatures as of March 2026. The Amadeu Antonio Foundation has included the arson in its chronology of right-wing motivated violence. The foundation criticised the police investigation in ignoring Daniel Szalla's far-right political ideology, particularly in the prior arson cases, noting that one arson had taken place on the anniversary of the Nazi-era November pogroms.

== See also ==
- 1980 Hamburg arson attack
- 1984 Duisburg arson attack
- 1992 Mölln arson attack
