= 1984 Duisburg arson attack =

Arson attack in Germany

- Location: Duisburg, North Rhine-Westphalia, Germany
- Date: 26 August 1984
- Attack type: Arson
- Deaths: 7 (including 4 children)
- Injuries: 25
- Perpetrator: Evelin D.
- Motive: disputed

The Duisburg arson attack was an arson attack on a house in Duisburg, Germany in 1984. It was the first arson attack on a Turkish migrant family in Duisburg and Germany.

== Background ==
In the 1980s, there was several attacks on migrants in Germany.

== Attack ==
The fire occurred between 26 and 27 August 1984 at around midnight in the borough Wanheimerort. It was reported in local and regional media that the fire spread quickly throughout the building from the ground floor through the wooden staircase of the old building. Seven members of the Satır family died, and 23 people were wounded. Only the two daughters of the family managed to flee by jumping out of the window, and were seriously injured. The father Ramazan Satır, who was not at the house, was unharmed.

== Victims ==
The victims were Döndü Satır, (40), Zeliha and Rasim Turhan (18) and their son Tarık Turhan (1 month), Çiğdem Satır (7), Ümit Satır (5) and Songül Satır (4). The family was originally from Adana, Turkey, and they were buried in the village of Köprülü in Ceyhan.

== Perpetrator ==
The case was closed in 1996 when Evelin D. was identified as the perpetrator, who had turned herself in to police in 1994, and admitted to a series of arsons, spanning over 10 years. She was 24 years old at the time of the arson and also the perpetrator of another previous attack in Duisburg in 1993 on a migrant family. In total, she was linked to 50 arson cases. She was a pyromaniac, which caused the court to drop the possibility of the attacks being racially motivated. However the victims and activist organizations have claimed that the attack was caused by xenophobia. D. died of natural causes while still detained at a psychiatric facility in 2010.

== In popular culture ==
The short film Made in Germany 3 was inspired by the event. The "Initiative Duisburg 1984" organization founded in 2018 has the aim to bring the forgotten arson attack back into the public consciousness. The attack was commemorated in 2019, and a podcast was made with the survivors.

== See also ==
- 1980 Hamburg arson attack
- 1992 Mölln arson attack
- 1993 Sollingen arson attack
- 2024 Solingen arson attack
