= Conscription in Vietnam =

Compulsory military service in Vietnam

Conscription in Vietnam has existed since 1975 and requires male citizens between the ages of 18 and 25 (18 to 27 for those who attend colleges or universities) to perform compulsory military service. Women are not required to perform military service, but they may voluntarily join. In addition, men who are students can apply for postponements and avoid conscription altogether once they turn 28.

== General regulations ==
According to Article 4 of the Military Service Law, 2015 (effective from 1 January 2016):

1. Military service is a glorious duty of citizens serving in the People's Army of Vietnam. Performing military service includes active duty service and service in the reserve ranks of the Army.
2. Citizens of military service age, regardless of ethnicity, social class, religion or belief, education level, occupation, or place of residence, must perform military service in accordance with regulations of the law.
3. Citizens serving in the Vietnam Coast Guard and joining the Vietnam People's Public Security are considered to have performed active military service.
4. Citizens falling into one of the following cases are recognized to have finished active military service in peacetime:

The core militia and self-defense force has completed the obligation to join the militia and self-defense force, of which at least 12 months have been on the duty of standing militia and self-defense force;
Complete the task of participating in the Commune Police continuously for full 36 months or more;
Cadres, civil servants, public employees, university graduates or higher who have been trained and conferred the rank of reserve officer;
Young people who have graduated from universities, colleges or intermediate schools volunteer to serve at the economic – defense delegation for full 24 months or more according to the scheme decided by the Prime Minister;
Citizens who have served in Coast Guard for 24 months or longer.

== Service length ==
The de jure length of compulsory military service in Vietnam is 2 years. Unlike in South Korea and other countries or territories with compulsory military service, Vietnam have a fixed enlistment date on February or March every year. The de facto period usually ends before Tết two years after enlistment (e.g. if one's military service started in February 2020 (after Tết 2020), they will be discharged before Tết 2022).

In some cases, the Minister of the Ministry of Defence may decide to extend the active service period of non-commissioned officers and soldiers, but not exceeding 6 months:

- To ensure combat readiness;
- In the process of preventing and combating natural disasters, epidemics, search and rescue.

== Exemptions ==
These are exempt from military service:

- People with disabilities
- People with serious illnesses
- Mentally ill people
- People with chronic diseases

== Allowances ==
=== 2026 ===
Types	Allowance coefficient	Allowance level per month
Private	0.4	VND 936,000
Private first-class	0.45	VND 1,053,000
Corporal	0.5	VND 1,170,000
Sergeant	0.6	VND 1,404,000
Sergeant Major	0.7	VND 1,638,000

== Controversies ==
=== Hazing and beating ===
==== Unsuspicious cases ====
- 20 January 2004 – Private first-class Trần Văn Đại was attacked by six men from the Guards platoon of the 209th Regiment, 312th Division, 1st Corps.
- November 2020 – Từ Văn Nghĩa, Vương Phước Tự, Nguyễn Hữu Nghĩa and Lê Văn Vĩnh, along with some other soldiers, left the barracks without permission to drink alcohol. When they were discovered by their superiors and asked to disperse and return to the barracks, these soldiers beat their superiors and comrades.

==== Unusual or suspected unusual cases ====
Since the effective of the Military Service Law 2015 (effective since 2016), there have been many deaths of draftees which their families or acquittances suspected them to be unusual:

Name	Ethnicity	Death date	Age	Place	Notes
Lê Công Đức	Kinh	24 October 2016	21	Brigade 147 – 1st Regional Command (Quảng Yên, Quảng Ninh province)	Claimed to be a suicide.
Dương Hiển Thanh Vinh	Kinh	9 June 2018	19	Battalion 9, Company 1, Army Officer School 2 (Biên Hòa, Đồng Nai province)	Claimed to be a suicide.
Nguyễn Quốc Thái	Kinh	24 February 2019	24	Chợ Mới District, An Giang Province	Claimed to be drowning.
Phạm Đình Hưng	Kinh	9 April 2019	23	Artillery Brigade 572, 5th Military Region (Bình Định province)	Claimed to be a suicide.
Phạm Minh Huy	Kinh	18 August 2019	19	Air Defense Brigade 77 (152 Nguyễn Oanh Street, Gò Vấp District, Ho Chi Minh City)	After asking personnel of the brigade, an officer stated that Huy fell from the 3rd floor, but the person on duty with Huy said that Huy was on the 1st floor, then saw that Huy had gone to the toilet for 10 minutes and had not returned, and another said Huy jumped from the 2nd floor.
Huỳnh Trung	Khmer	28 November 2019	19	Cần Thơ	Claimed to be a suicide.
Trần Đức Đô	Kinh	28 June 2021	19	Battalion 4, Company 14, 1st Military Region Military School (Phú Bình District, Thái Nguyên province)	Do's family said that on 25 June 2021, they received a call from Do saying that his commander attacked him. At the same time, they required district and provincial authorities as well as the central government to handle this case. This was concluded to be a suicide by hanging.
Nguyễn Văn Thiên	Kinh	29 November 2021	23	Infantry Battalion 50, Infantry Regiment 991 (Đức Cơ District, Gia Lai province)	First claimed to be intracerebral hemorrhage. The local government is said to enforce his family to bury him if his family refuses. On 5 January 2022, three were prosecuted in this case.
Hoàng Bá Mạnh	Kinh	20 December 2021	20	Hải Dương province	Suspected to be assault.
Lý Văn Phương	Hmong	10 June 2022	22	Army Officer School 1 (Quang Phuc village, Yen Bai commune, Ba Vi district, Hanoi)	Claimed to be drowning.
Nguyễn Văn Hào	Kinh	5 July 2023	19	Battalion 97, Regiment 1, 675th Brigade is part of the Artillery Corps.(Tông Bạt commune, Ba Vì district, Hanoi)	Claimed to be drowning.
