= 1993 Solingen arson attack =

Neo-Nazi arson attack on Turkish home in Solingen

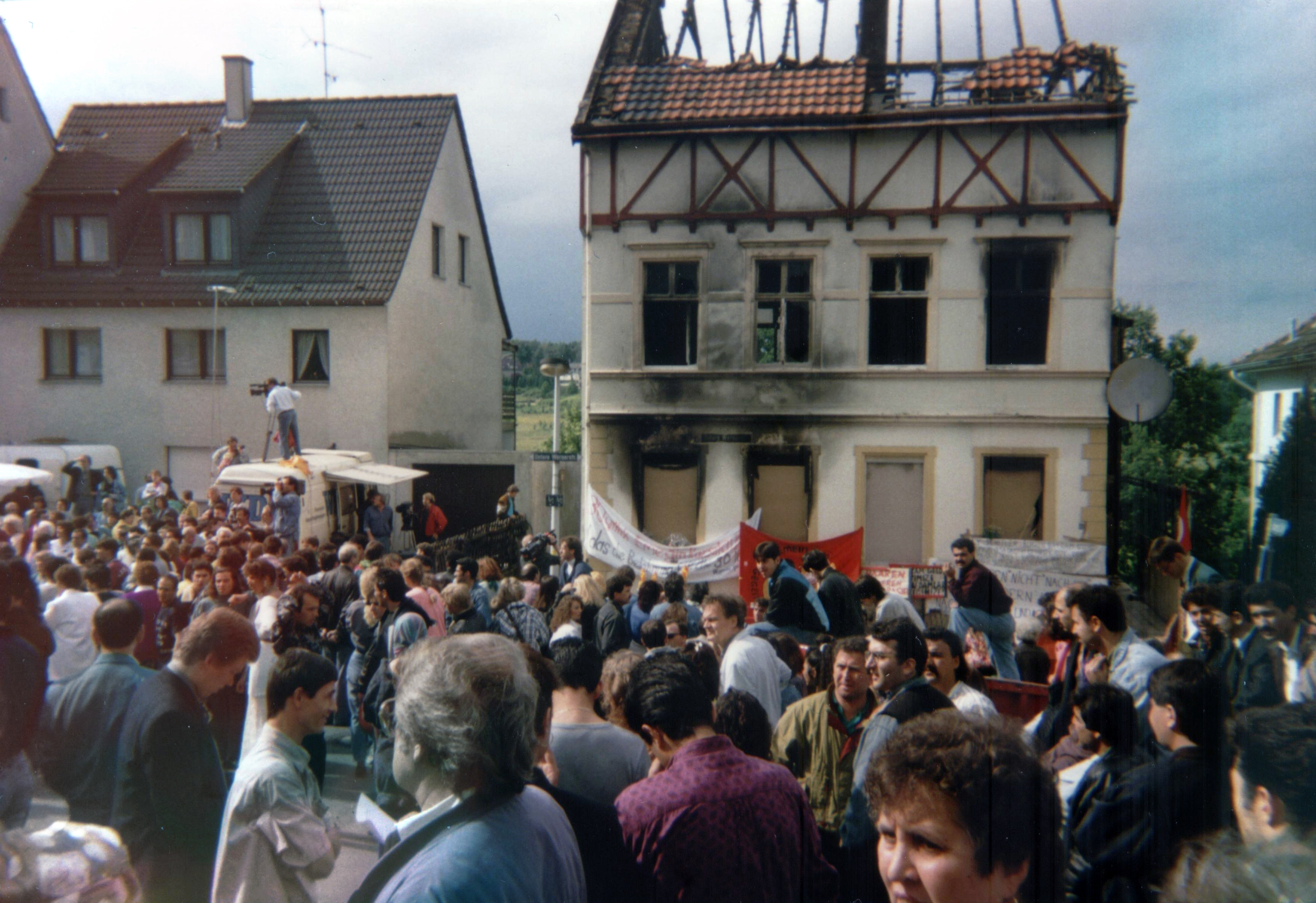
- Demonstration of Germans and Turks in front of the arson house

- Solingen (North Rhine-Westphalia) Solingen (Germany)
- Location: 51°11′2.5″N 7°5′23.7″E; Solingen, North Rhine-Westphalia, Germany
- Date: 28 May 1993 (UTC+1)
- Attack type: Arson, hate crime
- Weapon: Gasoline
- Deaths: 5
- Injuries: 14
- Perpetrator: four Neo-Nazi skinheads
- Motive: Anti-immigration, Racism, Right-wing extremism, Anti-Turkish sentiment, anti-Muslim sentiment

The Solingen arson attack (German: Solinger Brandanschlag) was one of the most severe instances of racist violence in modern Germany. On the night of 28–29 May 1993, four young German men (ages 16–23) belonging to the far right skinhead scene, with neo-Nazi ties, set fire to the house of a large Turkish family in the city of Solingen, in the state of North Rhine-Westphalia, Germany. Three girls and two women died; fourteen other family members, including several children, were injured, some of them severely. The attack led to violent protests by Turkish diaspora members in several German cities and to large demonstrations of other Germans (of non-Turkish descent) expressing solidarity with the Turkish victims. In October 1995, the perpetrators were convicted of arson and murder and given prison sentences between 10 and 15 years. The convictions were upheld on appeal.

== Background ==
In the early 1990s after German reunification, foreigners and especially asylum seekers were very controversial in Germany. The CDU party and the tabloid newspaper Bild Zeitung were the main forces calling for limiting their numbers.

Several instances of anti-foreigner hate crime preceded the Solingen attack. In December 1988, a German extreme-right militant, Josef Seller, set fire to the "Habermeier Haus" building in Schwandorf, Bavaria, killing the Turkish couple Fatma and Osman Can, together with their son Mehmet. The arson attack also took the life of a German citizen, Jürgen Hübner. In September 1991, violent disturbances in Hoyerswerda forced the evacuation of an asylum seeker's hostel. During the three-day riot of Rostock-Lichtenhagen in August 1992, several thousand people surrounded a high-rise building and watched approvingly while militants threw Molotov cocktails. The Vietnamese inhabitants barely managed to survive by fleeing to the roof. In November 1992, an arson in Mölln perpetrated by right-wing youth killed three Turks.

In December 1992, large demonstrations protesting against xenophobia ("Ausländerhass") took place all over Germany, with over 700,000 participants. Several Neo-Nazi groups were outlawed by the end of 1992.

On 26 May 1993, three days before the attack, the German Bundestag had resolved to change the German constitution (the Grundgesetz) to limit the numbers of asylum seekers. Previously, the constitution had granted every political refugee in the world a direct right to refugee status in Germany.

The Solingen attack, with five people killed, was the most severe case of anti-foreigner violence in Germany at that time. One week later, an arson attack on a house in Frankfurt am Main, with 34 foreigners inside, was detected early and there were no deaths. A case of arson in an asylum seeker's hostel in Lübeck in 1996 in which 10 people died was never solved. As of 2008 a total of 135 foreigners have died in Germany as a result of similar xenophobic violence.

== Events ==
According to the police report, fire broke out at the entrance of the house Untere Wernerstraße 81 at 1:38 am on 29 May 1993. The fire had been set with gasoline. Mevlüde Genç, 50 years old at the time and the oldest member of the family, was able to climb out of a window and alert neighbors. She lost two daughters, two granddaughters and a niece that night.

Fire fighters arrived after five minutes, but it was too late. Gürsün İnce, 27 years old, jumped out of a window and died. Her four-year-old daughter, whom she had held in her arms, survived. The girls Hatice Genç (18 years old), Gülistan Öztürk (12 years old), Hülya Genç (9 years old) and Saime Genç (4 years old) died in the flames. Bekir Genç, 15 years old, jumped burning out of a window; he survived with severe injuries. A six-month-old infant and a three-year-old child suffered life-threatening injuries.

== Defendants ==
The defendants were:

- Felix Köhnen, a 16-year-old student at the time of the crime. His father was a doctor active in the peace movement and his mother an architect active in environmentalist causes. There were reports that Felix fell into right-wing circles because he felt unable to cope with the academic expectations of his parents.
- Christian Reher, a 16-year-old student who grew up in children's homes. He lived close to the arson house and was the first to be arrested. He had previously distributed leaflets expressing his hatred of foreigners.
- Christian Buchholz, 19 years old, working odd jobs. He was the son of a middle-class workman. His diary contained anti-foreigner writings.
- Markus Gartmann, 23 years old, welfare recipient. As a youth, he was reportedly a loner. He was a member of the nationalist DVU party.

All of them were members of the far right skinhead scene of Solingen and exercised together in a martial arts school. This school was later revealed to be run by an informant of the North Rhine-Westphalia domestic intelligence agency (the Verfassungsschutz).

== Trials ==
The trial, before five judges of Düsseldorf's Higher Regional Court, began in April 1994. Kohnen, Reher and Buchholz were charged as minors (limiting the maximal penalty to 10 years in prison), while Gartmann was charged as an adult. The prosecutors claimed hatred of foreigners as motive.

Gartmann had confessed to police and he later confessed again before a magistrate with his lawyer present. He also apologized to the victims. According to the confession, Gartmann, Kohnen and Buchholz had clashed with foreigners at a party that night, met up with Reher and then, while drunk, decided to "frighten" some Turks. Towards the end of the trial, Gartmann withdrew his confession, claiming that it had been issued under duress and that he had been threatened with having to share a cell with Turks. Interviewed in prison four months after the verdict, he explained that he had given a false confession because police had convinced him that that was the only way to avoid a sentence of life in prison.

Reher also confessed, but changed his story repeatedly, in the end claiming that he had acted alone. Kohnen and Buchholz denied any involvement.

No hard evidence was found linking the defendants to the crime, in part because the police had treated the crime scene in a sloppy manner. Witnesses could not clarify the events.

In October 1995, the four defendants were found guilty of murder, attempted murder and arson. The three defendants charged as minors received the maximum sentence of 10 years in prison and Gartmann was sentenced to 15 years in prison. The Federal Court of Justice of Germany confirmed the convictions on appeal in 1997. The Turkish family sued for civil damages and won. They received about 270,000 DM and a monthly pension for one severely burned victim.

== Aftermath ==
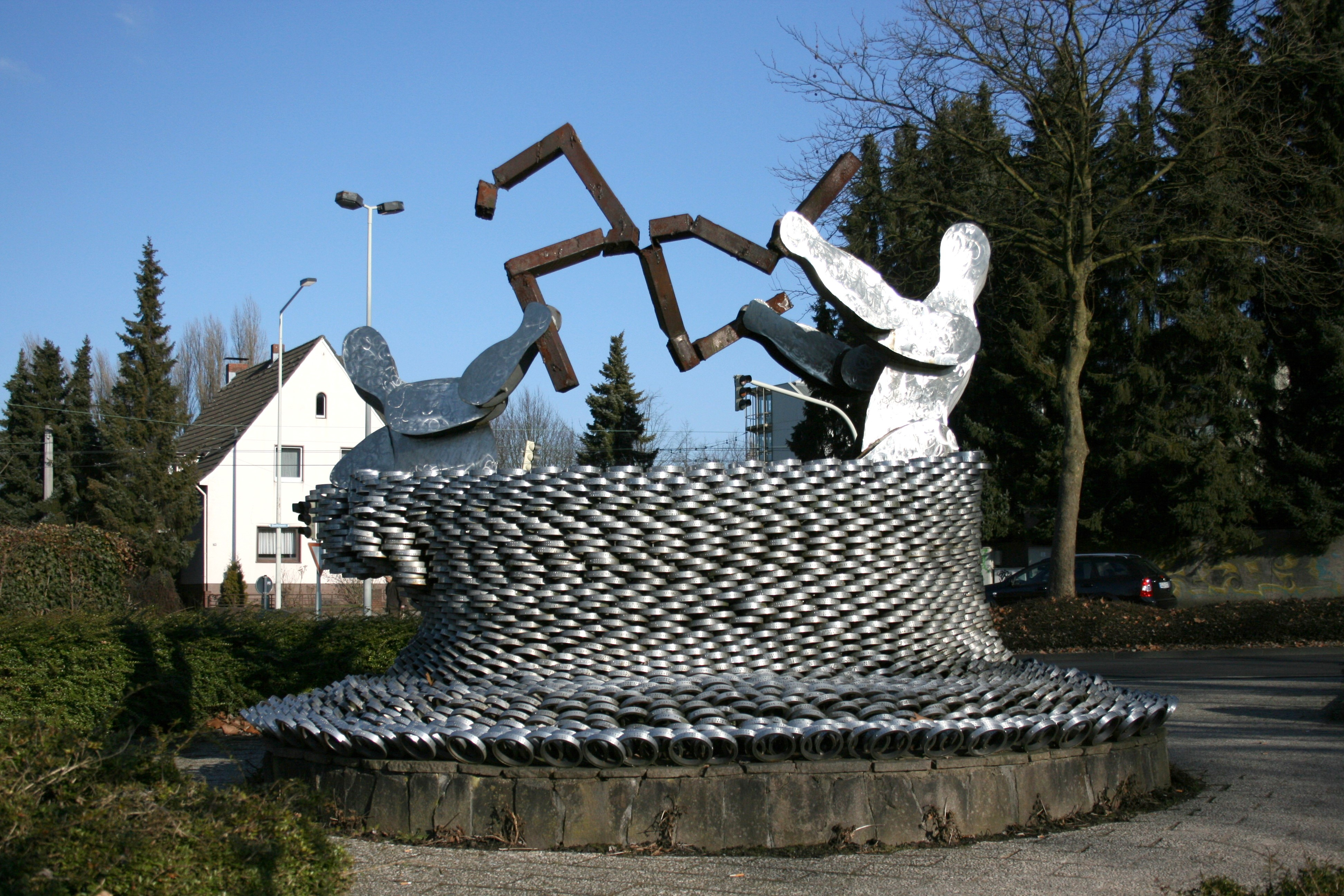
Memorial in front of the Mildred-Scheel-Schule

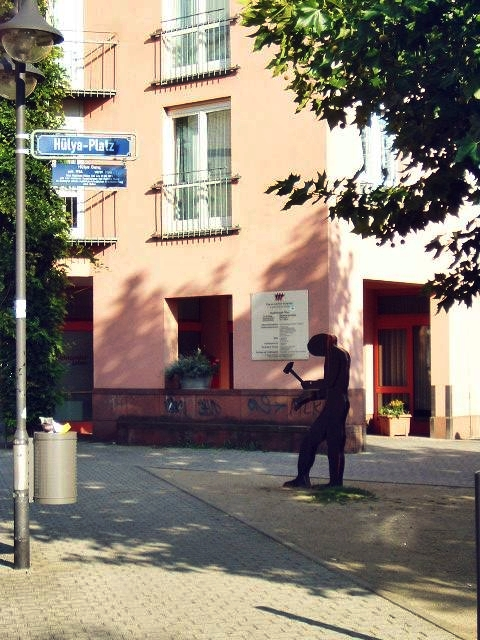
Hülyaplatz in Frankfurt-Bockenheim

The memorial services were attended by several high-ranking German officials, with President Richard von Weizsäcker giving the first speech. Chancellor Helmut Kohl was criticized for not visiting Solingen nor attending the memorial or burial services; he had denounced what he called "Beileidstourismus" ("condolence tourism") of other politicians.

A memorial to commemorate the event was unveiled one year after the attack, in front of the Mildred-Scheel-Schule, a school that Hatice Genç had attended. It shows two large metal figures ripping apart a swastika, surrounded by a large number of rings, each sponsored by an individual. Initially the city had agreed to a monument in the very center of the city, but then reneged, citing concerns that "social peace" might be jeopardized. The location of the arson at Untere Wernerstraße Nr. 81 is marked by five chestnut trees and a plaque. In Frankfurt-Bockenheim the Hülyaplatz commemorates the events with a statue of a man hammering at a swastika.

In 1996 the German government presented Mevlüde Genç with the Bundesverdienstkreuz am Band because she went on to advocate understanding and friendship between Turks and Germans after the attack. In 2008 Germany instituted the Genç prize in her name to honor people who work for understanding and integration. One of the recipients was Kamil Kaplan, a Turk who in February 2008 had lost his wife, two daughters and his mother in a fire catastrophe in Ludwigshafen in which a total of nine people had died; right-wing arson had initially been suspected, but the case was later found to have been an accident. Kaplan, like Mevlüde Genç, had called for peaceful cooperation between Turks and Germans. In 2012, Mevlüde Genc was nominated by the CDU state party to be a member of the 15th Federal Convention to elect the next German President.

Two of the perpetrators were released early because of good behavior. In September 2005, another perpetrator, Christian Reher, was sent to four months in prison for having used the Hitler salute on two occasions.

As of 2008, the surviving victims still live in Solingen, in a house built with donations and insurance money, protected by cameras and special fire windows.

== See also ==
- 2024 Solingen arson attack
- 2024 Solingen stabbing
- Turks in Germany
- 1980 Hamburg arson attack
- 1984 Duisburg arson attack
- 1992 Mölln arson attack
- Neo-Nazism
- Rostock-Lichtenhagen riot
- Murder of Marwa El-Sherbini
- 2009 Vítkov arson attack
- National Socialist Underground
- Hanau shootings

== Sources ==
- Yvonne Dobrodziej: Der Solinger Brandanschlag – 10 Jahre danach. Documentary film.
- Metin Gür, Alaverdi Turhan: Die Solingen-Akte. Patmos Verlag, Düsseldorf 1996, ISBN 3-491-72352-3
