= Manfred Roeder =

German lawyer and neo-Nazi terrorist (1929–2014)

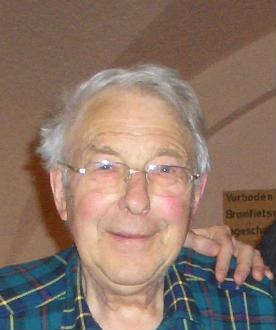
- Roeder in 2009
- Born: Manfred Richard Kurt Roeder; 6 February 1929; Berlin, Free State of Prussia, Weimar Republic
- Died: 30 July 2014 (aged 85); Neukirchen, Hesse, Germany
- Status: Deceased
- Criminal charges: Volksverhetzung; Terrorism

Manfred Richard Kurt Roeder (6 February 1929 – 30 July 2014) was a German lawyer and neo-Nazi terrorist. Roeder, a Holocaust denier, was described as "one of West Germany's most important neo-Nazis", known for his open support of Nazi Germany and being responsible for a series of bombings targeting foreigners and Holocaust exhibits, most notably the 1980 Hamburg arson attack. He is considered an early representative of the Reichsbürger movement.

== Early life ==
Roeder was born in Berlin-Friedenau to an Evangelical family. His father was an engineer and later a SA-Obersturmführer. In 1939, Roeder's father sent him to the National Political Institute of Education in Plön. After a confrontation with the school's director, Roeder was sent to a Heimschule run by the SS in 1943.

In January 1945, Roeder enlisted for service in the Volkssturm and participated in the Battle of Berlin before his unit surrendered on 30 April to avoid capture by the Red Army. In 1947, he finished his Abitur at Lilienthal-Gymnasium. Initially intending to become a theatre critic, Roeder studied German studies and philosophy for two semesters in Berlin before switching to legal science at the University of Münster and University of Bonn. During his student years, he joined the Evangelical Student Congregation and became active with Moral Re-Armament (MRA) in 1950. Roeder undertook his legal clerkship at Hamm Higher Regional Court on 1 September 1954, but dropped out of his training to work freelance for MRA. In December 1961, he continued his studies and after completion of his second state exam, he was employed as a paralegal at US-Headquarters Command in Berlin-Dahlem between June 1966 and July 1969. He received his lawyer's licence on 23 January 1967.

== Career ==
=== Early career ===
In 1965, Roeder joined the CDU and was active in an Evangelical church council. In 1967, he founded Demokratische Initiative, intended as a conservative counter-movement to the left-wing Außerparlamentarische Opposition. In 1969, he moved to Bensheim, where he joined Reichenberg Fellowship. He married his wife Gertrud, the daughter of his former Napola school principal, the same year.

Roeder's radical right-wing ideology was first noted by the East German Stasi in 1966, but an effort to monitor him was abandoned by the beginning of the 1970s, though a detailed building plan of his residence remained in the archives.

In 1970, Roeder left the CDU and along with six others, he founded "Bürgerinitiative gegen moralische und politische Anarchie", later shortened to "Deutsche Bürgerinitiative". The movement's initial focus was opposition to pornography, protesting at erotic conventions, defacing sex work ads and writing petitions against pornographic magazines.

=== Far-right activism ===
By June 1971, his rhetoric shifted towards antisemitic and racist content and on 28 November 1970, Roeder, his wife, and six of his followers founded the Deutsche Bürgerinitiative ("German Citizens' Initiative"), as a registered association. He forged ties with the far-right political scene in Germany, such as the NPD, and abroad, including the Ku Klux Klan. Media labelled Roeder a "politclown" for his far-fetched ventures, which included writing letters to foreign leaders such as Ugandan dictator Idi Amin, for help in "restoring the Reich", or Brazilian president Ernesto Geisel, to plead for the release of detained Nazi war criminal Gustav Wagner, with the reason as "to not sully [his] soldier's honor". With fellow Holocaust denier and ex-SS officer Thies Christophersen, Roeder also founded two self-proclaimed "Reichstags" in Regensburg and Flensburg.

Roeder moved to Schwarzenborn, where he lived for the remainder of his life at a compound he named the "Reichshof". He held meetings with other members of the Völkisch movement at the property in the decades that followed. Also in 1971, Roeder briefly served as the attorney of Rudolf Hess and made public efforts to have him released from prison until Hess' suicide in 1987.

By 1974, Roeder had begun to believe in the conspiracy theory that West Germany's constitution was invalid, as the German Reich had never ceased to exist. To affirm his belief, he contacted Karl Dönitz, the last leader of Nazi Germany. Dönitz regarded Roeder's ideas as ridiculous, and firmly stated that he no longer considered himself President of Germany. However, Roeder saw this as a resignation declaration and declared himself Dönitz's successor as the "Reichsverweser" (i.e. new German head of state) and announced a new government in form of the "Freiheitsbewegung Deutsches Reich" (Freedom Movement of the German Reich). Researcher Tobias Ginsburg argued that this move probably made Roeder the first Reichsbürger to claim a high-ranking title for himself. His activities as conspiracy theorist ultimately led Roeder to become a militant activist and eventually outright terrorist.

=== Criminal charges and terror campaign ===
Roeder's career was marked by an abundance of criminal charges, including resistance against state authority, and battery. In January 1980, seeking to escape charges, Roeder sought refuge in Lebanon, where he made contact with the Palestinian Liberation Organization, who declined offers at cooperation. He then attempted to file for asylum in Iran, as he admired Ruhollah Khomeini for his imposition of strict traditonalist morality. He lived in the country for less than a month, but left on 13 February 1980 due to lack of funds and a language barrier; Roeder's asylum request was denied shortly after his departure by Iranian authorities. Back in Germany, Roeder sent out death threat letters containing the names of several anti-Nazi resistance figures, including Willy Brandt, Beate Klarsfeld, Theo Sommer, Heinz Galinski, and Marion Gräfin Dönhoff, as well as politicians who had opposed him like Franz Josef Strauß. For his involvement with the Ayatollah, Roeder was nicknamed the "Brown Khomeini" by his followers.

From February to August 1980, the Deutsche Aktionsgruppen ("German Action Groups"), a neo-Nazi organisation founded by Roeder, carried out bombings on buildings that housed foreign workers and asylum seekers, as well as Holocaust memorial sites. In August 1980, the Deutsche Aktionsgruppen attacked a refugee accommodation in Hamburg with molotov cocktails, killing two Vietnamese boat people. Within the following month, the group effectively disbanded following the arrest of all its known members. Because of his integral role in a terrorist organisation Roeder was sentenced to 13 years in prison in 1982. Roeder was released in 1990, after serving two-thirds of his sentence, for good behaviour and a perceived social rehabilitation.

=== Later life ===
In 1997, the British current affairs program Panorama reported that in 1994, Roeder had appeared, by invitation, as a speaker at the Bundeswehr Führungsakademie, the general staff college of German military officers. This scandal, as well as the fact that Roeder had received financial donations from the military, led to the firing of the academy's commander and the instatement of Rear-Admiral Rudolf Lange as his replacement, with the goal of restoring the good reputation of the academy. Chief of Staff Norbert Schwarzer claimed that he was unaware of Roeder's status as a neo-Nazi and that Roeder had been recommended to him by an employee of the academy.

In 1996, Roeder, together with other far-right extremists, perpetrated an attack on an exhibition in Erfurt detailing the role of the Wehrmacht in Nazi Germany, for which he was charged with property damage and fined DM-4,500. The trial was attended by several of his supporters, including Uwe Böhnhardt and Uwe Mundlos, who later created the National Socialist Underground militant group which perpetrated several xenophobic murders between 2001 and 2010.

In 1997, Roeder stood as the candidate of the far-right NPD in Stralsund in Mecklenburg-Vorpommern during the parliamentary elections, promoting himself as "Chancellor alternative 1998", but was unsuccessful.

After being sentenced to prison by the state courts of Schwerin and Rostock for Volksverhetzung (incitement to hatred) and for other crimes, he was given a further ten months in September 2004 by the state court of Frankfurt for contempt of the state. In February 2005, a further sentencing for the same crime was passed by the court of Schwalmstadt. On 12 May 2005, he began a prison sentence in Gießen, but he was released shortly after on health grounds.

== Death ==
Roeder died on 30 July 2014 at the age of 85. A year before his death, Roeder's house was bought by the daughter of Australian Holocaust denier Michèle Renouf and remained in use as a neo-Nazi meeting grounds as late as 2018.

== Writings (excerpt) ==
- Newsletter from Manfred Roeder from the Dieburg prison (2003)
