= 1992 Mölln arson attack =

Neo-nazi terror attack on a Turkish family in Germany

- Mölln (Schleswig-Holstein) Mölln (Germany)
- Location: 53°37′37″N 10°41′05″E; Mölln, Schleswig-Holstein, Germany
- Date: 22 November 1992 (UTC+1)
- Attack type: Arson
- Deaths: 3
- Injuries: 9
- Perpetrators: Michael Peters and Lars Christiansen
- Motive: Anti-immigration; Anti-Turkish sentiment Islamophobia

The Mölln arson attack (German: Brandanschlag in Mölln) was the first fatal case of far-right extremists setting fire to migrants' homes in post-reunification Germany, and one of the earliest cases of right-wing terrorism in the country's post-unification history. On the night of 22 November 1992, two neo-Nazis set fire to the two houses of Turkish families in Mölln, in Schleswig-Holstein, Germany. Three people were killed and nine injured.

== Background ==
The fall of the Berlin Wall in 1989 and the subsequent reunification of Germany were followed by a sharp rise in racist violence, particularly against Turkish-Germans. A series of arson attacks, bombings, and shootings targeted members of the Turkish community in their homes, cultural centres, and businesses. The violence appeared to be driven by a mix of ethnic nationalism and a legal framework that differentiated citizenship and rights on the basis of ethnicity. Several of these attacks, including the 1992 Mölln arson attack, resulted in multiple deaths and severe injuries.

== Attack ==
On the night of 22 November 1992, Mölln, Schleswig-Holstein two right-wing extremists, 25-year-old Michael Peters and 19-year-old Lars Christiansen (Note: Their names were initially protected under German law but are no longer hidden.) firebombed two houses inhabited by the Turkish Arslan and Yılmaz families.

Local neighbours witnessed people jumping out of windows as their homes were set ablaze. The Yılmaz family was the first to be evacuated, but the Arslans' staircase and halls were blocked by the fire. 7-year old Ibrahim Arslan was wrapped in damp towels by his grandfather as he was rushed to the outside.

The town's fire department received an anonymous call shortly after midnight reporting that an apartment building in the city’s center, where several foreign families lived, was on fire. The caller ended his call with the words “Heil Hitler.” While the response by police and firemen were as fast as possible, the damage had been done by the time they arrived.

Two girls, 14-year-old Ayşe Yılmaz and 10-year-old Yeliz Arslan and their 51-year-old grandmother Bahide Arslan died in the flames. Nine others, including a 9-month-old baby were seriously injured.

== Aftermath ==
To protest the attack, several thousand people marched quietly in Berlin and Hamburg. Mölln's mayor, Joachim Doerfler, headed a silent procession of several hundred residents.

Peters and Christiansen were found guilty by German courts and sentenced to life imprisonment and nine years imprisonment under juvenile law respectively. Peters was released on parole after 15 years in 2007, around the anniversary of the murders. Since his release, Christiansen has denied the extent of his involvement.

The murders scared the German public, especially the Turkish minority, of the possibility of future attacks.

== In popular culture ==
In 2025, a documentary based on letters of survivors of the attack titled The Moelln Letters directed by Martina Priessner was selected in the Panorama at the 75th Berlin International Film Festival and premiered in February.

== See also ==
- 1980 Hamburg arson attack
- 1984 Duisburg arson attack
- 1993 Solingen arson attack
