= List of political parties in Hungary =

This article lists political parties in Hungary. Hungary has a multi-party system since it gained independence following the Revolutions of 1989. Since 2026, the political landscape has been dominated by two major parties: the Tisza Party which has a supermajority in the National Assembly, and the opposition Fidesz–KDNP alliance, which consists of the Fidesz – Hungarian Civic Alliance and the Christian Democratic People's Party (KDNP).

Political parties have been a core part of Hungarian politics since the Hungarian Reform Era and the long debate leading up to the Hungarian Revolution of 1848, with liberals being represented by the Opposition Party and conservatives being represented by the Conservative Party. Political parties continued to play a role in Hungarian politics following the Kiegyezés of 1867, especially among Hungarian liberal nationalists. Under the authoritarian regency of the Horthy era, political parties were still allowed, although the Unity Party came to act as the party of power under early Hungarian fascism with support from the Hungarian nobility. Following Operation Panzerfaust, the only legal political party in Hungary was the pro-Nazi and "Hungarist" Arrow Cross Party, which perpetrated the Holocaust in Hungary.

Following the Second World War, a brief period of multi-party democracy returned to Hungary, albeit under Soviet occupation. With Soviet aid and utilizing salami tactics, the Hungarian Communist Party and its Left Bloc coalition seized power in the 1947 "blue ballot" election. In 1948, the Hungarian Communist Party rebranded as the Hungarian Working People's Party, or MDP for short, and in 1949 wrote a constitution which established a Stalinist one-party dictatorship. Following the Hungarian Revolution of 1956, the MDP reorganized as the Hungarian Socialist Workers' Party, or MSZMP for short, as part of Hungary's broader program of de-Stalinization.

In 1989, various different political parties participated in the Hungarian Round Table Talks and demonstrations against communist rule. Most of the political parties of Hungary today are in some way descended from these political parties, such as Fidesz and its outgrowth, the Tisza Party. The Democratic Coalition is an outgrowth of the Hungarian Socialist Party, which itself is an outgrowth of the reformist wing of the MSZMP. With growing opposition to the early liberal governments in Hungary and the rise of Viktor Orbán, far-right political movements began to emerge, culminating in the founding of Jobbik, which in 2018 became the largest opposition force in Hungary. However, Jobbik started to brand itself as a moderate conservative party to court mainstream voters, leading hardliners to break away and form the current main far-right party in Hungary, Our Homeland Movement; the opposition, meanwhile, formed the United for Hungary coalition, which was headed by the Democratic Coalition and became the largest opposition party in 2022.

== Active parties ==
=== Parties represented in the National Assembly and/or European Parliament ===
Name	Abbr.	Leader	Ideology	Political position	MPs	MEPs	EP group
Tisza Party; TISZA – Tisztelet és Szabadság Párt	TISZA	Péter Magyar	Conservatism; Populism; Pro-Europeanism	Centre-right	141 / 199	7 / 21	EPP
Fidesz – Hungarian Civic Alliance; Fidesz – Magyar Polgári Szövetség	Fidesz	Viktor Orban	National conservatism; Right-wing populism; Christian nationalism	Right-wing to far-right	44 / 199	10 / 21	PfE
Christian Democratic People's Party; Kereszténydemokrata Néppárt	KDNP	Zsolt Semjén	Christian right; National conservatism; Social conservatism	Far-right	8 / 199	1 / 21	PfE
Our Homeland Movement; Mi Hazánk Mozgalom	MH	László Toroczkai	National conservatism; Hungarian irredentism; Neo-fascism	Far-right	6 / 199	1 / 21	ESN
Democratic Coalition; Demokratikus Koalíció	DK	László Varju	Social democracy; Social liberalism	Centre-left	0 / 199	2 / 21	S&D

=== Minor parties ===
Name	Abbr.	Leader	Ideology	Political position	EP group
Hungarian Socialist Party; Magyar Szocialista Párt	MSZP	Imre Komjáthi	Social democracy; Pro-Europeanism	Centre-left to left-wing	S&D
Dialogue – The Greens' Party; Párbeszéd – A Zöldek Pártja	PZ	Rebeka Szabó; Richárd Barabás	Green politics; Pro-Europeanism	Centre-left to left-wing	Greens/EFA
Momentum Movement; Momentum Mozgalom	MoMo	Kincső Szilas	Liberalism; Pro-Europeanism	Centre	RE
Movement for a Better Hungary; Jobbik Magyarországért Mozgalom	Jobbik	Béla Adorján	Conservatism; Hungarian nationalism	Right-wing	NI
LMP – Hungary's Green Party; LMP – Magyarország Zöld Pártja	LMP	Péter Ungár; Katalin Szabó-Kellner	Green liberalism; Syncretic politics	Centre to centre-left	Greens/EFA
On the People's Side; A Nép Pártján	NP	Péter Jakab	Populism; Pro-Europeanism	Centre-right	—N/a
National Self-Government of Germans in Hungary; Magyarországi Németek Országos Önkormányzata	MNOÖ	Ibolya Hock-Englender	German minority interests	Centre-right	—N/a
National Self-Government of Romas; Magyarországi Romák Országos Önkormányzata	MROÖ	Mihály Dancs	Romani minority interests	Centre-right	—N/a
ReforMers; ReforMerek	ReforMerek	Andrea Varga-Damm	Christian democracy; Conservative liberalism	Centre-right to right-wing	
Yes Solidarity for Hungary Movement; Igen Szolidaritás Magyarországért Mozgalom	ISZOMM	Tibor Szanyi	Anti-capitalism; Kádárism; Democratic socialism	Left-wing to Far-left	
Hungarian Liberal Party; Magyar Liberális Párt	Liberálisok	Anett Bősz	Liberalism; Pro-Europeanism	Centre to centre-left	
Huxit Party; Huxit Párt	VP	János Volner	National conservatism; Euroscepticism	Right-wing	
Everybody's Hungary People's Party; Mindenki Magyarországa Néppárt	MMN	Péter Márki-Zay	Christian democracy; Pro-Europeanism	Centre-right	
Hungarian Workers' Party; Magyar Munkáspárt	Munkáspárt	Gyula Thürmer	Marxism-Leninism; Kádárism; Euroscepticism	Far-left	
Social Democratic Party of Hungary; Magyarországi Szociáldemokrata Párt	MSZDP	László Andráska	Social democracy	Centre-left to left-wing	
Hungarian Two Tailed Dog Party; Magyar Kétfarkú Kutyapárt	MKKP	Gergely Kovács	Joke party; Absurdism; Satire		
Workers' Party of Hungary 2006 – European Left; Magyarországi Munkáspárt 2006 - Európai Baloldal	Európai Baloldal	Attila Vajnai	Marxism; Eurocommunism	Left-wing	
Motherland Party; A Haza Pártja	HP	Árpád Kásler	Social conservatism; Soft Euroscepticism	Centre	
Civil Movement; Civil Mozgalom	CM	Mária Seres(hu)	Third Way	Centre-right	
Hungarian Environmentalists' Party; Magyar Környezetvédők Pártja	ZÖLDEK	Zoltán Medveczki	Green conservatism	Right-wing	
Solution Movement; Megoldás Mozgalom	MEMO	Dániel Bogó	Digitalization	Centre	
Party of Normal Life; Normális Élet Pártja	NÉP	Ottó Stekler	Vaccine hesitancy	Centre	
Socialists and Democrats; Szocialisták és Demokraták		Attila Mesterházy	Social democracy; Pro-Europeanism	Centre-left	
Prayer - Our Party; IMA - A MI Pártunk	IMA	Vince Száva	Ethnic party	Centre-right	
Libertarian Party; Libertárius Párt	Libertáriusok	Balázs Gábori L.	Libertarianism	Centre	
White Raven Order Party; Fehér Holló Rend Párt	Fehér Holló	André Nyerges	Third Way	Centre	
Alternative Party; Alternatíva Párt		Péter Dóczi	Social democracy	Centre-left to left-wing	
Second Reform Era Party; Második Reformkor Párt	2RK	Gábor Vona	Centrism	Centre	
Cut taxes by 75% Le az adók 75%-ával	LA75	Áron Ecsenyi	Libertarianism	Right-wing	

== Historical parties ==
=== Before the Hungarian Revolution of 1848 ===
List of political parties in Hungary before the Hungarian Revolution of 1848
English name	Hungarian name	Active	Ideology
Centralists	Centralisták	(1843–1849)	Centralism; Classical liberalism
Conservative Party	Konzervatív Párt	(1846–1849)	Conservatism; Liberal conservatism
Opposition Party	Ellenzéki Párt	(1847–1849)	Classical liberalism National liberalism
Peace Party	Békepárt	(1848–1849)	Peace with Austria; Conservative liberalism

=== Between the Hungarian Revolution of 1848 and the Ausgleich (1867) ===
After the Revolution of 1848 three different political directions were created - '47ers, '48ers and '49ers.

List of political parties in Hungary between the Hungarian Revolution of 1848 and the Ausgleich (1867)
English name	Hungarian name	Active	Ideology
Address Party	Felirati párt	(1861–1865)	Ideology of the '48ers National liberalism
Resolution Party	Határozati párt	(1861)	Ideology of the '49ers Radical liberalism
Left Centre	Balközép	(1865–1875)	Ideology of the '48ers (before the Ausgleich (1867)); Ideology of the '49ers (after the Ausgleich (1867))

=== During the time of the Austro-Hungarian Empire (1867–1918) ===
List of political parties in Hungary during the Austro-Hungarian Empire (1867–1918)
English name	Hungarian name	Active	Ideology
Principled Left Centre	Elvhű Balközép	(1873–1874)	'48 ideology
Far-Left	Szélsőbal	(1861–1874)	'49 ideology (before the Ausgleich (1867)) '67 ideology (after the Ausgleich (1867)))
Deák Party	Deák Párt	(1865–1875)	'48 ideology (before the Ausgleich (1867)) '67 ideology (after the Ausgleich (1867))
Liberal Party	Liberális Párt / Szabadelvű Párt	(1875–1906)	Classical liberalism '67 ideology
Independence Party	Függetlenségi Párt	(1874–1884)	'48 ideology
Independence Party of 1848	Negyvennyolcas Függetlenségi Párt	(1874–1884)	'48 ideology
National Antisemitic Party	Országos Antiszemita Párt	(1883–1892)	Antisemitism
Party of Independence and '48	Függetlenségi és 48-as Párt	(1884–1945)	Classical liberalism '48 ideology
MSZDP	Magyar Szociáldemokrata Párt	(1890–?)	Social democracy
Catholic People's Party	Katolikus Néppárt	(1894–1918)	Christian socialism
National Constitution Party	Országos Alkotmánypárt	(1905–1918)	Classical liberalism '67 ideology
National Party of Work	Nemzeti Munkapárt	(1910–1918)	Classical liberalism '67 ideology
Radical Civic Party	Polgári Radikális Párt	(1914–1919)	Civic radicalism
48-er Constitution Party	48-as Alkotmánypárt	(1918)	'48 ideology Classical liberalism
Independent Socialist Party	Független Szocialista Párt	(1897–1905)	Socialism; Agrarian socialism

=== During the First Hungarian Republic and Transitional period (1918–1920) ===
Name	Abbr.	Active	Ideology	Political position
Hungarian Communist Party; Magyar Kommunista Párt	MKP	(1918–1948)	Marxism; Communism	Far-left

=== During the Kingdom of Hungary (1920–1946) ===
English name	Hungarian name	Active	Ideology
Christian National Party	Keresztény Nemzeti Párt	(1919–1920)	Legitimism; Christian conservatism National conservatism
Christian Social and Economic Party	Keresztény Szociális és Gazdasági Párt	(1919–1920)	Social conservatism Christian democracy
Christian Socialist Party	Keresztényszocialista Párt	(1920–?)	Christian socialism
National Democratic Party	Nemzeti Demokrata Párt	(1920–?)	Liberalism
Civic Freedom Party	Polgári Szabadságpárt	(1921–1944)	Liberalism
'48 Smallholders Party	48-as Kisgazda Párt	(1922–?)	Agrarianism; National conservatism
Alliance of Christian Unity	Keresztény Egység Tábora	(1922–?)	Christian democracy
Christian National Agricultural Workers' and Civic Party	Keresztény Nemzeti Földmíves és Polgári Párt	(1922–?)	Agrarianism; Christian democracy
Christian Agricultural Workers and Craftsmen Party	Keresztény Földmíves és Iparos Párt	(1922–?)	Agrarianism; Christian democracy
Christian Women's League	Keresztény Női Tábor	(1918–1922)	Christian democracy Christian feminism
Christian National Economic Party	Keresztény Nemzeti Gazdasági Párt	(1925–1926)	Christian democracy Royalism
Socialist Workers Party of Hungary	Magyarországi Szocialista Munkáspárt	(1925–1928)	Social democracy Communism; Catch-all party
Christian Economic and Social Party	Keresztény Gazdasági és Szociális Párt	(1926–1937)	Christian democracy
Christian Opposition	Keresztény Ellenzék	(1922–1939)	Christian democracy
Hungarian National Socialist Party	Magyar Nemzeti Szocialista Párt	(1920s–1944)	Nazism; Antisemitism; Hungarian Turanism
Unity Party	Egységes Párt	(1922–1944)	Szeged Idea
Agrarian Party	Agrár Párt	(1926–?)	Agrarianism; National conservatism
Christian National Opposition Party	Keresztény Nemzeti Ellenzéki Párt	(1931–?)	Christian democracy National conservatism
United Opposition	Egyesült Ellenzék	(1931–?)	
Christian Economic Opposition Party	Keresztény Gazdasági Ellenzéki Párt	(1931–?)	Christian democracy
United Hungarian National Socialist Party	Egyesült Magyar Nemzeti Szocialista Párt	(1933–1940)	National socialism
National Legitimist Party	Nemzeti Legitimista Néppárt	(1935–1937)	Christian democracy
Arrow Cross Party	Nyilaskeresztes Párt	(1935–1945)	Hungarian Turanism; Fascism; Nazism
Christian National Front	Keresztény Nemzeti Front	(1935–?)	Christian democracy
Reform Generation	Reformnemzedék	(1935–?)	
Christian National Socialist Front	Keresztény Nemzeti Szocialista Front	(1937–1940)	National socialism

=== During the Second Hungarian Republic (1946–1949) ===
Name	Abbr.	Active	Ideology	Political position
Civic Democratic Party; Polgári Demokrata Párt	PDP	1944–1949	Liberalism; National liberalism	Centre-right
Hungarian Radical Party; Magyar Radikális Párt	MRP	1945–1949, 1989–1998	Social liberalism; Anti-communism	Left-wing
Hungarian Freedom Party; Magyar Szabadság Párt	MSZP	1946–1947, 1956, 1989–1999	National conservatism; Anti-Communism	Right-wing
Hungarian Independence Party; Magyar Függetlenségi Párt	MFP	1947, 1956, 1989–1990	National conservatism; Anti-Communism	Right-wing
Independent Hungarian Democratic Party; Független Magyar Demokrata Párt	FMDP	1947–1949, 1989–2011	Liberalism	Centre
Christian Women's League; Keresztény Női Tábor	KNT	1947–1949	Christian democracy; Christian feminism	Centre-right

=== During the Hungarian People's Republic (1949-1989) ===
Name	Abbr.	Active	Ideology	Political position
Hungarian Working People's Party; Magyar Dolgozók Pártja	MDP	(1948–1956)	Marxism; Stalinism; Communism	Far-left
Hungarian Socialist Workers' Party; Magyar Szocialista Munkáspárt	MSZMP	(1956–1989)	Kádárism; Marxism; Leninism	Far-left

=== During the Third Republic (since 1989) ===
Name	Abbr.	Active	Ideology	Political position
Green Party of Hungary; Magyarországi Zöld Párt	MZP	(1989–2011)	Green conservatism	Right-wing
Democratic Coalition Party; Demokrata Koalíció Párt	DKP	(1990-2001)	Christian socialism	Centre-left
Democratic Party; Demokrata Párt	DEMP	(1993–1994)	Democratic liberalism	Centre
Green Alternative; Zöld Alternatíva	ZA	(1993–2000)	Green politics	Centre-left
Hungarian Justice and Life Party; Magyar Igazság és Élet Pártja	MIÉP	(1993–2021)	Hungarian nationalism National conservatism Hard Euroscepticism	Right-wing to far-right
Hungarian Democratic Forum; Magyar Demokrata Fórum	MDF	(1987–2011)	Conservatism	Centre-right
Alliance of Free Democrats; Szabad Demokraták Szövetsége	SZDSZ	(1988–2013)	Social liberalism Economic liberalism	Centre
Holy Crown Society; Szent Korona Társaság	SZKT	(1989–1990) as Party	Monarchism	Right-wing
Republican Party (Hungary); Köztársaság Párt	SZKT	(1992–2003)	Conservative liberalism	Centre to centre-left
Social Democratic Party (Hungary); Szociáldemokrata Párt	SZDP	(1989–2013)	Social democracy	Centre-left
Centre Party (Hungary); Centrum Párt	Centrum	(2001–2013)	Centrism	Centre
Hungarian Democratic People's Party; Magyar Demokrata Néppárt	MDNP	(1996–2006)	Conservatism; Christian democracy	Centre-right
Humanist Party; Humanista Párt	HP	(1993–2003–2012)	Anti-globalization; Neohumanism	Centre-left
Alliance of Green Democrats; Zöld Demokraták Szövetsége	ZDSZ	(2000–2009)	Green politics	Centre-left
4K! – Fourth Republic! 4K! - Negyedik Köztársaság	4K!	(2012–2016)	Social Democracy; Left-wing nationalism	Left-wing
Unity Party; Összefogás Párt	ÖP	(2009–2018)	Centrism; Third Way	Centre-right
Green Left; Zöld Baloldal	ZB	(2009–2018) as Party	Eco-socialism	Left-wing
Together (Hungary); Együtt - A korszakváltók pártja	Együtt	(2013–2018)	Social democracy Social liberalism	Centre
Modern Hungary Movement; Modern Magyarország Mozgalom	MoMa	(2013–2019)	Liberal conservatism Pro-Europeanism	Centre-right
Hungarian Gypsy Party; Magyarországi Cigánypárt	MCP	(2013–2019)	Ethnic party	Centre
New Hungary Party; Új Magyarország Párt	ÚMP	(2013–2019)	Third Way	Centre
Independent Smallholders' Party; Független Kisgazdapárt	FKgP	(1930 (Note: The party was also a member of the National Assembly between 1931 and 1949.)–2021); The Party is under liquidation	Social conservatism Agrarianism; National conservatism	Right-wing
People's Front; Népi Front Párt	Népi Front	(2012–2021) as Party	Marxism-Leninism; Kádárism	Far-left
New World People's Party, Új Világ Néppárt	ÚVN	(2020–2022)	Liberal conservatism Economic liberalism Pro-Europeanism	Centre-right
Party of Greens; Zöldek Pártja	Zöldek Pártja	(2006–2022)	Green politics	Centre-left
Community for Social Justice People's Party; Közösség A Társadalmi Igazságosságért	KTI	(2013–2023); The Party is under liquidation	Third Way	Centre
Forum of Hungarian Gypsies; Magyarországi Cigányok Fóruma	MCF	(2002–2023)	Ethnic party	Centre
Civic Conservative Party; Polgári Konzervatív Párt	PKP	(2013–2023)	Liberal conservatism Economic liberalism Pro-Europeanism	Right-wing
Democratic Community of Welfare and Freedom; Jólét és Szabadság Demokrata Közösség	JESZ	(2011–2023)	Liberal conservatism Christian democracy	Centre-right
Táncsics – Radical Left Party; Táncsics - Radikális Balpárt	Táncsics	(2014–2023); The Party is under liquidation	Democratic socialism	Left-wing
Civic Response; Polgári Válasz	PV	(2021–2024); The Party is under liquidation	Conservatism	Centre-right to right-wing
Hungarian Republican Political Party; Magyar Republikánus Politikai Párt	MRPP	(2008–2024)	Conservatism, Nationalism	Centre-right to right-wing
New Start; Új Kezdet	ÚK	(2017–2025)	Third way, Conservative liberalism	Centre-right

== See also ==
- Politics of Hungary
- List of political parties by country
- List of political parties in Europe
- Liberalism and radicalism in Hungary
