= Interwar Hungary =

After the collapse of a short-lived Communist regime, according to historian István Deák:

Between 1919 and 1944 Hungary was a rightist country. Forged out of a counter-revolutionary heritage, its governments advocated a “nationalist Christian” policy; they extolled heroism, faith, and unity; they despised the French Revolution, and they spurned the liberal and socialist ideologies of the 19th century. The governments saw Hungary as a bulwark against bolshevism and bolshevism’s instruments: socialism, cosmopolitanism, and Freemasonry. They perpetrated the rule of a small clique of aristocrats, civil servants, and army officers, and surrounded with adulation the head of the state, the counterrevolutionary Admiral Horthy.

== First Hungarian Republic ==
On October 31, 1918, the Hungarian Democratic Republic was created by revolution that started in Budapest after the dissolution and break-up of Austria-Hungary at the end of World War I. The official proclamation of the republic was on November 16, 1918, and Mihály Károlyi was named as the republic's prime minister. This event also marked the independence of Hungary which had been ruled by the Habsburg monarchy for several centuries.

The First Hungarian Republic did not last long. Another revolution in 1919 marked the end of this state and the creation of a new communist state known as Hungarian Soviet Republic.

== Hungarian Soviet Republic ==
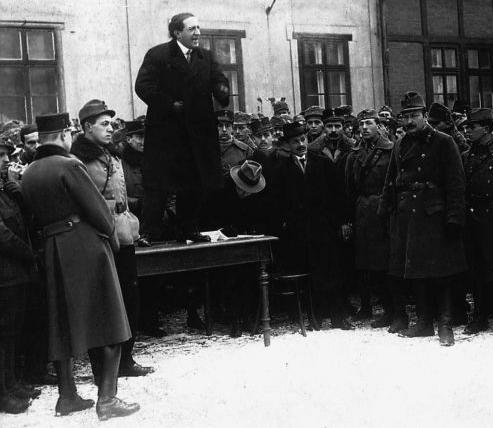
Communist József Pogány speaks to revolutionary soldiers during the 1919 revolution

The rise of the Hungarian Communist Party (HCP) to power was rapid. The party was organized in a Moscow hotel on November 4, 1918, when a group of Hungarian prisoners of war and communist sympathizers formed a Central Committee and dispatched members to Hungary to recruit new members, propagate the party's ideas, and radicalize Károlyi's government. By February 1919, the party numbered 30,000 to 40,000 members, including many unemployed ex-soldiers, young intellectuals, and Jews. In the same month, Béla Kun was imprisoned for incitement to riot, but his popularity skyrocketed when a journalist reported that he had been beaten by the police. Kun emerged from jail triumphant when the Social Democrats handed power to a government of "People's Commissars," who proclaimed the Hungarian Soviet Republic on March 21, 1919.

The communists wrote a temporary constitution guaranteeing freedom of speech and assembly; free education, language and cultural rights to minorities; and other rights. It also provided for suffrage for people over eighteen years of age except clergy, "former exploiters," and certain others. Single-list elections took place in April, but members of the parliament were selected indirectly by popularly elected committees. On June 25, Kun's government proclaimed a dictatorship of the proletariat, nationalized industrial and commercial enterprises, and socialized housing, transport, banking, medicine, cultural institutions, and all landholdings of more than 40.5 hectares or 100 acres. Kun undertook these measures even though the Hungarian communists were relatively few, and the support they enjoyed was based far more on their program to restore Hungary's borders than on their revolutionary agenda. Kun hoped that the Russian government would intervene on Hungary's behalf and that a worldwide workers' revolution was imminent. In an effort to secure its rule in the interim, the communist government resorted to arbitrary violence. Revolutionary tribunals ordered about 590 executions, including some for "crimes against the revolution." The government also used "red terror" to expropriate grain from peasants. This violence and the regime's moves against the clergy also shocked many Hungarians.

In late May, Kun attempted to fulfill his promise to restore Hungary's borders. The Hungarian Red Army marched northward and reoccupied part of Slovakia. Despite initial military success, however, Kun withdrew his troops about three weeks later when the French threatened to intervene. This concession shook his popular support. Kun then unsuccessfully turned the Hungarian Red Army on the Romanians, who broke through Hungarian lines on July 30, occupied Budapest, and ousted Kun's Soviet Republic on August 1, 1919. Kun fled first to Vienna and then to the Russian SFSR, where he was executed during Stalin's purge of foreign communists in the late 1930s.

=== Counterrevolution ===
A militantly anti-communist authoritarian government composed of military officers entered Budapest on the heels of the Romanians. A "white terror" ensued that led to the imprisonment, torture, and execution without trial of communists, socialists, Jews, leftist intellectuals, sympathizers with the Károlyi and Kun regimes, and others who threatened the traditional Hungarian political order that the officers sought to reestablish. Estimates placed the number of executions at approximately 5,000. In addition, about 75,000 people were jailed. In particular, the Hungarian right wing and the Romanian forces targeted Jews for retribution. Ultimately, the white terror forced nearly 100,000 people to leave the country, most of them socialists, intellectuals, and middle-class Jews.

== Monarchy restored ==
In 1920 and 1921, internal chaos racked Hungary. The White Terror continued to plague Jews and leftists, unemployment and inflation soared, and penniless Hungarian refugees poured across the border from neighboring countries and burdened the floundering economy. The government offered the population little succor. In January 1920, Hungarian men and women cast the first secret ballots in the country's political history and elected a large counterrevolutionary and agrarian majority to a unicameral parliament. Two main political parties emerged: the socially conservative Christian National Union and the Independent Smallholders' Party, which advocated land reform. In March, the parliament annulled both the Pragmatic Sanction of 1713 and the Compromise of 1867, and it restored the Hungarian monarchy but postponed electing a king until civil disorder had subsided. Instead, Admiral Miklós Horthy — a former commander in chief of the Austro-Hungarian navy — was elected regent and was empowered, among other things, to appoint Hungary's prime minister, veto legislation, convene or dissolve the parliament, and command the armed forces.

Sándor Simonyi-Semadam was named prime minister of the restored Kingdom of Hungary. Charles IV (Note: Also known as Karl IV, or IV. Károly in Hungary, and known as Charles I in Austria) was the last emperor of Austria and the last king of Hungary. Charles was not asked to fill the vacant Hungarian throne because Horthy knew the Allies would consider restoring him an act of war. The government of Horthy immediately declared null and void all laws and edicts passed by the Karolyi and Kun regimes, in effect renouncing the 1918 armistice. Horthy's authoritarianism and the violent anti-communist backlash resulted in interwar Hungary having one of the quietest political landscapes in Central Europe. Later on, when he wished to take out loans from the West, they pressured him into democratic reforms. Horthy only did as much as he absolutely had to, since the Western powers were geographically distant from Hungary and soon turned their attention to matters elsewhere.

Horthy appointed Pál Teleki as prime minister in July 1920. His right-wing government set quotas effectively limiting admission of Jews to universities, legalized capital punishment, and to quiet rural discontent, took initial steps towards fulfilling a promise of major land reform by dividing about 385,000 hectares or 950,000 acres from the largest estates into smallholdings. Teleki's government resigned, however, after the former Austrian emperor, Charles IV, unsuccessfully attempted to retake Hungary's throne in March 1921. King Charles' return split parties between conservatives who favored a Habsburg restoration and nationalist right-wing radicals who supported election of a Hungarian king. István Bethlen, a nonaffiliated, right-wing member of the parliament, took advantage of this rift by convincing members of the Christian National Union who opposed Karl's re-enthronement to merge with the Smallholders' Party and form a new Party of Unity with Bethlen as its leader. Horthy then appointed Bethlen prime minister.

As prime minister, Bethlen dominated Hungarian politics between 1921 and 1931. He fashioned a political machine by amending the electoral law, eliminating peasants from the Party of Unity, providing jobs in the bureaucracy to his supporters, and manipulating elections in rural areas. Bethlen restored order to the country by giving the radical counter-revolutionaries payoffs and government jobs in exchange for ceasing their campaign of terror against Jews and leftists. In 1921, Bethlen made a deal with the Social Democrats and trade unions, agreeing, among other things, to legalize their activities and free political prisoners in return for their pledge to refrain from spreading anti-Hungarian propaganda, calling political strikes, and organizing the peasantry. In May 1922, the Party of Unity captured a large parliamentary majority. Charles IV's death, soon after he failed a second time to reclaim the throne in October 1921, allowed the revision of the Treaty of Trianon to rise to the top of Hungary's political agenda. Bethlen's strategy to win the treaty's revision was first to strengthen his country's economy and then to build relations with stronger nations that could further Hungary's goals. Revision of the treaty had such a broad backing in Hungary that Bethlen used it, at least in part, to deflect criticism of his economic, social, and political policies. However, Bethlen's only foreign policy success was a treaty of friendship with Italy in 1927, which had little immediate impact.

== Postwar political and economic conditions ==
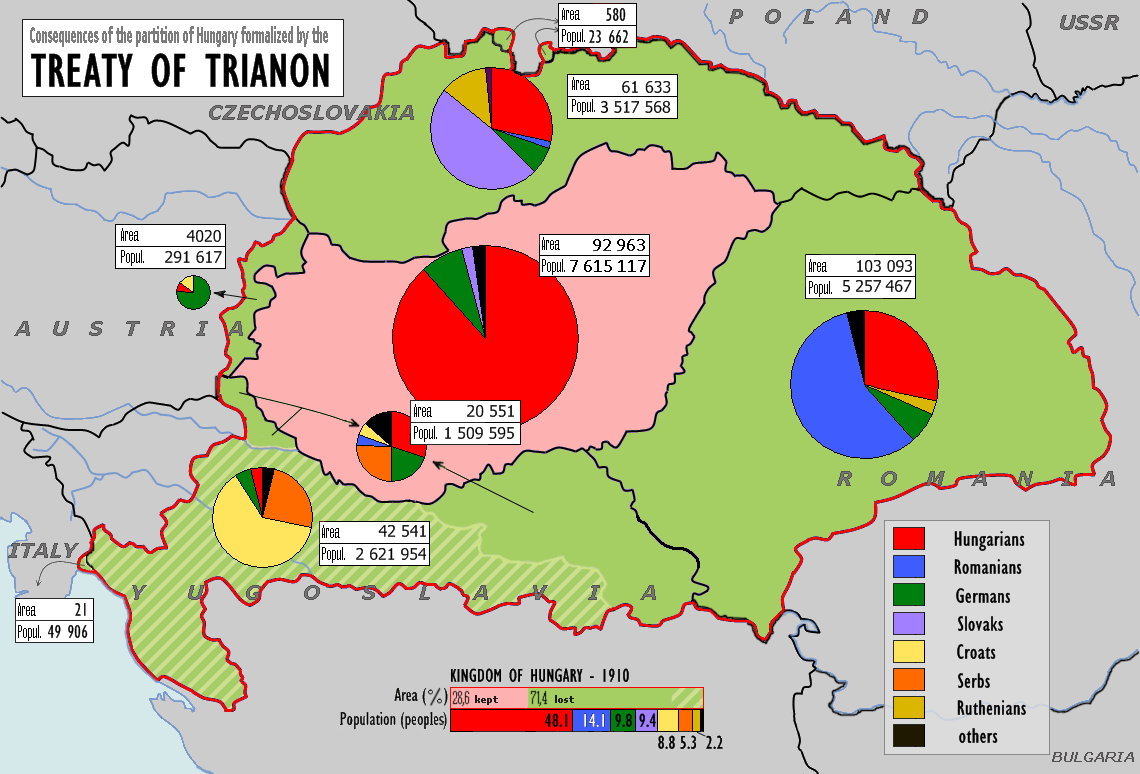
Difference between the borders of the Kingdom of Hungary before and after the Treaty of Trianon.

Hungary's signing of the Treaty of Trianon on June 4, 1920, ratified the country's dismemberment, limited the size of its armed forces, and required reparations payments. The territorial provisions of the treaty, which ensured continued discord between Hungary and its neighbors, required the Hungarians to surrender more than two-thirds of their prewar lands. Romania acquired Transylvania; Yugoslavia gained Croatia, Slavonia, and Vojvodina; Slovakia became a part of Czechoslovakia; and Austria also acquired a small piece of pre-war Hungarian territory. Hungary also lost about 60 percent of its pre-war population, and about one-third of the 10 million ethnic Hungarians found themselves outside the diminished homeland. The country's ethnic composition was left almost homogeneous. Hungarians constituted about 90 percent of the population, Germans made up about 6 to 8 percent, and Slovaks, Croats, Romanians, Jews, and other minorities accounted for the remainder.

New international borders separated Hungary's industrial base from its sources of raw materials and its former markets for agricultural and industrial products. Its new circumstances forced Hungary to become a trading nation. Hungary lost 84 percent of its timber resources, 43 percent of its arable land, and 83 percent of its iron ore. Because most of the country's prewar industry was concentrated near Budapest, Hungary retained about 51 percent of its industrial population, 56 percent of its industry, 82 percent of its heavy industry, and 70 percent of its banks.

=== Economic development ===
When Bethlen took office, the government was all-but-bankrupt. Tax revenues were so paltry that he turned to domestic gold and foreign-currency reserves to meet about half of the 1921–22 budget and almost 80 percent of the 1922–23 budget. To improve his country's economic circumstances, Bethlen undertook development of industry. He imposed tariffs on finished goods and earmarked the revenues to subsidize new industries. Bethlen squeezed the agricultural sector to increase cereal exports, which generated foreign currency to pay for imports critical to the industrial sector. Further compounding Hungary's problems was that of its four neighbors, three (Czechoslovakia, Romania, and Yugoslavia) were enemies and kept troops stationed on their borders at all times, even though Hungary had an army of only 20,000 men. The fourth, Austria, was a struggling nation and little more than an economic competitor. In 1924, after the white terror had waned and Hungary had gained admission to the League of Nations (Note: Hungary joined the League in 1922), the Bethlen government was able to borrow a US$50 million loan from the League, which in order to protect its investment placed the country in effective receivership, even placing an American banker, Jeremiah Smith, in charge of the country's finances. Hungary's outcast status had prevented it from obtaining any foreign aid in the immediate postwar period, but by the middle of the 1920s, the British decided to extend the hand of friendship to the losers of World War I. Hungary also obtained sympathy from the United States and Mussolini's Italy. Meanwhile, France and Hungary's neighbors vigorously objected.

By the late 1920s, Bethlen's policies had brought order to the economy. The number of factories increased by about 66 percent, hyperinflation subsided with the new pengő currency, and the national income climbed 20 percent. However, the apparent stability was supported by a rickety framework of constantly revolving foreign credits and high world grain prices; therefore, Hungary remained undeveloped in comparison with the wealthier Western European countries, as most of the foreign loans went for non-productive purposes such as graft, expanding bureaucracy, and monumental public works projects. Agricultural products were subject to unstable prices and the vagaries of the weather. Furthermore, tariffs were commonplace in America and Europe during the 1920s, which frequently made it difficult to export. Hungary was no exception and liberally employed trade barriers to protect its manufacturing base. Exports also had to pass through Hungary's neighbors to reach the West, and as noted above, all but one was hostile.

Despite economic progress, the workers' standard of living remained poor, and consequently the working class never gave Bethlen its political support. The labor movement had never developed in pre-World War I Hungary the way it did in Austria, and the Horthy government remained resolutely opposed to organized labor or social reforms. There was no minimum wage or any sort of labor laws in Hungary almost until the start of World War II, and wages were further undercut by peasants flocking into Budapest who were willing to work for almost nothing. On the whole, workers fared more poorly in interwar Hungary then they had before World War I. The peasants were even worse off than the working class. In the 1920s, about 60 percent of the peasants were either landless or were cultivating plots too small to provide a decent living. Real wages for agricultural workers remained below prewar levels, and the peasants had practically no political voice. Moreover, once Bethlen had consolidated his power, he ignored calls for land reform. The industrial sector failed to expand fast enough to provide jobs for all the peasants and university graduates seeking work. Most peasants lingered in the villages, and in the 1930s Hungarians in rural areas were extremely dissatisfied. Hungary's foreign debt ballooned as Bethlen expanded the bureaucracy to absorb the university graduates who, if left idle, might have threatened civil order. This was because Hungary, like the rest of Eastern Europe, had an educational system primarily focused on the liberal arts and law rather than science, engineering, or other practical subjects that might have helped the country's development. University graduates mostly sought employment in the bureaucracy, where they were guaranteed an easy, secure job. When they could not obtain work, either because they lacked useful skills or because the swollen bureaucracy had no openings available, they would invariably blame their bad luck on Jews. This would contribute to an anti-Semitism in Hungary that would ultimately have tragic consequences.

Following the Wall Street Crash of 1929 in the United States and the beginning of the Great Depression, world grain prices plummeted, and the framework supporting Hungary's economy buckled. Hungary's earnings from grain exports declined as prices and volume dropped, tax revenues fell, foreign credit sources dried up, and short-term loans were called in. The Hungarian national bank depleted its supply of precious metals and foreign currency during a period of a few weeks in 1931. Hungary sought financial relief from the League of Nations, which insisted on a program of rigid fiscal belt-tightening, resulting in increased unemployment. The peasants reverted to subsistence farming. Industrial production rapidly dropped, and businesses went bankrupt as domestic and foreign demand evaporated. Government workers lost their jobs or suffered severe pay cuts. By 1933 about 18 percent of Budapest's citizens lived in poverty. Unemployment leapt from 5 percent in 1928 to almost 36 percent by 1933.

== Shift to the right ==
As the standard of living dropped, the political mood of the country shifted further towards the right. Bethlen resigned without warning amid national turmoil in August 1931. His successor, Gyula Károlyi, failed to quell the crisis. Horthy then appointed a reactionary demagogue, Gyula Gömbös, but only after Gömbös agreed to maintain the existing political system, to refrain from calling elections before the parliament's term had expired, and to appoint several Bethlen supporters to head key ministries. Gömbös publicly renounced the vehement antisemitism he had espoused earlier, and his party and government included some Jews.

Gömbös’ appointment marked the beginning of the radical right's ascendancy in Hungarian politics, which lasted with few interruptions until 1945. The radical right garnered its support from medium and small farmers, former refugees from Hungary's lost territories, and unemployed civil servants, army officers, and university graduates. Gömbös advocated a one-party government, revision of the Treaty of Trianon, withdrawal from the League of Nations, anti-intellectualism, and social reform. He assembled a political machine, but his efforts to fashion a one-party state and fulfill his reform platform were frustrated by a parliament composed mostly of Bethlen's supporters and by Hungary's creditors, who forced Gömbös to follow conventional policies in dealing with the economic and financial crisis. The 1935 election gave Gömbös more solid support in the parliament, and he succeeded in gaining control of the ministries of finance, industry, and defense and in replacing several key military officers with his supporters. In September 1936, Gömbös informed German officials that he would establish a Nazi-like, one-party government in Hungary within two years, but he died in October without realizing this goal.

In foreign affairs, Gömbös led Hungary towards close relations with Fascist Italy and especially Germany; in fact, Gömbös coined the term Axis, which was later adopted by the German-Italian military alliance. Soon after his appointment, Gömbös visited Italian dictator Benito Mussolini and gained his support for revision of the Treaty of Trianon. Later, Gömbös became the first foreign head of government to visit German chancellor Adolf Hitler. For a time, Hungary profited handsomely, as Gömbös signed a trade agreement with Germany that drew Hungary's economy out of depression but made Hungary dependent on the German economy for both raw materials and markets. In 1928, Germany had accounted for 19.5 percent of Hungary's imports and 11.7 percent of its exports; by 1939 the figures were 52.5 percent and 52.2 percent, respectively. Hungary's annual rate of economic growth from 1934 to 1940 averaged 10.8 percent. The number of workers in industry doubled in the ten years after 1933, and the number of agricultural workers dropped below 50 percent for the first time in the country's history.

=== On the eve of World War II ===
Map of territories reassigned to Hungary in 1938–1941

The Kingdom of Hungary also used its relationship with Germany to chip away at the Treaty of Trianon. In 1938, Hungary openly repudiated the treaty's restrictions on its armed forces. With German help, Hungary extended its territory four times and doubled in size from 1938 to 1941, even fighting a short war with the newly created Slovakia. Hungary regained parts of southern Slovakia in 1938, Carpatho-Ukraine in 1939, northern Transylvania in 1940, and parts of Vojvodina in 1941.

Hitler's assistance did not come without a price. After 1938, the Führer used promises of additional territories, economic pressure, and threats of military intervention to pressure the Hungarians into supporting his policies, including those related to Europe's Jews, which encouraged Hungary's antisemites. The percentage of Jews in business, finance, and the professions far exceeded the percentage of Jews in the overall population. After the depression struck, antisemites made the Jews scapegoats for Hungary's economic plight.

Hungary's Jews suffered the first blows of this renewed anti-Semitism during the government of Gömbös’ successor, Kálmán Darányi, who fashioned a coalition of conservatives and reactionaries and dismantled Gömbös’ political machine. After Horthy publicly dashed hopes of land reform, discontented right-wingers took to the streets denouncing the government and baiting the Jews. Darányi's government attempted to appease the anti-Semites and the Nazis by proposing and passing the first so-called Jewish Law, which set quotas limiting Jews to 20 percent of the positions in certain businesses and professions. The law failed to satisfy Hungary's anti-Semitic radicals, however, and when Darányi tried to appease them again, Horthy unseated him in 1938. The regent then appointed the ill-starred Béla Imrédy, who drafted a second, harsher Jewish Law before political opponents forced his resignation in February 1939 by presenting documents showing that Imrédy's own grandfather was a Jew.

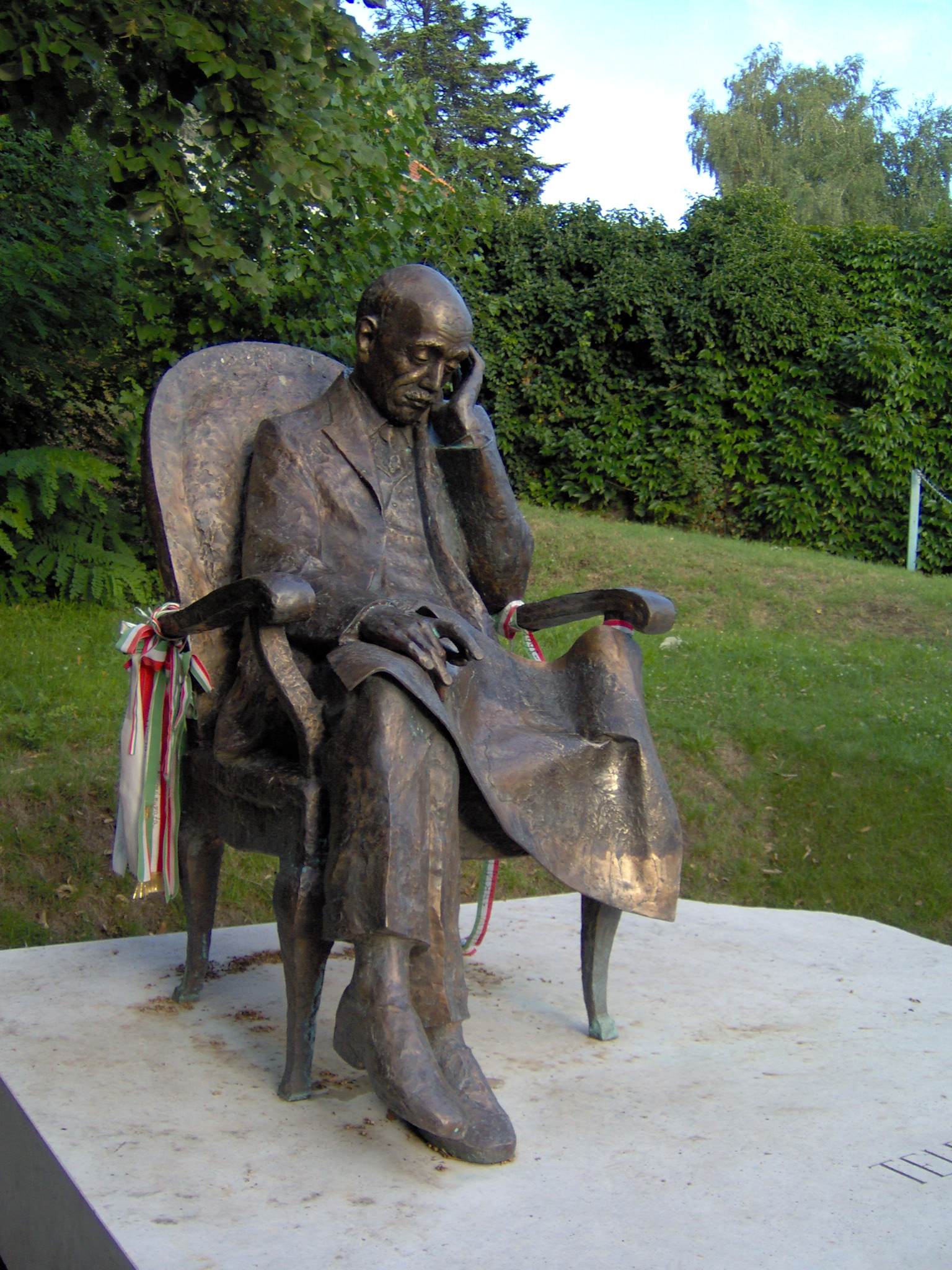
Statue of Pál Teleki

Imrédy's downfall led to Pál Teleki's return to the prime minister's office. Teleki dissolved some of the fascist parties but did not alter the fundamental policies of his predecessors. He undertook a bureaucratic reform and launched cultural and educational programs to help the rural poor. But Teleki also oversaw passage of the second Jewish Law, which broadened the definition of "Jewishness," cut the quotas on Jews permitted in the professions and in business, and required that the quotas be attained by the hiring of Gentiles or the firing of Jews.

By the June 1939 elections, Hungarian public opinion had shifted so far to the right that voters gave the Arrow Cross Party — Hungary's equivalent of Germany's Nazi Party–the second highest number of votes. In September 1940, the Hungarian government allowed German troops to transit the country on their way to Romania, and on November 20, 1940, Teleki signed the Tripartite Pact, which allied the country with Germany, Italy, and Japan, and ensured Hungary's involvement in the Second World War.

== Social structure ==
Until World War I, striking inequalities distinguished the distribution of wealth, power, privilege, and opportunity among social groups. The various social strata had different codes of behavior and distinctive dress, speech, and manners. Respect showed to persons varied according to the source of their wealth. Wealth derived from possession of land was valued more highly than that coming from trade or banking. The country was predominantly rural, and landownership was the central factor in determining the status and prestige of most families. In some of the middle and upper strata of society, noble birth was also an important criterion as was, in some cases, the holding of certain occupations. An intricate system of ranks and titles distinguished the various social stations. Hereditary titles designated the aristocracy and gentry. Persons who had achieved positions of eminence, whether or not they were of noble birth, often received nonhereditary titles from the state. The gradations of rank derived from titles had great significance in social intercourse and in the relations between the individual and the state. Among the rural population, which consisted largely of peasants and which made up the overwhelming majority of the country's people, distinctions derived from such factors as the size of a family's landholding; whether the family owned the land and hired help to work it, owned and worked the land itself, or worked for others; and family reputation. The prestige and respect accompanying landownership were evident in many facets of life in the countryside, from finely shaded modes of polite address, to special church seating, to selection of landed peasants to fill public offices.

Landowners, wealthy bankers, aristocrats and gentry, and various commercial leaders made up the elite. Together, these groups accounted for only 13 percent of the population. Between 10 and 18 percent of the population consisted of the petite bourgeoisie and the petty gentry, various government officials, intellectuals, retail store owners, and well-to-do professionals. More than two-thirds of the remaining population lived in varying degrees of poverty. Their only real chance for upward mobility lay in becoming civil servants, but such advancement was difficult because of the exclusive nature of the education system. The industrial working class was growing, but the largest group remained the peasantry, most of whom had too little land or none at all.

Although the inter-war years witnessed considerable cultural and economic progress in the country, the social structure changed little. A great chasm remained between the gentry, both social and intellectual, and the rural "people." Jews held a place of prominence in the country's economic, social, and political life. They constituted the bulk of the middle class. They were well assimilated, worked in a variety of professions, and were of various political persuasions.

== See also ==
- International relations (1919–1939)#Hungary
- Revolutions and interventions in Hungary (1918–1920)
