= 1920 Hungarian parliamentary election =

- January 1920–October 1921

All 219 elected seats in the Diet 110 seats needed for a majority
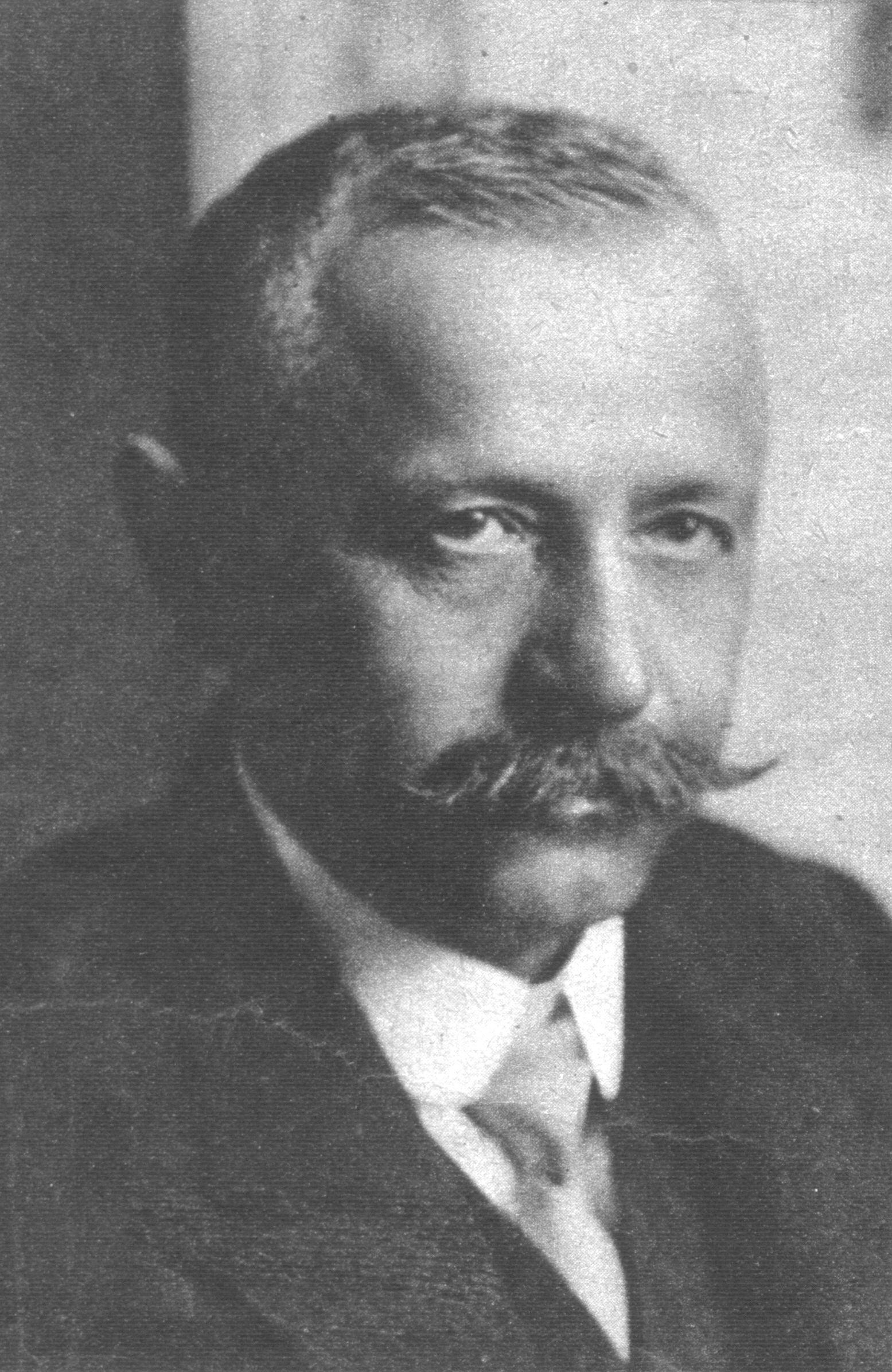

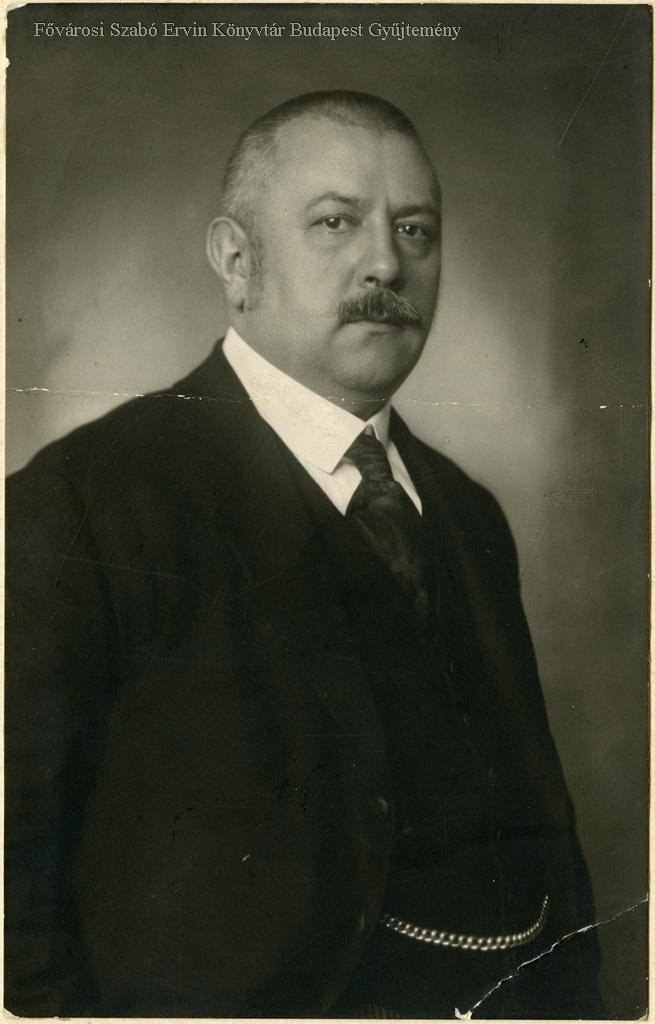

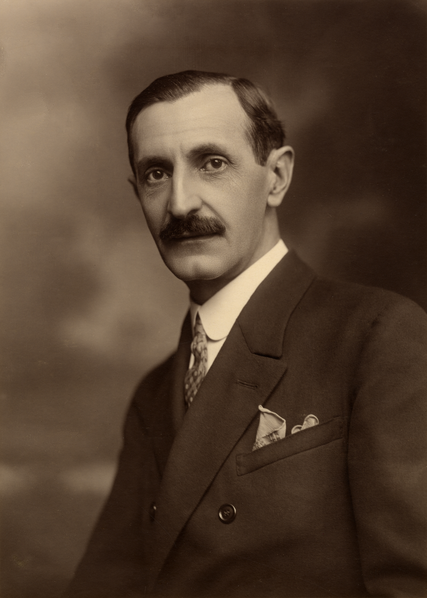
	First party	Second party	Third party
Leader	István Szabó	Károly Wolff	Gábor Ugron
Party	OKgFP	KNEP	NDP
Seats won	112 / 219	82 / 219	6 / 219
Popular vote	637,168	514,006	68,009
Percentage	45.84%	36.98%	4.89%
Prime Minister before election
Károly Huszár
KNEP
Prime Minister after election
Sándor Simonyi-Semadam
KNEP

Parliamentary elections were held in Hungary on 25 and 26 January 1920. However, they were only held in 164 districts. After the Treaty of Trianon was signed, the 44 districts previously occupied by Romania voted between 13 June and 5 July, whilst the 11 districts occupied by Serbia did not vote until 30 and 31 October 1921. The election was held with compulsory voting. In protest at this and other changes to the franchise that left 60% of the voting age population unable to vote, the Hungarian Social Democratic Party boycotted the elections, and called for its supporters to cast invalid votes, resulting in an unusually high number of blank or invalid votes – 12% in the January elections and over 20% in Budapest and other major cities.

The National Smallholders and Agricultural Labourers Party and the Christian National Union Party won 194 of the 219 seats and formed a coalition government on 15 March. However, it lasted only until 4 June when the Treaty of Trianon was signed.

== Parties and leaders ==
Party	Leader
National Smallholders and Agricultural Labourers Party (OKgFP)	István Szabó
Christian National Union Party (KNEP)	Károly Wolff
National Democratic Party (NDP)	Gábor Ugron
Christian Socialist Party (KSZP)	István Haller
Christian National Party (KNP)	István Friedrich
Christian Social and Economic Party (KSZGP)	Sándor Giesswein

== Results ==
Party	January 1920 (Note: The number of votes for January 1920 elections is taken only from 83 of the 164 seats. In 37 of the remaining 81 seats there was only one candidate who was elected unopposed.)			June–July 1920 (Note: The number of votes is taken from only 13 of the 44 seats. In three of the remaining 31 seats there was only one candidate who was elected unopposed.)			October 1921 (Note: The number of votes is taken from only seven of the eleven seats. In one of the remaining four seats a candidate was elected unopposed.)			Total seats
Party	Votes	%	Seats	Votes	%	Seats	Votes	%	Seats	Total seats
National Smallholders and Agricultural Labourers Party (Note: The majority of candidates representing what would become the National Smallholders and Agricultural Labourers Party contested the election as Christian Smallholders or Christian National Smallholders, as the united party was not formed until January 1922.)	491,114	42.33	78	113,696	73.26	29	32,358	43.34	5	112
Christian National Union Party	481,008	41.46	73	15,824	10.20	8	17,174	23.00	1	82
National Democratic Party	68,009	5.86	6							6
Christian Socialist Party	25,575	2.20	3							3
National Centre Party	16,200	1.40	0							0
Party of Independence and '48	14,928	1.29	0							0
Hungarian Public Interest Party	7,142	0.62	0							0
Christian Social and Economic Party	6,040	0.52	1							1
Christian National Party	4,756	0.41	0	1,098	0.71	2	507	0.68	0	2
Hungarian Workers' Party	2,119	0.18	0	1,652	1.06	1				1
Christian National '48 Party	1,087	0.09	0							0
National Defence Party							3,270	4.38	0	0
Christian Democratic Civic Party							2,522	3.38	0	0
Independents	42,119	3.63	3	22,931	14.78	4	18,829	25.22	5	12
Total	1,160,097	100.00	164	155,201	100.00	44	74,660	100.00	11	219
Valid votes	1,160,097	88.17		155,201	96.95		74,660	97.75		
Invalid/blank votes	155,580	11.83		4,881	3.05		1,716	2.25		
Total votes	1,315,677	100.00		160,082	100.00		76,376	100.00		
Registered voters/turnout	1,487,542	88.45		182,223	87.85		82,117	93.01		
Source: Nohlen & Stöver
