= Hungarian Republic (1919–1920) =

Counter-revolutionary rump state in Central Europe

Coordinates: 47°29′N 19°02′E

Hungarian Republic Magyar Köztársaság (Hungarian)
- 1919–1920
- Flag Coat of arms
- Anthem: Himnusz (English: "Hymn")
- Status: Unrecognised rump state until 10 September 1919
- Capital: Budapest
- Common languages: Hungarian
- Religion: Roman Catholicism; Calvinism; Lutheranism; Eastern Orthodoxy; Eastern Catholicism; Unitarianism; Judaism
- Demonym: Hungarian
- Government: Republic
- Regent
  - Aug. 1919: AD. Joseph August
- President
  - Aug. 1919 – Nov. 1919: István Friedrich^{a}
  - Nov. 1919 – Mar. 1920: Károly Huszár^{a}
- Prime Minister
  - Aug. 1919 – Nov. 1919: István Friedrich
  - Nov. 1919 – Mar. 1920: Károly Huszár
- Legislature: National Assembly
- Historical era: Interwar period
  - István Friedrich seizes power: 6 August 1919
  - Established: 8 August 1919
  - Recognized (Treaty of Saint-Germain): 10 September 1919
  - Parliamentary elections: 25 January 1920
  - Monarchy restored: 29 February 1920

Area
- 1920: 92,833 km^{2} (35,843 sq mi)

Population
  - 1920: 7,980,143
- Currency: Hungarian korona
Preceded by	Succeeded by
First Hungarian Republic	Kingdom of Hungary
- 1. as acting Head of State

The Hungarian Republic (Hungarian: Magyar Köztársaság) was a short-lived republic that existed between August 1919 and February 1920 in the central and western portions of the former First Hungarian Republic (controlling most of today's Hungary and parts of present-day Austria, Slovakia and Slovenia). The state was established in the aftermath of the Hungarian–Romanian War by counter-revolutionary forces who sought to return to the status quo prior to 31 October 1918.

Following this period, the Allies of World War I severely pressured the Hungarians into retreating behind post-war demarcation lines as a provision to the Paris Peace Conference of 1919, which was the Allies' attempt to establish new nation states among the former kingdom's non-Hungarian citizens, the principal beneficiaries of which were the Kingdom of Romania, the Kingdom of Serbs, Croats, and Slovenes, the Austrian Republic, and the Czechoslovak Republic. Subsequently, the Republic was transformed back into the Kingdom of Hungary, which signed the Treaty of Trianon under protest.

== History ==
On 6 August 1919 István Friedrich, leader of the White House Comrades Association (a right-wing, counter-revolutionary group), ousted the government of Gyula Peidl and seized power in a coup with the backing of the Royal Romanian Army. The coup d'état was met with widespread approval within Hungary. The next day, Joseph August declared himself regent of Hungary (he held the position until 23 August, when he was forced to resign) and appointed Friedrich as Prime Minister. He was succeeded by Károly Huszár on 24 November, who served as prime minister and interim president until the restoration of the monarchy a few months later.

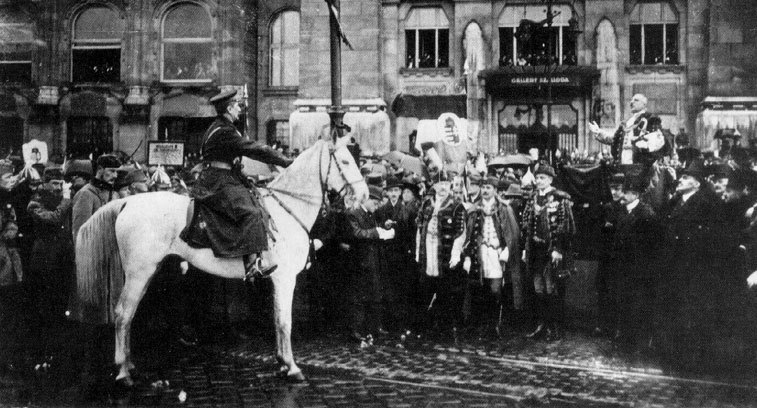
Admiral Miklós Horthy entering Budapest as the head of the National Army on 16 November 1919. He is being greeted by city officials in front of the Hotel Gellért.

A militantly anti-communist authoritarian government composed of military officers entered Budapest in November on the heels of the Romanians. A "White Terror" ensued that led to the imprisonment, torture, and execution without trial of communists, socialists, Jews, leftist intellectuals, sympathizers with the Károlyi and Kun regimes, and others who threatened the traditional Hungarian political order that the officers sought to re-establish. Estimates placed the number of executions at approximately 5,000. In addition, about 75,000 people were jailed. In particular, the Hungarian right-wing and the Romanian forces targeted Jews for retribution. Ultimately, the White Terror forced nearly 100,000 people to leave the country, most of them socialists, intellectuals, and middle-class Jews.

In 1920 and 1921, internal chaos racked Hungary. The White Terror continued to plague Jews and leftists, unemployment and inflation soared, and penniless Hungarian refugees poured across the border from neighboring countries and burdened the floundering economy. The government offered the population little succour. In January 1920, Hungarian men and women cast the first secret ballots in the country's political history and elected a large counter-revolutionary and agrarian majority to the unicameral parliament. Two main political parties emerged: the socially conservative Christian National Union Party and the National Smallholders and Agricultural Labourers Party, which advocated land reform. On 29 February 1920, the parliament restored the Hungarian monarchy, ending the republic, and in March, annulled both the Pragmatic Sanction of 1713 and the Compromise of 1867. The parliament postponed electing a king until civil disorder had subsided. Former Austro-Hungarian admiral Miklós Horthy became regent, a position he would hold until 1944.

== See also ==
- Revolutions and interventions in Hungary (1918–1920)
  - First Hungarian Republic
  - Hungarian Soviet Republic
