= 1922 Hungarian parliamentary election =

- 28 May–2 June 1922

All 245 elected seats in the Diet 123 seats needed for a majority
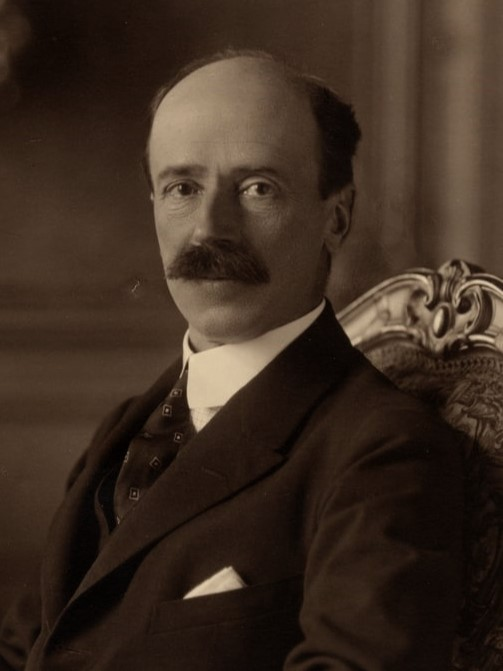

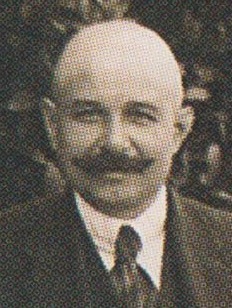

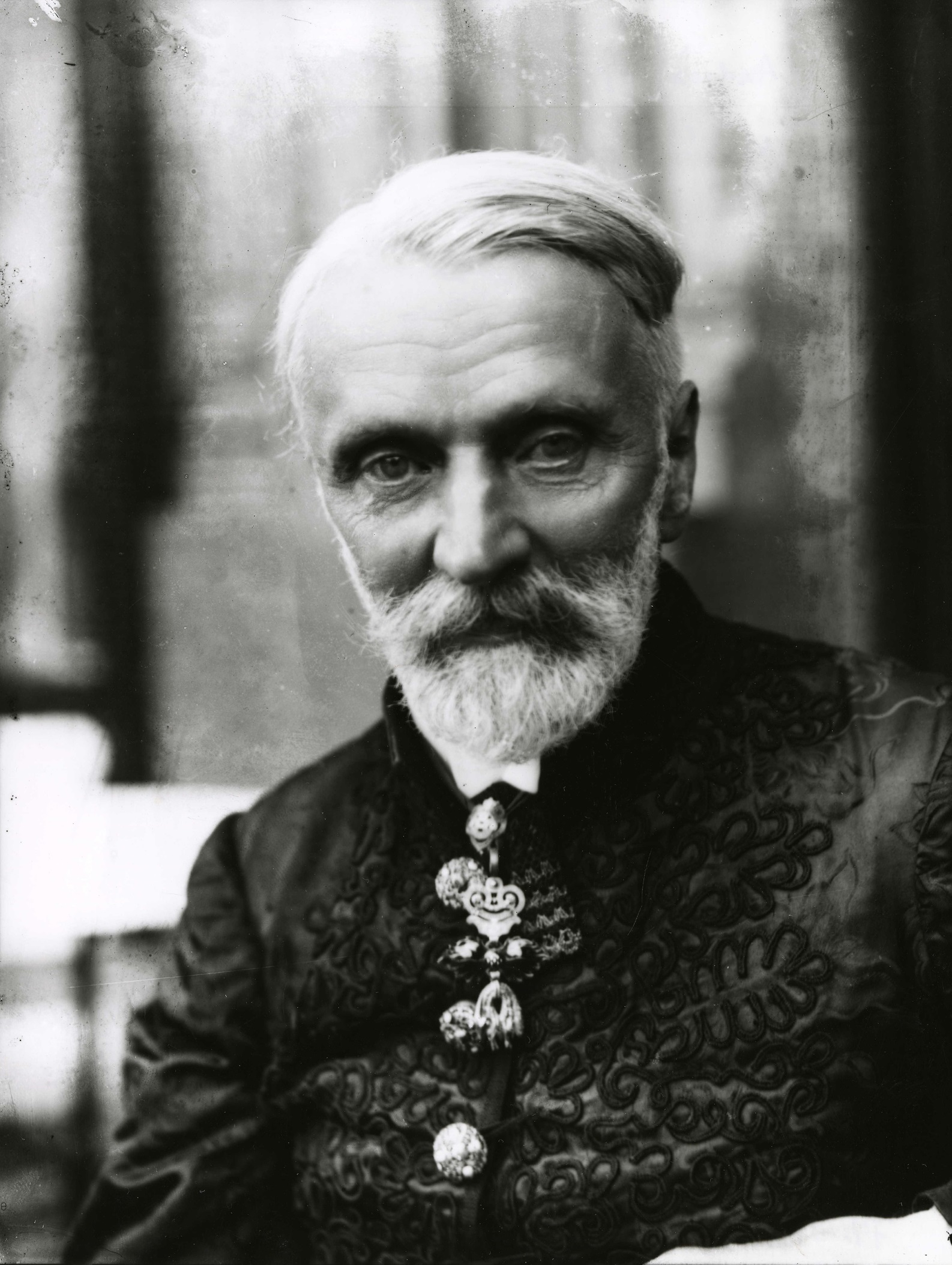
	First party	Second party	Third party
Leader	István Bethlen	Károly Peyer	Gyula Andrássy
Party	KKFKgP	MSZDP	KNFPP
Seats won	140 / 245	25 / 245	11 / 245
Popular vote	623,201	277,481	103,705
Percentage	38.18%	17.00%	6.35%
Prime Minister before election
István Bethlen
KKFKgP
Prime Minister after election
István Bethlen
KKFKgP

Parliamentary elections were held in Hungary between 28 May and 2 June 1922. The result was a victory for the Unity Party (a renamed National Smallholders and Agricultural Labourers Party), which won 140 of the 245 seats in Parliament, the vast majority in "open" constituencies where there was no secret ballot.

== Electoral system ==
Prior to the elections the United Party-led government changed the electoral system in order to ensure it retained its leading position. This involved reintroducing open elections and restricting the electoral census. The reforms were passed by a decree by Prime Minister István Bethlen as Parliament had already been dissolved.

The country was divided into 219 constituencies, of which 215 were single member constituencies and four were multi-member constituencies. Of the 215 single member constituencies, only 20 used the secret ballot, with the remainder (which were rural constituencies) using open elections. All four multi-member constituencies used secret ballots.

== Parties and leaders ==
Party	Leader
Christian Farmers, Smallholders and Civic Party (KKFKgP)	István Bethlen
Social Democratic Party of Hungary (MSZDP)	Károly Peyer
Christian National Agricultural Workers' and Civic Party (KNFPP)	Gyula Andrássy
Christian National Union Party (KNEP)	Károly Wolff
National Democratic Party (NDP)	Vilmos Vázsonyi
Christian Socialist Party (KSZP)	István Haller
Party of Independence and '48 (F48P)	Tivadar Batthyány
Alliance of Christian Unity (KET)	Károly Huszár

== Results ==
Party	Votes	%	Seats	+/–
Unity Party	623,201	38.18	140	+28
Social Democratic Party of Hungary	277,481	17.00	25	New
Andrássy-Friedrich Party	103,705	6.35	11	New
United National Democratic and Liberal Opposition	79,434	4.87	7	+1
Christian National Union Party	70,748	4.33	10	–72
Independent Smallholders, Agrarian Workers and Civic Party	66,693	4.09	5	New
Christian Socialist Party	65,325	4.00	6	+3
Alliance of Christian Unity	59,508	3.65	5	New
Party of Independence and '48	33,220	2.04	1	+1
'48 Smallholders Party	26,972	1.65	2	New
National Civic Party	22,764	1.39	2	New
Christian Opposition	20,610	1.26	2	New
National Defence Party	8,067	0.49	0	0
Hungarian Workers' Party	7,768	0.48	1	0
Christian Agricultural Workers and Craftsmen Party	3,584	0.22	1	New
Liberal Opposition	2,929	0.18	1	New
National Democratic Party	1,944	0.12	0	–
Economic Policy Party	7,545	0.46	0	New
Christian National Party	3,547	0.22	0	–2
Hungarian National Socialist Bloc	1,423	0.09	0	0
Independents	145,836	8.93	26	+14
Total	1,632,304	100.00	245	+26
Registered voters/turnout	2,382,158	–		
Source: Nohlen & Stöver

=== By constituency type ===
Party	Open SMCs (Note: The number of votes refers to only 170 of the 195 open single member constituencies, as the remaining 25 were uncontested.)			Secret SMCs (Note: The number of votes refers to only 12 of the 20 secret single member constituencies.)			MMCs			Total seats	+/–
Party	Votes	%	Seats	Votes	%	Seats	Votes	%	Seats	Total seats	+/–
Unity Party	585,551	53.10	133	26,765	19.58	6	10,885	2.77	1	140	+28
Social Democratic Party of Hungary	69,501	6.30	5	40,268	29.46	7	167,712	42.68	13	25	New
Andrássy-Friedrich Party	77,612	7.04	9	6,151	4.50	0	19,942	5.08	2	11	New
United National Democratic and Liberal Opposition							79,434	20.22	7	7	+1
Christian National Union Party	62,470	5.67	9	8,278	6.06	1				10	–72
Independent Smallholders, Agrarian Workers and Civic Party	61,266	5.56	4	5,427	3.97	1				5	New
Christian Socialist Party	48,653	4.41	5	4,212	3.08	0	12,460	3.17	1	6	+3
Alliance of Christian Unity							59,508	15.14	5	5	New
Party of Independence and '48	23,795	2.16	1	5,674	4.15	0	3,751	0.95	0	1	+1
'48 Smallholders Party	26,972	2.45	2							2	New
National Civic Party	7,482	0.68	1	5,809	4.25	1	9,473	2.41	0	2	New
Christian Opposition	6,780	0.61	1				13,830	3.52	1	2	New
National Defence Party	4,644	0.42	0				3,423	0.87	0	0	0
Hungarian Workers' Party	7,768	0.70	1							1	0
Christian Agricultural Workers and Craftsmen Party	3,584	0.33	1							1	New
Liberal Opposition	2,929	0.27	1							1	New
National Democratic Party				1,944	1.42	0				0	–
Economic Policy Party							7,545	1.92	0	0	New
Christian National Party							3,547	0.90	0	0	–2
Hungarian National Socialist Bloc							1,423	0.36	0	0	0
Independents	113,673	10.31	22	32,163	23.53	4				26	+14
Total	1,102,680	100.00	195	136,691	100.00	20	392,933	100.00	30	245	+26
Valid votes	1,102,680	100.00					392,933	96.76			
Invalid/blank votes	0	0.00					13,167	3.24			
Total votes	1,102,680	100.00					406,100	100.00			
Registered voters/turnout	1,553,184	70.99		153,024	–		444,710	91.32			
Source: Nohlen & Stöver
