= Károly Huszár =

Hungarian Prime Minister from 1919 to 1920

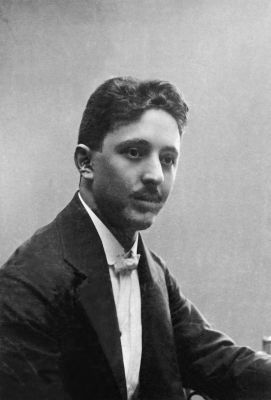
- Huszár c. 1910

Acting Head of State of Hungary
- In office 24 November 1919 – 1 March 1920
- Prime Minister: Himself
- Preceded by: István Friedrich
- Succeeded by: Miklós Horthy (as Regent of Hungary)

Prime Minister of Hungary
- In office 24 November 1919 – 15 March 1920
- Head of State: Himself (acting); Miklós Horthy
- Preceded by: István Friedrich
- Succeeded by: Sándor Simonyi-Semadam

Personal details
- Born: 10 September 1882 Nussdorf, Upper Austria, Austria-Hungary
- Died: 27 October 1941 (aged 59) Budapest, Kingdom of Hungary
- Party: Christian Socialist Party; Catholic People's Party (hu); Unity Party; KNEP
- Spouse: Ilona Mezviczky
- Occupation: Politician; teacher

Károly Huszár de Sárvár (Hungarian: [ˈhusaːr ˈkaːroj], born as Károly Schorn, 10 September 1882 – 27 October 1941) was a Hungarian politician who served as prime minister and acting Head of State of Hungary from November 1919 to March 1920. His tenure coincided with a period of political instability in Hungary immediately after World War I, during which several successive governments ruled the country.

== Early life ==
Huszár was born on 10 September 1882 in Nussdorf on the outskirts of Vienna, the then capital of the Austro-Hungarian Empire. He was trained as a teacher, and from 1903 he participated in the activities of the Christian socialist peasant movements.

== Early career ==
Between 1910 and 1918, he was deputy of the Christian National Party in the Hungarian Parliament and editor-in-chief of his publication, Néppart. He fought as a volunteer on several fronts during the First World War. In the cabinet of János Hadik, the last of the Kingdom of Hungary, he ephemerally assumed the Ministry of Education and Religions.

After the establishment of the Hungarian Soviet Republic in March 1919, he was arrested; he was released later, and went into exile in Vienna. After the end of the Hungarian Soviet Republic, he took again the Ministry of Education and Religions in the government of István Friedrich, between August and November 1919. He was then one of the leaders of the Christian National Union Party (KNEP), the ruling party for most of the 1920s.

== Government ==
=== Cabinet formation ===
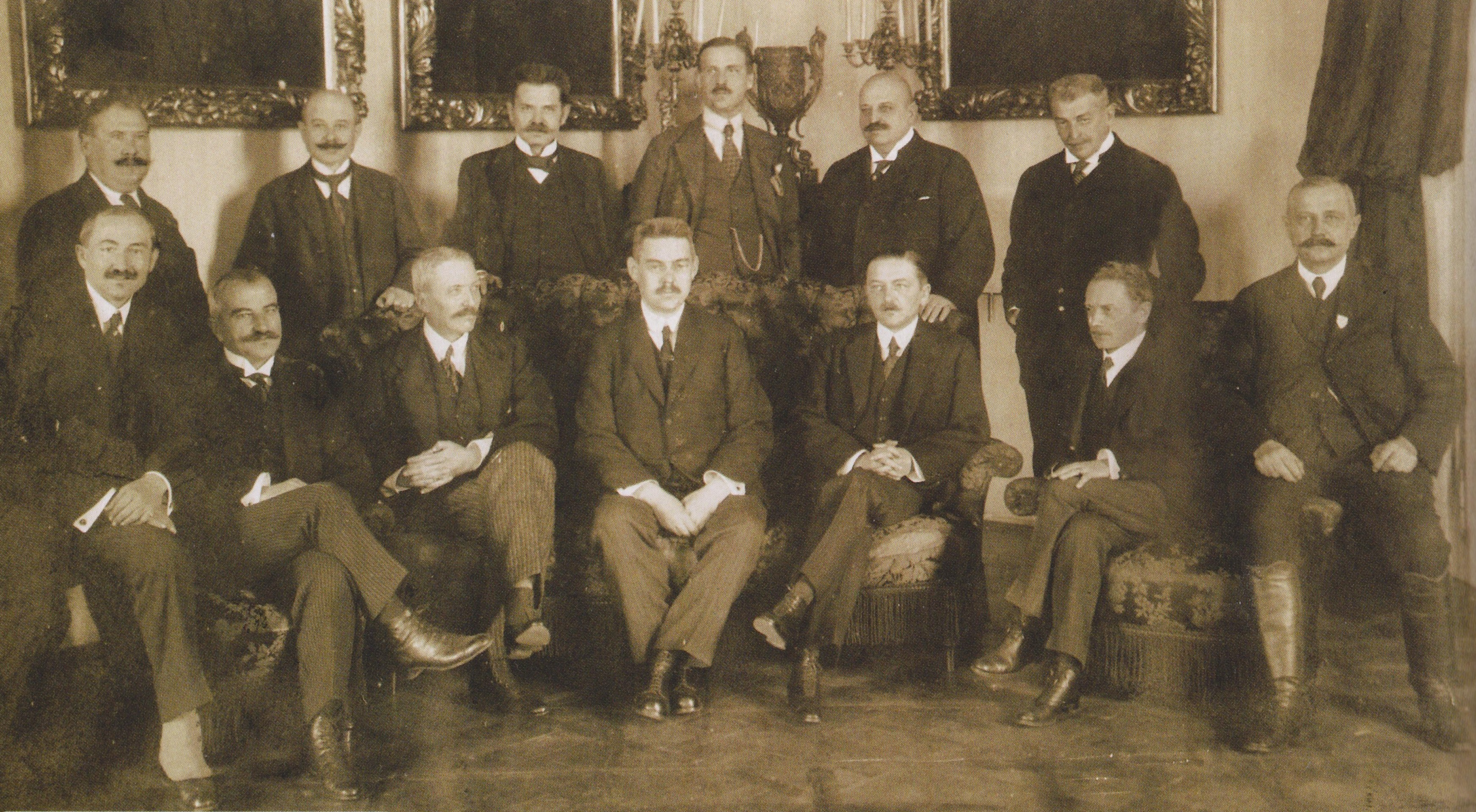
The cabinet of Huszár

The small counterrevolutionary National Army under Miklós Horthy entered Budapest two days after the withdrawal of the Romanian Army on 14 November 1919, which evacuated the city after looting. Thanks to the mediation of the envoy of the Entente, a coalition government was formed on 23 November with Huszár as its head, despite no political experience in this area, although he had once been a teacher. The previous president of the government, István Friedrich, was relieved by his ambition, which collided with that of Horthy, and he inspired little confidence in Horthy because of his previous closeness to Mihály Károlyi. The new government included the Party of Smallholders, National-Democrats (Liberals) and Social-Democrats, among others, and was intended to be a transitional cabinet until the future elections to be held by extended suffrage (39.2% of the population, including, for the first time, women) and secret ballot. Friedrich remained in the Council of Ministers and was responsible for defence, a position unimportant since the army obeyed Horthy. His party, the KNEP, however, was the one that maintained the largest number of portfolios and the most important ones. Friedrich and the other KNEP supporters (including the high nobility of the North and West and the Catholic Church) were to dominate power by controlling the cabinet, as would have happened if Horthy had kept his promise to surrender control from the armed forces to the government.

The executive had little control over the bands which travelled across the country spreading the White Terror, whose victims included Jews. In December Huszár enacted a decree allowing the arrest of any person representing a "danger to public order" which led to the arrest without charge of thousands of people, including the most prominent Social-Democrats still in the country.

Parliamentary elections
(25-27 January 1920)
(seats)
Según Szilassy
Party of Smallholders
Christian National Union Party
Democratic Party
Independents

=== Parliamentary elections and establishment of Horthy ===
In the face of persecution and a lack of support in the countryside, the Social Democrats decided not to stand for election, which the progressive parties still won. The Social Democrats had remained in government only because of the country's grave situation and with the aim of moderating counterrevolutionary tendencies, but on 18 December 1919, they had been about to withdraw their ministers from the cabinet, which they eventually did the following month, on 15 January, before the political trials, electoral irregularities and the attack on the printing press of the party.

The January elections gave a small majority to the Party of Smallholders, contrary to the Habsburgs and against the Christian National Union Party, monarchic and favourable to the dynasty. The result augured a future crisis between both tendencies, despite the disinterest of the majority of the population who were impoverished by the condition of the state. On 1 March 1920 and after a lobbying campaign in favour of Horthy and the intimidation of the parliament, they voted overwhelmingly for Miklós Horthy for the new post of regent of the kingdom (131 votes of 141). Troops loyal to Horthy surrounded the House during the voting. Huszár took the side of Horthy versus those who preferred the return of the king-emperor.

=== The peace treaty ===
The government was invited to participate in the Paris Peace Conference on 2 December. Both Horthy and Huszár were convinced of the need to sign the peace treaty, the conditions of which were presented to the Hungarian delegation on 16 January. The conference had approved the clauses almost a year before 26 February 1919, and these were based on the premise of self-determination of minorities, regardless of other criteria such as geographical or economic. The government of Huszár denied that the minorities wished to join neighbouring countries and that they constituted majorities in some of the areas planned to be transferred over to them, and he requested the holding of plebiscites (October to February 1920). The peace conference rejected his allegations one month later, and on 6 March confirmed the wording of the treaty. On 14 March 1920, a new coalition government with left and right forces took over, with Sándor Simonyi-Semadam at the front of the new ministry. Huszár had resigned that day so he would not have to sign the peace treaty.

During Simonyi-Semadam's rule (Act I of 1920), the Habsburg dynasty in Hungary remained abolished, Hungary was officially separated from Austria and the head of state became a regent (Miklós Horthy from 1 March 1920). All the laws promulgated during the Hungarian People's Republic (Mihály Károlyi, Gyula Peidl) and the Hungarian Soviet Republic were repealed.

=== After the government ===
Between 1920 and 1928, he was deputy and vice-president of the Hungarian National Assembly. He then transferred to the Diet. Between 1928 and 1934, he presided over the National Institute of Social Security. He died, after gradually withdrawing from politics, on 27 October 1941 in the capital.

== Bibliography ==
- Albertini, Béla (2005). Az első magyar "szociofotó" album. (in Hungarian). Budapesti Negyed 47–48. Volume: A bűnös Budapest.
- Macartney, C. A. (1957). October fifteenth: a history of modern Hungary, 1929-1945. Part I. Edinburgh University Press.
- Mócsy, István I. (1983). The Uprooted: Hungarian Refugees and Their Impact on Hungary's Domestic Politics, 1918-1921. EAST EUROPEAN MONOGRAPHS. Brooklyn College Press. ISBN 0-88033-039-2.
- Roszkowski, Wojciech; Kofman, Jan (2016). Biographical Dictionary of Central and Eastern Europe in the Twentieth Century. Routledge. ISBN 9781317475941.
- Szilassy, Sándor (1969). "Hungary at the Brink of the Cliff 1918-1919". East European Quarterly. 3 (1): 95–109.
- Szilassy, Sándor (1971). Revolutionary Hungary 1918–1921. Aston Park, Florida: Danubian Press. ISBN 978-08-79-34005-6.

Political offices
Preceded by Sándor Imre	Minister of Religion and Education; 1919	Succeeded by István Haller
Preceded by István Friedrich	Acting Head of State of Hungary; 1919–1920	Succeeded by Miklós Horthy
Preceded by István Friedrich	Prime Minister of Hungary; 1919–1920	Succeeded by Sándor Simonyi-Semadam
