= Ferenc Schnetzer =

Hungarian military officer and politician

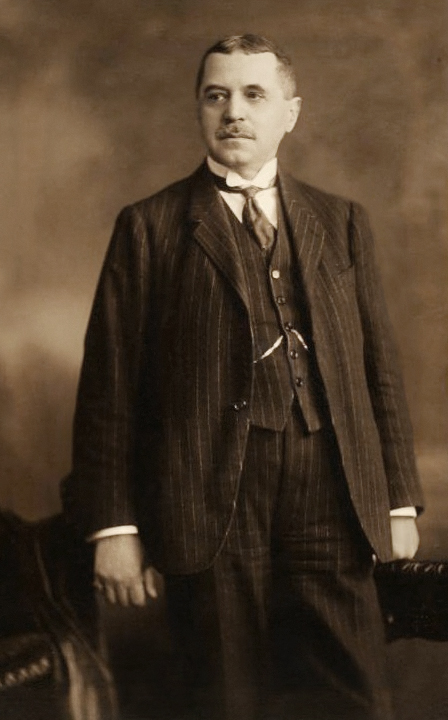
- Ferenc Schnetzer in 1917
- Born: 26 October 1867; Baja, Austria-Hungary
- Died: 3 April 1944 (aged 76); Budapest, Hungary
- Military career
- Allegiance: Hungary
- Rank: General
- Conflicts: White Terror

Ferenc Schnetzer (26 October 1867 – 3 April 1944) was a Hungarian military officer and politician, who served as Minister of Defence in 1919, during the Romanian occupation of Hungary. He took part in the Friedrich's coup against cabinet of Gyula Peidl.

Political offices
| Preceded by Sándor Belitska | Minister of War; 1919 | Succeeded by István Friedrich |
