= National Civic Party (Hungary) =

1920s Hungarian political party

The National Civic Party (Hungarian: Nemzeti Polgári Párt, NPP) was a political party in Hungary during the early 1920s.

== History ==
The party was established in 1922, winning two seats in the parliamentary elections that year. The seats were won by Ferenc Heinrich and István Szentpáli.

After 1922 the party did not contest any further national elections.
