= Liberal Opposition =

1920s political party in Hungary

The Liberal Opposition (Hungarian: Liberális Ellenzék, LE) was a political party in Hungary during the early 1920s.

== History ==
The party first contested national elections in 1922, winning a single seat in the parliamentary elections that year. It did not contest any further national elections.
