= First Hungarian Republic =

1918–1919 unrecognized state in Central Europe

Coordinates: 47°29′N 19°02′E

Hungarian People's Republic Magyar Népköztársaság
- 1918–1919
- Flag Coat of arms
- Anthem: Himnusz (English: "Hymn")
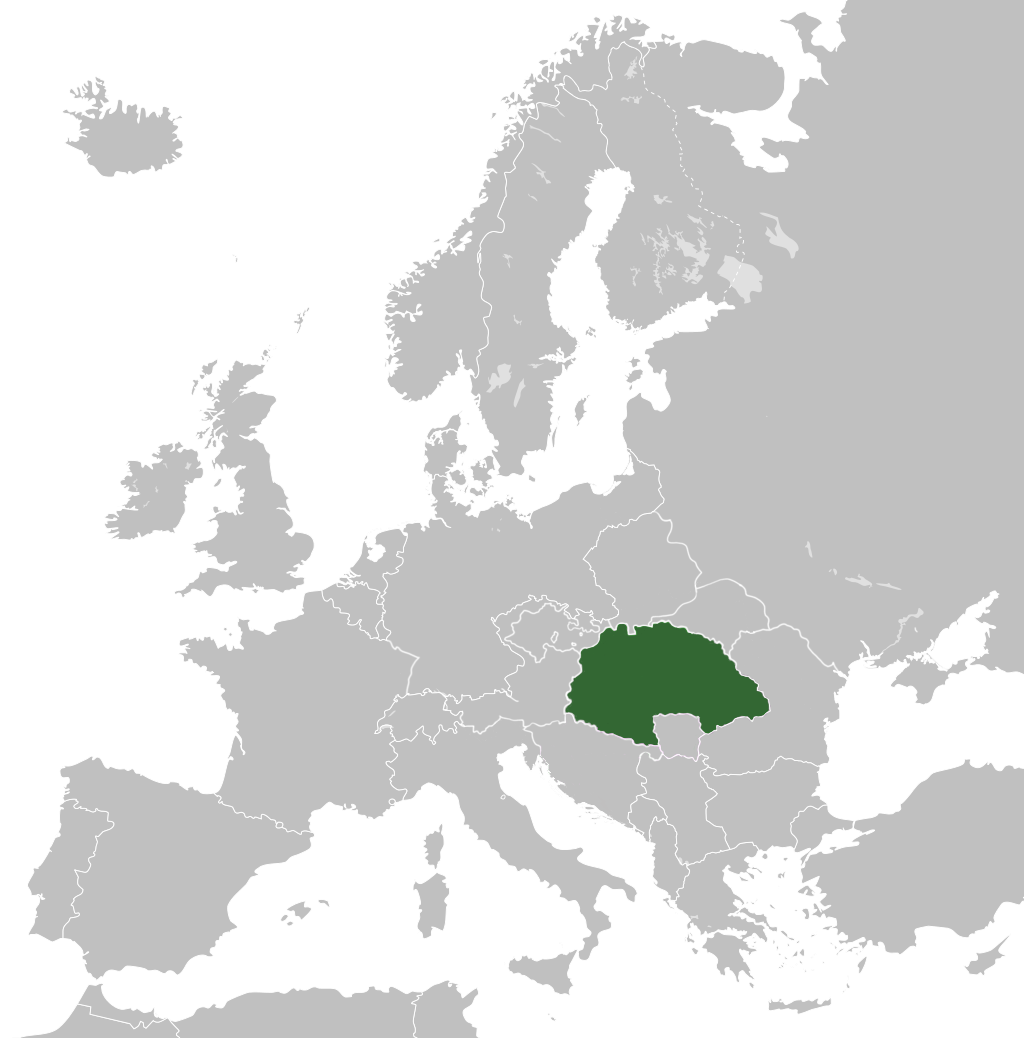
- Hungarian territory in November 1918
- Status: Unrecognized rump state
- Capital: Budapest
- Official language: Hungarian
- Common languages: German; Slovak; Croatian; Romanian
- Demonym: Hungarian
- Government: People's republic
- President
  - Nov. 1918 – Mar. 1919: Mihály Károlyi
  - Mar. 1919 – Aug. 1919: interregnum
  - Aug. 1919: Gyula Peidl (acting)
- Prime Minister
  - Oct. 1918 – Jan. 1919: Mihály Károlyi (first)
  - Aug. 1919: István Friedrich (last)
- Legislature: National Council
- Historical era: Interwar period
  - Aster Revolution: 31 October 1918
  - Establishment: 16 November 1918
  - Beginning of the Hungarian–Romanian War: 13 November 1918
  - Beginning of the Hungarian–Czechoslovak War: November 1918
  - Vix Note: 26 February 1919
  - Soviet overthrow: 21 March 1919
  - Re-establishment: 1 August 1919
  - Nationalist overthrow: 8 August 1919

Area
  - Total: 282,870 km^{2} (109,220 sq mi) (Note: In 1918. (Tarsoly 1995, pp. 595–597.))

Population
  - 1920: 7,980,143
- Currency: Austro-Hungarian korona (until 1919); Hungarian korona
Preceded by	Succeeded by
Nov. 1918: Kingdom of Hungary; Aug. 1919: Soviet Hungary	Mar. 1919: Soviet Hungary; Aug. 1919: Hungarian Republic
- Today part of: Hungary

The First Hungarian Republic (Hungarian: Első Magyar Köztársaság), until 21 March 1919 the Hungarian People's Republic (Magyar Népköztársaság), was the short-lived unrecognized Hungarian state, which quickly transformed into a small rump state due to the foreign and military policy of the doctrinaire pacifist Károlyi government. It existed from 16 November 1918 until 8 August 1919, apart from a 133-day interruption in the form of the Hungarian Soviet Republic. The republic was established in the wake of the dissolution of Austria-Hungary following World War I as a replacement for the Kingdom of Hungary. During the rule of Count Mihály Károlyi's pacifist cabinet, Hungary lost control over approximately 75% of its former pre-World War I territories, which was about 325,411 km^{2} (125,642 sq mi), without armed resistance and was subjected to unhindered foreign occupation. It was in turn succeeded by the Hungarian Soviet Republic but re-established following its demise, and ultimately replaced by the Hungarian Republic.

== Name ==
President Mihály Károlyi's speech after the proclamation of the First Hungarian Republic on 16 November, 1918

Béla Linder's pacifist speech and declaration of self-disarmament on 2 November 1918

Protest of the Transylvanian National Council against the occupation of Transylvania to Romania on 22 December 1918

"Hungarian People's Republic" was adopted as the official name of the country on 16 November 1918, and remained in use until the overthrow of the Dénes Berinkey government on 21 March 1919. Following the collapse of the Hungarian Soviet Republic, the Gyula Peidl government restored the pre-communist name of the state on 2 August 1919.

The government of István Friedrich changed the name to "Hungarian Republic" on 8 August; however, the denomination "Hungarian People's Republic" appeared on some government-issued decrees during this period.

== History ==
=== Károlyi era ===
The Hungarian People's Republic was created by the Aster Revolution, which started in Budapest on 31 October 1918. That day, King Charles IV appointed the revolt's leader, Mihály Károlyi, as Hungarian prime minister. Almost his first act was to formally terminate the personal union between Austria and Hungary. On 13 November, Charles issued a proclamation withdrawing from Hungarian politics. A few days later the provisional government proclaimed Hungary a people's republic, with Károlyi as both prime minister and interim president. This event ended 400 years of rule by the House of Habsburg.

The Hungarian Royal Honvéd army still had more than 1,400,000 soldiers when Mihály Károlyi was announced as prime minister of Hungary. Károlyi yielded to U.S. President Woodrow Wilson's demand for pacifism by ordering the unilateral self-disarmament of the Hungarian army. This happened under the direction of Béla Linder, (minister of war) on 2 November 1918. Due to the full disarmament of its army, Hungary was to remain without a national defence at a time of particular vulnerability. The Hungarian self-disarmament made the occupation of Hungary directly possible for the relatively small armies of Romania, the Franco-Serbian army and the armed forces of the newly established Czechoslovakia.

The Károlyi government's measures failed to stem popular discontent, especially when the Entente powers began distributing slices of what many considered Hungary's traditional territory to the majority ethnic groups in Kingdom of Romania, the Kingdom of Serbs, Croats and Slovenes, and the First Czechoslovak Republic. The new government and its supporters had pinned their hopes for maintaining Hungary's territorial integrity on the abandonment of Cisleithania and Germany, the securing of a separate peace, and exploiting Károlyi's close connections in the French Third Republic. When Károlyi appointed Oszkár Jászi as the new Minister for National Minorities of Hungary, Jászi immediately offered democratic referendums about the disputed borders for minorities, however, the political leaders of those minorities refused the very idea of democratic referendums regarding disputed territories at the Paris peace conference. After the Hungarian self-disarmament, Czech, Serbian, and Romanian political leaders chose to attack Hungary instead of holding democratic plebiscites concerning the disputed areas.

Military and political events changed rapidly and drastically after Hungarian disarmament:

- on 5 November 1918, the Serbian army, with the help of the French army, crossed the southern borders
- on 8 November, the Czechoslovak Army crossed the northern borders
- on 13 November, the Romanian army crossed the eastern borders

The Entente considered Hungary a partner in the defeated Dual Monarchy, and dashed the Hungarians' hopes with the delivery of successive diplomatic notes. Each demanded the surrender of more land to other ethnic groups. On 20 March 1919, the French head of the Entente mission in Budapest gave Károlyi a note delineating the final postwar boundaries, which the Hungarians found unacceptable. Károlyi and Prime Minister Dénes Berinkey were now in an impossible position. They knew accepting the French note would endanger the country's territorial integrity, but were in no position to reject it. In protest, Berinkey resigned.

Károlyi informed the cabinet that only the Hungarian Social Democratic Party could possibly form a new government. Unknown to Károlyi, however, the Social Democrats had merged with the Hungarian Communist Party; the latter promised that the Russian SFSR would help Hungary to restore its original borders. Although the Social Democrats held a majority in the newly merged Hungarian Socialist Party, the communists led by Béla Kun immediately seized control and announced the establishment of the Hungarian Soviet Republic on 21 March 1919.

=== Re-establishment and dissolution ===
After the fall of the Soviet Republic on 1 August 1919, a social democratic government—the so-called "trade union government"—came to power under the leadership of Gyula Peidl. A decree was issued on 2 August restoring the form of government and the official state name back to "People's Republic". During its brief existence, the Peidl government began to abrogate the edicts passed by the Communist regime.

On 6 August, István Friedrich, leader of the White House Comrades Association—a right-wing, counter-revolutionary group—seized power in a bloodless coup with the backing of the Royal Romanian Army. The next day, Joseph August declared himself regent of Hungary—he held the position until 23 August, when he was forced to resign—and appointed Friedrich as Prime Minister. The state was formally dissolved by the new government on 8 August 1919.

== See also ==
- Hungary between the World Wars
- Revolutions and interventions in Hungary
- Red Terror in Hungary
- White Terror in Hungary
