= Hungarian Workers' Party (defunct) =

The Hungarian Workers' Party (Hungarian: Magyarországi Munkáspárt, MMP) was a political party in Hungary during the early 1920s.

== History ==
The party first contested national elections in 1920 as the Hungarian National Workers' Party (Magyar Munkások Országos Pártja), winning a single seat in the parliamentary elections that year. By the 1922 elections it had been renamed the Hungarian Workers' Party. It retained its single seat, but it did not contest any further national elections.
