= Christian Social and Economic Party =

Former political party in Hungary

The Christian Social and Economic Party (Keresztény Szociális és Gazdasági Párt, pronounced [ˈkɛrɛsteːɲ ˈsot͡sijaːliʃ ˈeːʃ ˈɡɒzdɒʃaːɡi ˈpaːrt], KSZGP) was a short-lived political party in Hungary.

== History ==
Founded on 25 August 1919, already dissolved on 25 October 1919 and merged with the Christian National Party to form the Christian National Union Party.
