= Christian Agricultural Workers and Craftsmen Party =

Hungarian political party

The Christian Agricultural Workers and Craftsmen Party (Hungarian: Keresztény Földmíves és Iparos Párt, KFIP) was a political party in Hungary during the early 1920s.

== History ==
The party first contested national elections in 1922, winning a single seat in the parliamentary elections that year.

After 1922 the party did not contest any further national elections.
