= Alliance of Christian Unity =

Hungarian political party

The Alliance of Christian Unity (Hungarian: Keresztény Egység Tábora, KET) was a political party in Hungary during the early 1920s.

== History ==
The party first contested national elections in 1922, winning five seats in the parliamentary elections that year.

After 1922 the KET did not contest any further national elections.
