= Andrássy-Friedrich Party =

Political party in 1920s Hungary

The Christian National Agricultural Workers' and Civic Party (Keresztény Nemzeti Földmíves és Polgári Párt), more commonly known as the Andrássy-Friedrich Party (Andrássy-Friedrich Párt, AFP) after the leaders, Gyula Andrássy the Younger and István Friedrich, was a political party in Hungary during the early 1920s.

== History ==
The party first contested national elections in 1922, winning eleven seats in the parliamentary elections that year, making it the third largest faction in Parliament.

Despite the party's success, it did not contest any further national elections.
