= National Smallholders and Agrarian Workers Party =

The National Smallholders and Agrarian Workers Party (OKGFP) (Hungarian: Országos Kisgazda- és Földműves Part) was a Hungarian political party that existed from 1919 to 1922. During its brief existence it was one of the most popular parties in Hungary, and then it merged to become the Unity Party.

== '48 Smallholders Party ==
The antecedent of OKGFP was formed around 1909 in Transdanubia by peasant politician István Szabó de Nagyatád. It was called the '48 Smallholders Party (Hungarian: 48-as Kisgazda Párt, 48KGP). Szabó thought the word "peasant" was insulting so he used the term "smallholder" instead, in contrast to wealthy large land holders. The "'48" was in reference to the Revolutions of 1848. The party did not reject the system of big estates, but envisioned a more equal distribution of land, and suffrage. It tended towards democratic reforms. Szabó gained a seat in Parliament.

== National Smallholders and Agrarian Workers Party ==
After World War I, Szabó formed the National Smallholders and Agrarian Workers Party (OKGFP) in January 1919 in preparation for the 1920 elections. It was one of the most popular parties in the country and mostly won the elections of 1920. It joined a government coalition, and in 1922 merged with the Christian National Union Party to form the Christian Farmers, Smallholders and Civic Party, known as the Unity Party. Szabó was the first chairman of the newly formed Unity Party.
