= National Democratic Party (Hungary) =

The National Democratic Party (Hungarian: Nemzeti Demokrata Párt) was a political party in Hungary.

== History ==
The original National Democratic Party was active in the early 1920s. In the 1920 elections it won six seats, becoming the third-largest faction in Parliament. The 1922 elections saw the party run alone in single-member constituencies, but on a joint list with the Independent Party of Smallholders, Workers and Citizens in multi-member constituencies in and around Budapest. Although it failed to win a seat in the single-member constituencies, the joint list won seven seats.

The 1926 elections saw the party run only in alliance with the Independent Party of Smallholders, Workers and Citizens under the name "United Left", with the joint list winning nine seats. The party contested the 1931 elections alone, winning two seats. The 1935 elections saw it run in alliance with the National Democratic Party again, this time under the name "Liberal and Democratic Opposition", with the alliance winning seven seats.

A new party was established in March 1996, but did not contest any national elections.
