= István Haller =

Hungarian politician

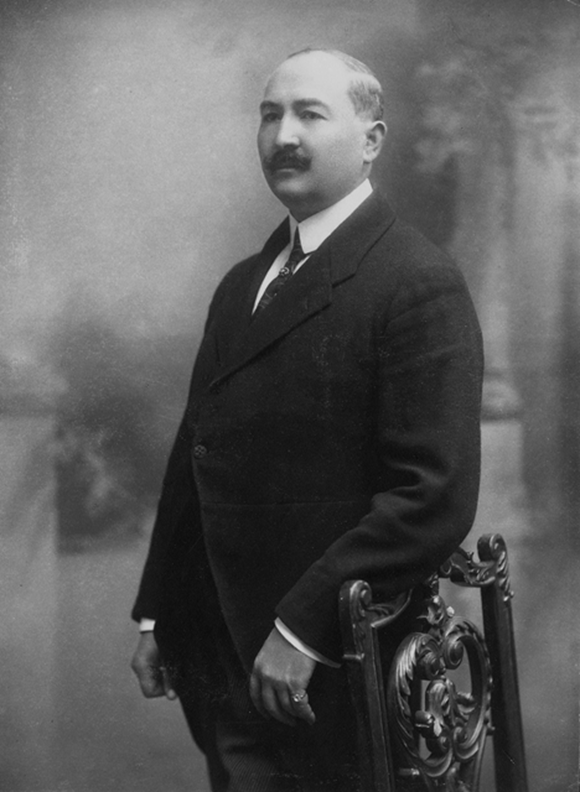

Minister of Religion and Education of Hungary
- In office 24 November 1919 – 16 December 1920
- Prime Minister: Károly Huszár; Sándor Simonyi-Semadam; Pál Teleki
- Preceded by: Károly Huszár
- Succeeded by: József Vass

Personal details
- Born: 18 November 1880 Mezőpetri, Austria-Hungary
- Died: 5 March 1964 (aged 83) Budapest, People's Republic of Hungary
- Party: KNEP
- Profession: politician, journalist

István Haller (18 November 1880 – 5 March 1964) was a Hungarian politician, who served as Minister of Religion and Education between 1919 and 1920.

== Biography ==
He prepared the law of Numerus clausus and submitted for the Diet of Hungary. The Hungarian Numerus Clausus was introduced in 1920. The policy is often seen as the first anti-Jewish Act of 20th-century Europe. Though the text did not use the term "Jew", it was nearly the only group overrepresented in higher education. Its aim was to restrict the number of Jews to 6%, which was their proportion in Hungary at that time; the rate of Jewish students was 25–40% in the 1910s in different faculties. Haller became chairman of the KNEP in 1920, but soon lost his mandate.

Political offices
Preceded by Károly Huszár	Minister of Religion and Education; 1919–1920	Succeeded by József Vass
