= Civic Freedom Party =

Civic Freedom Party Polgári Szabadságpárt
- Founded: 1921
- Dissolved: 1944
- Succeeded by: Civic Democratic Party
- Ideology: Liberalism
- Political position: Centre

The Civic Freedom Party (Hungarian: Polgári Szabadságpárt) was one of the two inter-war liberal parties in Hungary.

== History ==
The party was founded in 1921 by Károly Rassay as the Independent Party of Smallholders, Workers and Citizens (Függetlenségi Kisgazda Földműves és Polgári Párt, FKFPP) as an attempt to mobilize voters for liberalism outside the cities. In the 1922 elections it ran alone, winning five seats, and also in alliance with the National Democratic Party, with the joint list winning seven seats.

For the 1926 elections it ran in alliance with the National Democratic Party under the name "United Left", winning nine seats.

Rassay reconstituted the party in 1930 as the National Liberal Party (Nemzeti Szabadelvű Párt), as an attempt to build an alternative to the conservative government. In the 1931 elections it ran as the "Unified Liberal Democratic Party, winning four seats. The 1935 elections saw it run in alliance with the National Democratic Party again, this time under the name "Liberal and Democratic Opposition", with the alliance winning seven seats.

In the 1939 elections the party, now renamed the Civic Freedom Party, ran alone, winning five seats. In 1944 it was dissolved by the Communist Party. It was reformed as the Civic Democratic Party in 1945.

== See also ==
- Liberalism
- Contributions to liberal theory
- Liberalism worldwide
- List of liberal parties
- Liberal democracy
- Liberalism and radicalism in Hungary
