= Christian Socialist Party (Hungary) =

The Christian Socialist Party (Hungarian: Keresztényszocialista Párt, pronounced [ˈkɛrɛsteːɲˈsot͡sijɒliʃtɒ ˈpaːrt], KP) was a political party in Hungary during the early 1920s.

== History ==
The party first contested national elections in 1920, winning three seats in the parliamentary elections that year. In the 1922 elections it won six seats.

The 1931 elections saw the party win a single seat. It did not contest any further elections.
