= Revolutions and interventions in Hungary (1918–1920) =

Post-WWI period in Hungary (1918–20)

- Part of the aftermath of World War I and the Revolutions of 1917–1923
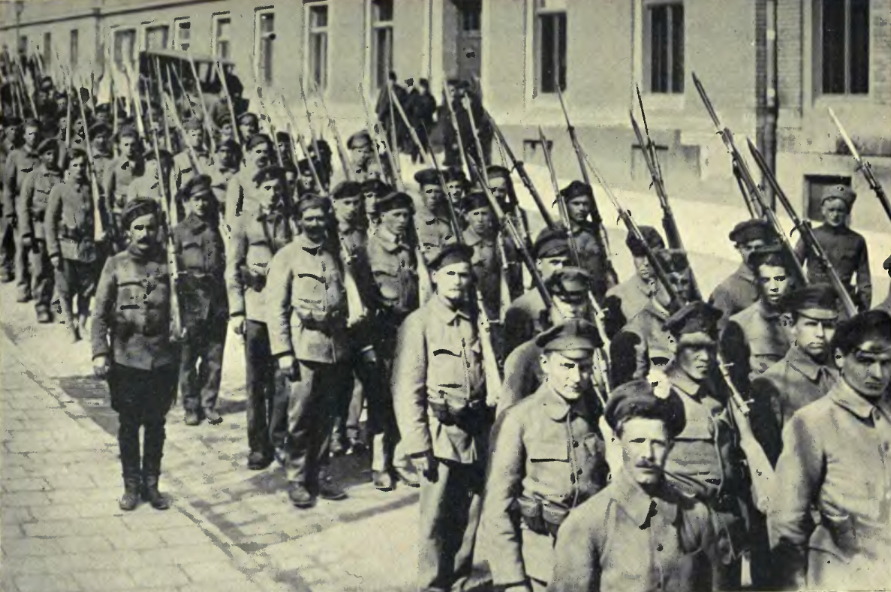
- Heltai's sailors, supporters of the Hungarian revolution
Date	28 October 1918 – 1 March 1920 (1 year, 122 days)
Location	Hungary
Result	Little Entente victory: Collapse of the Hungarian Soviet Republic; Romanian occupation of most of Hungary; Miklós Horthy takes power as Regent of Hungary

Belligerents
Hungarian Republic (Hungarian Soviet Republic) Hungarian SR; Slovak SR	Czechoslovakia (Kingdom of Romania) Romania; State of Slovenes, Croats and Serbs; Kingdom of Serbs, Croats and Slovenes; Republic of Prekmurje; Hutsul Republic Kingdom of Hungary France

Commanders and leaders
Mihály Károlyi (Hungarian Soviet Republic) Béla Kun; Antonín Janoušek	(Czechoslovakia) Tomáš Masaryk (Romania) Ferdinand I (Kingdom of Yugoslavia) Peter I Vilmoš Tkalec; Stepan Klochurak Gyula Károlyi; D. Pattantyús-Ábrahám; Miklós Horthy

Strength
Hungary: 10,000–80,000	Czechoslovakia: 20,000; Romania: 10,000–96,000

Casualties and losses
Hungary: unknown	Czechoslovakia: 1,000; Romania: 11,666

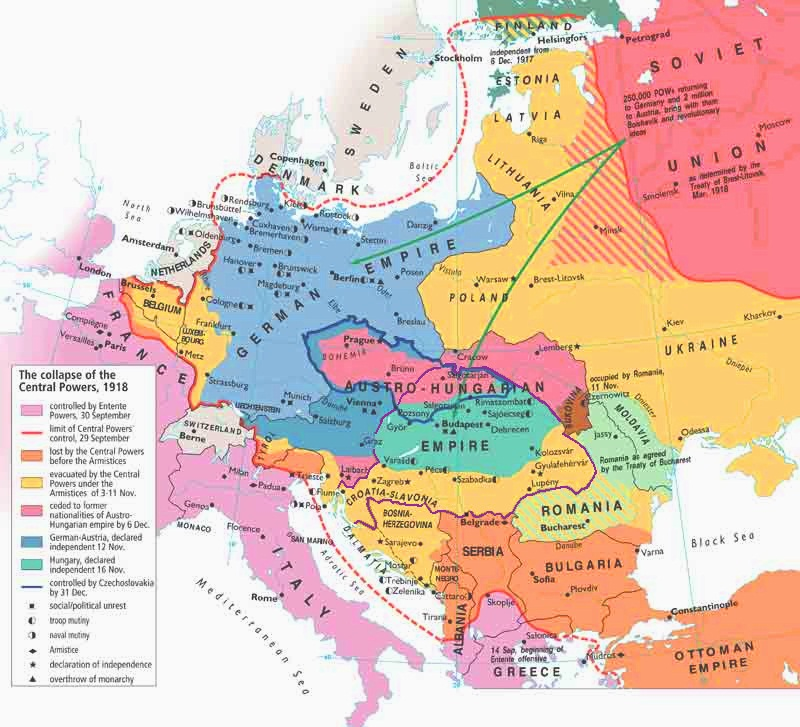
Collapse of Austria-Hungary

There was a period of revolutions and interventions in Hungary between 1918 and 1920. The First Hungarian Republic was founded from the ruins of the Austro-Hungarian Empire by Mihály Károlyi during the Aster Revolution in 1918, at the end of World War I. In March 1919, the republic was overturned by another revolution, and the Hungarian Soviet Republic was created. Unresolved conflicts led to wars between Hungary and its neighbor states (Kingdom of Romania, Kingdom of Serbs, Croats and Slovenes and the evolving Czechoslovakia) in 1919. The Hungarian Soviet Republic ceased to exist after the Romanian occupation. The Kingdom of Hungary was restored in 1920. Hungary signed the Treaty of Trianon in Versailles in the same year.

== Background ==
The dissolution of Austria-Hungary after its defeat in WWI created the volatile and politically unstable atmosphere in Central Europe.

The armistice of Belgrade signed on 13 November 1918 defined a demarcation line marking the southern limit of deployment of most Hungarian armed forces. It left large parts of the Lands of the Crown of Saint Stephen (the Hungarian part of Austria-Hungary) outside Hungarian control – including parts or entire regions of Transylvania, Banat, Bačka, Baranya, as well as Croatia-Slavonia. It also spelled out in eighteen points the obligations imposed on Hungary by the Allies. Those obligations included Hungary's armed forces being reduced to eight divisions, the clearing of naval mines, as well as the turning over of certain quantities of rolling stock, river ships, tugboats, barges, river monitors, horses and other materiel to the Allies. Hungary was also obliged to make certain personnel available to repair wartime damage inflicted on Serbia's telegraph infrastructure, as well as to provide personnel to staff railways.

The terms of the armistice and the subsequent actions of the Allies embittered a significant part of Hungary's population and caused the downfall of the First Hungarian Republic, which had been established only days after its signing. In 1919, the First Hungarian Republic was replaced by the communist-ruled Hungarian Soviet Republic.

== Military conflicts ==
During the war, the Hungarian communists fought separate battles against troops from Czechoslovakia and Romania, and France was also highly involved diplomatically in the conflicts. By the war's final stage, more than 120,000 troops on both sides were involved.

Appealing to Hungarians with promises of regaining the land lost to neighboring countries within a week of his rise to power, Béla Kun declared war upon Czechoslovakia as Hungarian forces invaded Upper Hungary on May 20, capturing southern territories within weeks. In the face of advancing Hungarian troops, the Allies began to put pressure on the Hungarian government, and within three weeks with Kun's assurances of Russian support failing to materialise, Hungary was forced to withdraw from the just-proclaimed Slovak Soviet Republic after Kun had been given an ultimatum by France, together with a guarantee that Romanian forces would retreat from Tiszántúl.

The Romanians disregarded the guarantees of the French leadership and remained on the eastern banks of the Tisza River. The Hungarian government, claiming to impose the will of the Allies on Romania and seeing that it would not be compelled by diplomatic solutions, resolved to clear the threat by military force once and for all. Hungary planned to throw the Romanians out of Tiszántúl, destroy the Romanian Army and even retake Transylvania. However, the Hungarian offensive was defeated by the Romanian Army, and despite all previous pledges, agreements, and guarantees, the Romanians crossed the Tisza and quickly advanced towards the Hungarian capital, Budapest. It fell on August 4, only three days before Kun escaped to Vienna. The destruction of the Hungarian Soviet Republic and the Romanian occupation of parts of Hungary proper, including Budapest in August 1919, ended the war.

The Romanian troops withdrew from Hungary in March 1920 after they had seized large amounts of goods from Hungary, which they regarded as war reparations.

== Prekmurje and Yugoslav Clashes against Hungary ==
See also 1918 occupation of Međimurje and Creation of Yugoslavia

Shortly after the Kingdom of Serbia was liberated, the new Banat republic was proclaimed on 1 November 1918, but it was not able to achieve control over most of the territory it claimed; the Armistice of Belgrade of 15 November and previous Allied promises had mandated Serbian control, and the Serbian army entered western and central parts of Banat (including Temeschwar) and abolished the republic; the Romanian army entered the eastern part of the region. Bačka and Baranja were also handed over to a provisional local Serbian administration that governed from Novi Sad.

Meanwhile a revolt erupted in several villages in the eastern Međimurje and quickly spread across the region among the population. The next day the revolt was suppressed and some of the revolutionaries were executed. On 13 November, the State of Slovenes, Croats and Serbs (Note: United with the Kingdom of Serbia on 1 December to form the Kingdom of Serbs, Croats and Slovenes, officially renamed the Kingdom of Yugoslavia in 1929.) launched an attempt to capture Međimurje. Finally, on 24 December, the Kingdom of Serbs, Croats and Slovenes launched another offensive on Međimurje, which was successful and managed to take control all over Međimurje. The fighting in the region ended after the Yugoslav offensive.

On 29 May, the new Republic of Prekmurje was proclaimed, which was invaded and occupied by the Hungarian Soviet Republic one week after its independence. On 1 August, the Hungarian Soviet Republic was overthrown by Romanian forces, and soon, the Yugoslav Army marched into Prekmurje and ended the communist rule there.

The Treaty of Trianon assigned most of the Baranya region to Hungary, which led to massive protests and to a group of people, under the painter Petar Dobrović, to proclaim a Serb-Hungarian Baranya-Baja Republic. The republic lasted only a few days, and on 25 August 1921 it was invaded and annexed by Hungary, in accordance with Hungarian borders defined by the Treaty of Trianon.

== Aftermath ==
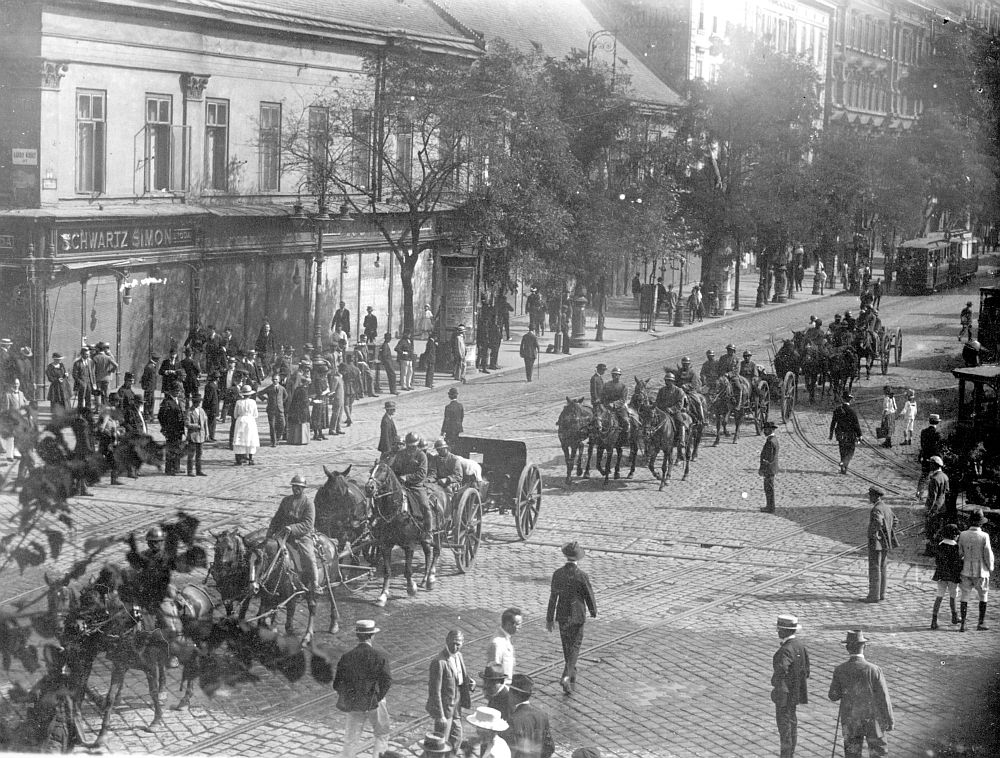
Romanian artillery marching through Budapest

After the Hungarian–Romanian War, the country was totally defeated.

In the name of what they considered to be war reparations, the Romanian government requested the delivery of 50% of the country's rolling stock, 30% of its livestock and 20,000 carloads of fodder and even assessed payment for their expenditures.

By early 1920, it had seized much from Hungary, including food, trucks, locomotives and railroad cars, factory equipment and even the telephones and typewriters from government offices; the Hungarians regarded the Romanian seizures as looting. The Romanian occupation lasted for nearly six months.

After the Romanian occupation, Miklós Horthy's "White Terror" was carried out in response to the previous "Red Terror". The Hungarians had to cede all war materials except weapons that were necessary for the troops under Horthy's command.

== See also ==
- Aftermath of World War I
- Hungarian Soviet Republic
- Miklós Horthy
- Austria-Hungary
- Béla Kun
