= Unity Party (Hungary) =

Ruling party of Hungary (1922–1944)

Unity Party Egységes Párt
- Last logo of the party used after 1939. Logo of the party seen during the early to late 1930s.
- Leader: István Bethlen (1922–1932); Gyula Gömbös (1932–1936); Kálmán Darányi (1936–1938); Béla Imrédy (1938–1939); Pál Teleki (1939-1941); László Bárdossy (1941-1942); Miklós Kállay (1942–1944)
- Founder: István Bethlen
- Founded: 2 February 1922
- Dissolved: 23 March 1944
- Merger of: KNEP (partial) and OKGFP
- Headquarters: Budapest, Hungary
- Ideology: Right-wing big tent; • Hungarian nationalism; • Christian nationalism; • Corporatism; • Anti-communism; Factions: • Conservatism; • National conservatism; • Agrarianism; • Szeged Idea; • Antisemitism
- Political position: 1922–1932: Right-wing; 1932–1944: Far-right

Party flag

The Unity Party (Hungarian: Egységes Párt), officially the Catholic-Protestant Farmers, Smallholders, and Civic Party or Christian Farmers, Smallholders and Civic Party (Hungarian: Keresztény-Keresztyén Földmíves-, Kisgazda- és Polgári Párt), and informally the Government Party (Hungarian: Kormánypárt) was the ruling party of the Kingdom of Hungary from 1922 to 1944. The informal name was given due to it being the party of the government throughout the whole history of the Horthy regime.

It was founded in early 1922, and in the same year they won an electoral landslide in the parliamentary election. Initially, the party was conservative and agrarian but in the early 1930s its fascist faction grew to become the largest, and shortly after they established a militia. The main leader of the fascist faction was Gyula Gömbös, who served as the prime minister from 1932 to 1936. When he came to power, the party was renamed to National Unity Party (Hungarian: Nemzeti Egység Pártja).

Gömbös declared the party's intention to achieve "total control of the nation's social life". In the 1935 Hungarian Election, Gömbös promoted the creation of a "unitary Hungarian nation with no class distinctions". The party won a huge majority of the seats of the Hungarian parliament in the Hungarian election of May 1939. It won 72 percent of the parliament's seats and won 49 percent of the popular vote in the election. This was a major breakthrough for the far-right in Hungary. The party promoted nationalist propaganda and some of its members sympathized with the Nazi Arrow Cross Party. In 1939, the party was renamed to the Hungarian Life Party (Hungarian: Magyar Élet Pártja).

A faction of the most pro-Nazi members led by the party's former leader Béla Imrédy split from the party October 1940 to form the Hungarian Renewal Party (Magyar Megújulás Pártja) that sought to explicitly "solve" the "Jewish Problem."

== Electoral results ==
=== National Assembly ===
Election	Votes			Seats		Rank	Government	Leader
Election	#	%	±pp	#	+/−	Rank	Government	Leader
1922	623,201	38.2%	▲38.2	140 / 245	▲140	1st	Unity Party	István Bethlen
1926	482,086	42.2%	▲4.0	161 / 245	▲21	1st	Unity Party	István Bethlen
1931	603,576	40.0%	▼2.2	149 / 245	▼12	1st	Unity Party	István Bethlen
1935	879,474	44.6%	▲4.6	164 / 245	▲15	1st	Party of National Unity	Gyula Gömbös
1939	1,824,573	49.5%	▲4.9	181 / 260	▲17	1st	Party of Hungarian Life	Pál Teleki
