= List of prime ministers of Hungary =

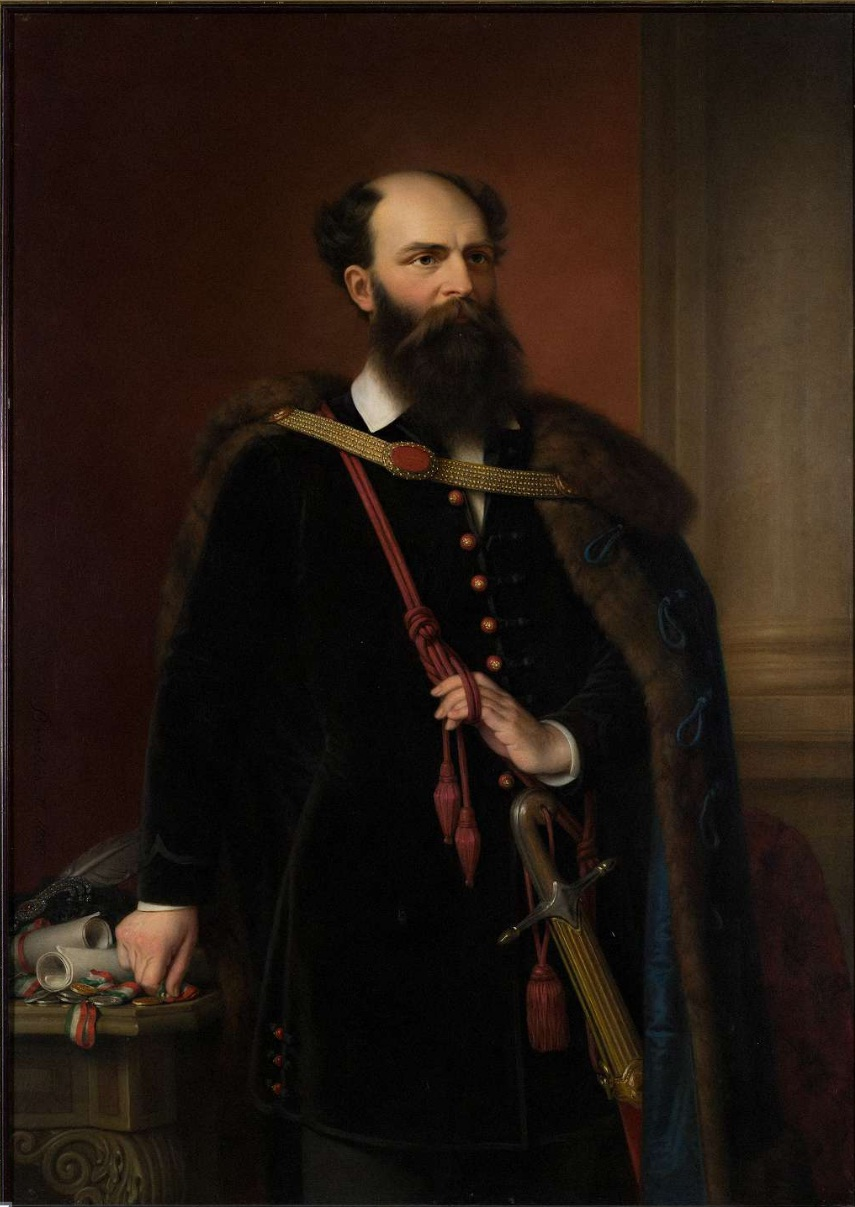
Lajos Batthyány was the first Prime Minister of Hungary.

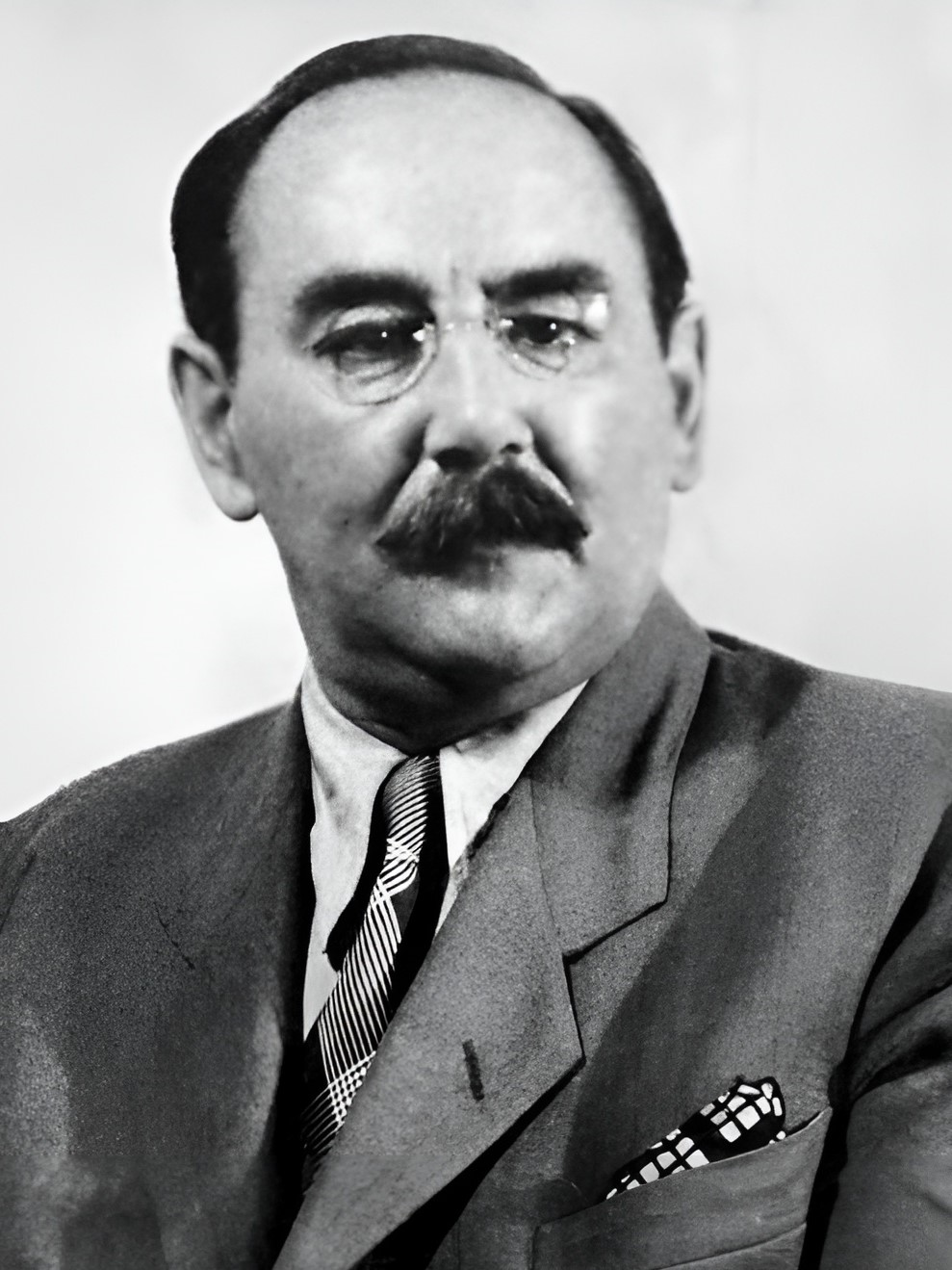
Imre Nagy was the prime minister during the Hungarian Revolution of 1956.

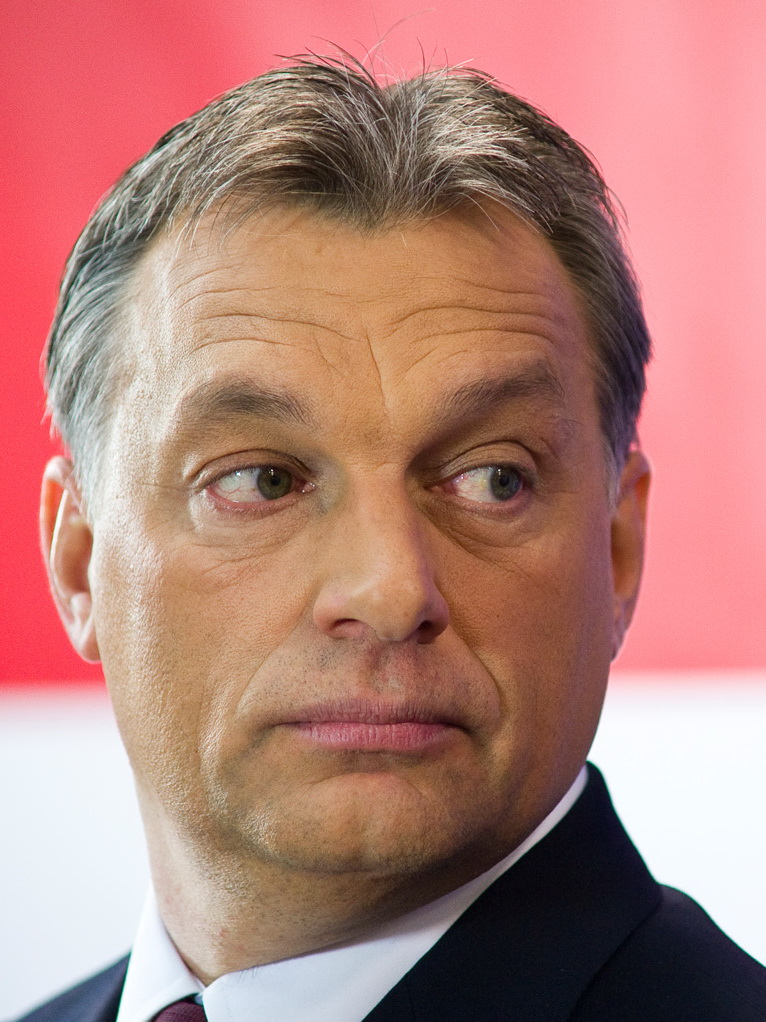
Viktor Orbán was the longest-serving prime minister.

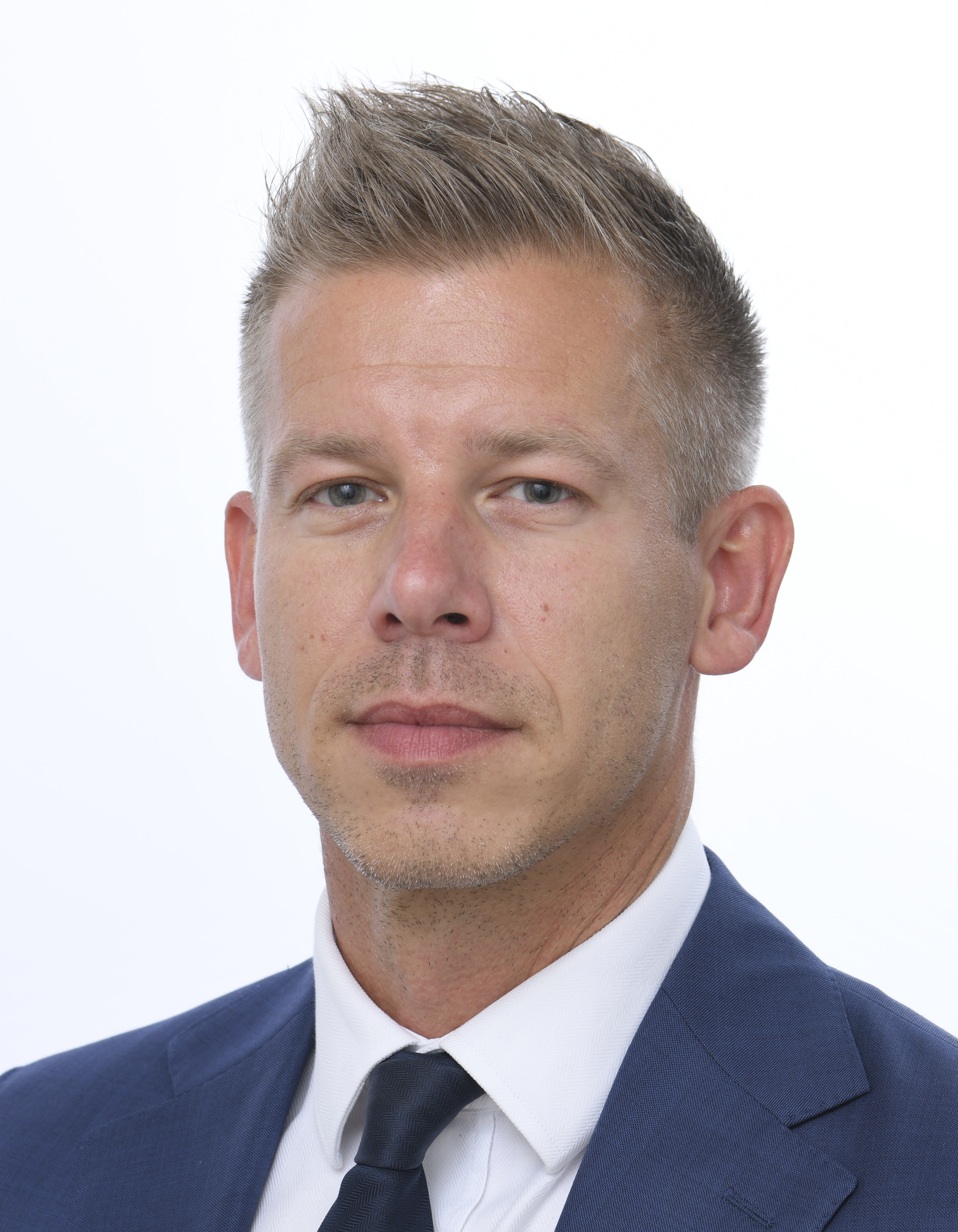
Péter Magyar is the current prime minister.

The prime minister of Hungary (Hungarian: Magyarország miniszterelnöke) is the head of government of Hungary and the leader of the Hungarian cabinet.

== Background ==
The office of prime minister was formally established during the Hungarian Revolution of 1848, under the April Laws sanctioned by King Ferdinand V. The first prime minister was Lajos Batthyány, who took office on 17 March 1848, marking the beginning of constitutional and parliamentary government in Hungary.

Following the outbreak of the revolution, growing tensions between the Hungarian Diet and the Austrian imperial court led to Batthyány's resignation in September 1848. On 3 October 1848, Emperor Ferdinand appointed Count Ádám Récsey as prime minister, though this appointment was made without the approval of the Diet and was therefore unconstitutional under the April Laws.

Récsey attempted to dissolve the Hungarian Diet and reassert royal authority, but his actions were rejected by Hungarian leaders and the revolutionary government led by Lajos Kossuth. His term lasted only a few days. After Emperor Ferdinand abdicated on 7 October 1848 in favor of his nephew Franz Joseph I, Récsey was forced to resign and was briefly arrested.

The office of prime minister was restored following the Austro-Hungarian Compromise of 1867, which created the Lands of the Crown of Saint Stephen within the Dual Monarchy. Since then, the prime minister has remained the head of government, responsible for directing the executive branch and leading the cabinet.

After the collapse of Austria-Hungary in 1918, Hungary experienced several regime changes, including the First Hungarian Republic, the Hungarian Soviet Republic, and the second Kingdom of Hungary without a reigning monarch. The prime minister's role continued throughout these periods, though its powers varied depending on the form of government.

Following World War II, Hungary became a People's Republic under Soviet influence, during which the office of prime minister continued in name but held limited power under the Communist Party. After the fall of communism in 1989, Hungary re-established itself as a democratic parliamentary republic, and the prime minister once again became the head of a freely elected government accountable to the National Assembly.

The current prime minister is Péter Magyar, who has served since 9 May 2026.

== Revolutionary Hungary (1848–1849) ==
Parties EP Military

No.	Portrait	Name (Birth–Death)	Term of office			Party	Election	Cabinet
No.	Portrait	Name (Birth–Death)	Took office	Left office	Tenure	Party	Election	Cabinet
Prime Minister of the Kingdom of Hungary
1		Count; Lajos Batthyány (1807–1849)	17 March 1848	2 October 1848	199 days	Opposition Party (EP)	Last Diet	Batthyány; EP–KP
1		Count; Lajos Batthyány (1807–1849)	17 March 1848	2 October 1848	199 days	Opposition Party (EP)	1848	Batthyány; EP–KP
President of the Committee of National Defence
2		Lajos Kossuth (1802–1894)	2 October 1848	2 May 1849	194 days	Opposition Party (EP)	—	Committee of National Defence; EP–BP
Prime Minister of the Kingdom of Hungary
—		Baron; Ádám Récsey (1775–1852) appointed illegally	3 October 1848	7 October 1848	4 days	Imperial Austrian Army	—	Not formed
3		Bertalan Szemere (1812–1869)	2 May 1849	11 August 1849	101 days	Opposition Party (EP)	—	Szemere; EP–BP

After the collapse of the Hungarian Revolution of 1848, the restored Hungarian Kingdom became an integral part of the Austrian Empire until 1867, when dual Austro-Hungarian Monarchy was created and the Hungarian Kingdom was organized as Lands of the Crown of Saint Stephen.

== Kingdom of Hungary (1867–1918) ==
Parties Deák Party (DP)/Liberal Party (SZP)/National Party of Work (NMP) National Constitution Party (OAP)/48AP Party of Independence and '48 (F48P) Independent

No.	Portrait	Name (Birth–Death)	Term of office			Party	Election	Cabinet
No.	Portrait	Name (Birth–Death)	Took office	Left office	Tenure	Party	Election	Cabinet
Prime Minister of the Kingdom of Hungary
4		Count; Gyula Andrássy (1823–1890)	17 February 1867	14 November 1871	4 years, 270 days	Deák Party (DP)	1865	Andrássy; DP
4		Count; Gyula Andrássy (1823–1890)	17 February 1867	14 November 1871	4 years, 270 days	Deák Party (DP)	1869	Andrássy; DP
5		Count; Menyhért Lónyay (1822–1884)	14 November 1871	4 December 1872	1 year, 20 days	Deák Party (DP)	—	Lónyay; DP
5		Count; Menyhért Lónyay (1822–1884)	14 November 1871	4 December 1872	1 year, 20 days	Deák Party (DP)	1872	Lónyay; DP
6		József Szlávy (1818–1900)	4 December 1872	21 March 1874	1 year, 107 days	Deák Party (DP)	—	Szlávy; DP
7		István Bittó (1822–1903)	21 March 1874	2 March 1875	346 days	Deák Party (DP)	—	Bittó; DP–BK
8		Count; Béla Wenckheim (1811–1879)	2 March 1875	20 October 1875	232 days	Liberal Party (SZP)	—	Wenckheim; SZP
9		Kálmán Tisza (1830–1902)	20 October 1875	13 March 1890	14 years, 144 days	Liberal Party (SZP)	1875	K. Tisza; SZP
9		Kálmán Tisza (1830–1902)	20 October 1875	13 March 1890	14 years, 144 days	Liberal Party (SZP)	1878	K. Tisza; SZP
9		Kálmán Tisza (1830–1902)	20 October 1875	13 March 1890	14 years, 144 days	Liberal Party (SZP)	1881	K. Tisza; SZP
9		Kálmán Tisza (1830–1902)	20 October 1875	13 March 1890	14 years, 144 days	Liberal Party (SZP)	1884	K. Tisza; SZP
9		Kálmán Tisza (1830–1902)	20 October 1875	13 March 1890	14 years, 144 days	Liberal Party (SZP)	1887	K. Tisza; SZP
10		Count; Gyula Szapáry (1832–1905)	13 March 1890	17 November 1892	2 years, 249 days	Liberal Party (SZP)	—	Szapáry; SZP
10		Count; Gyula Szapáry (1832–1905)	13 March 1890	17 November 1892	2 years, 249 days	Liberal Party (SZP)	1892	Szapáry; SZP
11		Sándor Wekerle (1848–1921); 1st term	17 November 1892	14 January 1895	2 years, 58 days	Liberal Party (SZP)	—	Wekerle I SZP
12		Baron; Dezső Bánffy (1843–1911)	14 January 1895	26 February 1899	4 years, 43 days	Liberal Party (SZP)	—	Bánffy; SZP
12		Baron; Dezső Bánffy (1843–1911)	14 January 1895	26 February 1899	4 years, 43 days	Liberal Party (SZP)	1896	Bánffy; SZP
13		Kálmán Széll (1843–1915)	26 February 1899	27 June 1903	4 years, 121 days	Liberal Party (SZP)	—	Széll; SZP
13		Kálmán Széll (1843–1915)	26 February 1899	27 June 1903	4 years, 121 days	Liberal Party (SZP)	1901	Széll; SZP
14		Count; Károly Khuen-Héderváry (1849–1918); 1st term	27 June 1903	3 November 1903	129 days	Liberal Party (SZP)	—	Khuen-Héderváry I SZP
15		István Tisza (1861–1918); 1st term	3 November 1903	18 June 1905	1 year, 227 days	Liberal Party (SZP)	—	I. Tisza I SZP
16		Baron Feldzeugmeister; Géza Fejérváry (1833–1914)	18 June 1905	8 April 1906	294 days	Independent	1905	Fejérváry; SZP
(11)		Sándor Wekerle (1848–1921); 2nd term	8 April 1906	17 January 1910	3 years, 284 days	Constitution Party (OAP)	1906	Wekerle II; F48P–OAP–KNP–PDP
(14)		Count; Károly Khuen-Héderváry (1849–1918); 2nd term	17 January 1910	22 April 1912	2 years, 96 days	National Party of Work (NMP)	1910	Khuen-Héderváry II; NMP
17		László Lukács (1850–1932)	22 April 1912	10 June 1913	1 year, 49 days	National Party of Work (NMP)	—	Lukács; NMP
(15)		Count; István Tisza (1861–1918); 2nd term	10 June 1913	15 June 1917	4 years, 5 days	National Party of Work (NMP)	—	I. Tisza II; NMP
18		Count; Móric Esterházy (1881–1960)	15 June 1917	20 August 1917	66 days	Independent	—	Esterházy; NMP–F48P–OAP–KNP–PDP
(11)		Sándor Wekerle (1848–1921); 3rd term	20 August 1917	30 October 1918	1 year, 71 days	Constitution Party (OAP; 1917–1918) Constitution Party of 48 (48AP; Jan–Oct 1918)	—	Wekerle III; NMP–F48P–OAP→48AP–KNP–PDP
19		Count; János Hadik (1863–1933)	30 October 1918	31 October 1918	1 day (Note: Served as Prime Minister for de facto 17 hours.)	National Constitution Party (OAP)	—	Hadik not formed
20		Count; Mihály Károlyi (1875–1955)	31 October 1918	16 November 1918	16 days	Party of Independence and '48 (F48P)	Hungarian National Council	M. Károlyi; F48P–PRP–MSZDP

== Hungarian People's Republic (1918–1919) ==
Parties F48P PRP (Civil Radical Party)

No.	Portrait	Name (Birth–Death)	Term of office			Party	Election	Cabinet
No.	Portrait	Name (Birth–Death)	Took office	Left office	Tenure	Party	Election	Cabinet
Prime Minister of the Hungarian People's Republic
(20)		Count; Mihály Károlyi (1875–1955) acting head of state	16 November 1918	11 January 1919	56 days	Party of Independence and '48 (F48P)	Hungarian National Council	M. Károlyi; F48P–PRP–MSZDP
21		Dénes Berinkey (1871–1944) (Note: Acting between 11 January and 18 January.)	11 January 1919	18 January 1919	7 days	Civil Radical Party (PRP)	Hungarian National Council	Berinkey caretaker F48P–PRP–MSZDP
21		Dénes Berinkey (1871–1944)	18 January 1919	21 March 1919	62 days	Civil Radical Party (PRP)	Hungarian National Council	Berinkey; F48P–PRP–MSZDP–OKGFP

== Hungarian Soviet Republic (1919) ==
Parties KMP

No.	Portrait	Name (Birth–Death)	Term of office			Party	Assembly	Cabinet
No.	Portrait	Name (Birth–Death)	Took office	Left office	Tenure	Party	Assembly	Cabinet
Chairman of the Revolutionary Governing Council of the Hungarian Soviet Republic
22		Sándor Garbai (1879–1947) head of state	21 March 1919	1 August 1919	133 days	Hungarian Communist Party (KMP)	National Assembly of Soviets	Central Executive Council; KMP

== Counter-revolutionary governments (1919) ==
Parties Independent

No.	Portrait	Name (Birth–Death)	Term of office			Party	Election	Cabinet
No.	Portrait	Name (Birth–Death)	Took office	Left office	Tenure	Party	Election	Cabinet
Prime Minister of the Counter-revolutionary Government of Hungary
—		Gyula Károlyi (1871–1947) in opposition	5 May 1919	31 May 1919	68 days	Independent	—	Arad
—		Gyula Károlyi (1871–1947) in opposition	31 May 1919	6 June 1919	68 days	Independent	—	Szeged I
—		Gyula Károlyi (1871–1947) in opposition	6 June 1919	12 July 1919	68 days	Independent	—	Szeged II
—		Dezső Pattantyús-Ábrahám (1875–1973) in opposition	12 July 1919	12 August 1919	31 days	Independent	—	Szeged III

== Hungarian People's Republic (1919) ==
Parties MSZDP

No.	Portrait	Name (Birth–Death)	Term of office			Party	Election	Cabinet
No.	Portrait	Name (Birth–Death)	Took office	Left office	Tenure	Party	Election	Cabinet
Prime Minister of the Hungarian People's Republic
23		Gyula Peidl (1873–1943) acting head of state	1 August 1919	6 August 1919 (deposed)	5 days	Social Democratic Party of Hungary (MSZDP)	— (Note: Elections were not held as a consequence of the Romanian occupation.)	Peidl; MSZDP

== Hungarian Republic (1919–1920) ==
Parties KNP KNEP Independent

No.	Portrait	Name (Birth–Death)	Term of office			Party	Election	Cabinet
No.	Portrait	Name (Birth–Death)	Took office	Left office	Tenure	Party	Election	Cabinet
Prime Minister of the Hungarian Republic
24		István Friedrich (1883–1951) (Note: Acting between 7 August and 15 August.)	7 August 1919	24 November 1919	109 days	Independent (Aug 1919) Christian National Party (KNP; Aug–Oct 1919) Christian National Union Party (KNEP; Oct–Nov 1919)	—	Friedrich; KNP→KNEP–OKGFP
25		Károly Huszár (1882–1941) acting head of state	24 November 1919	1 March 1920	98 days	Christian National Union Party (KNEP)	—	Huszár; KNEP–OKGFP–MSZDP–NDPP

== Kingdom of Hungary (1920–1946) ==
Parties Christian National Union Party (KNEP) Unity Party (EP)/Party of National Unity (NEP)/Party of Hungarian Life (MÉP) Independent

No.	Portrait	Name (Birth–Death)	Term of office			Party	Election	Cabinet
No.	Portrait	Name (Birth–Death)	Took office	Left office	Tenure	Party	Election	Cabinet
Prime Minister of the Kingdom of Hungary
(25)		Károly Huszár (1882–1941)	1 March 1920	15 March 1920	14 days	Christian National Union Party (KNEP)	—	Huszár; KNEP–OKGFP–MSZDP–NDPP
26		Sándor Simonyi-Semadam (1864–1946)	15 March 1920	19 July 1920	126 days	Christian National Union Party (KNEP)	1920	Simonyi-Semadam; KNEP–OKGFP
27		Count; Pál Teleki (1879–1941); 1st term	19 July 1920	14 April 1921	269 days	Christian National Union Party (KNEP)	—	Teleki I KNEP–OKGFP
28		Count; István Bethlen (1874–1946)	14 April 1921	24 August 1931	10 years, 132 days	Unity Party (EP)	1922	Bethlen (KNEP–OKGFP)→EP
28		Count; István Bethlen (1874–1946)	14 April 1921	24 August 1931	10 years, 132 days	Unity Party (EP)	1926	Bethlen (KNEP–OKGFP)→EP
28		Count; István Bethlen (1874–1946)	14 April 1921	24 August 1931	10 years, 132 days	Unity Party (EP)	1931	Bethlen (KNEP–OKGFP)→EP
29		Count; Gyula Károlyi (1871–1947)	24 August 1931	1 October 1932	1 year, 38 days	Unity Party (EP)	—	G. Károlyi; EP–KGSZP
30		Gyula Gömbös (1886–1936)	1 October 1932	6 October 1936 (died in office)	4 years, 5 days	Unity Party (NEP)	—	Gömbös; NEP
30		Gyula Gömbös (1886–1936)	1 October 1932	6 October 1936 (died in office)	4 years, 5 days	Unity Party (NEP)	1935	Gömbös; NEP
31		Kálmán Darányi (1886–1939)	6 October 1936	12 October 1936	6 days	Unity Party (NEP)	—	Darányi caretaker NEP
31		Kálmán Darányi (1886–1939)	12 October 1936	14 May 1938	1 year, 214 days	Unity Party (NEP)	—	Darányi; NEP
32		Béla Imrédy (1891–1946)	14 May 1938	16 February 1939	278 days	Unity Party (NEP)	—	Imrédy; NEP
(27)		Count; Pál Teleki (1879–1941); 2nd term	16 February 1939	3 April 1941 (died in office)	2 years, 46 days	Party of Hungarian Life (MÉP)	—	Teleki II; MÉP
(27)		Count; Pál Teleki (1879–1941); 2nd term	16 February 1939	3 April 1941 (died in office)	2 years, 46 days	Party of Hungarian Life (MÉP)	1939	Teleki II; MÉP
—		Ferenc Keresztes-Fischer (1881–1948) acting	3 April 1941		0 days	Party of Hungarian Life (MÉP)	—	Keresztes-Fischer caretaker I MÉP
33		László Bárdossy (1890–1946)	3 April 1941	7 March 1942	338 days	Party of Hungarian Life (MÉP)	—	Bárdossy; MÉP
—		Ferenc Keresztes-Fischer (1881–1948) acting	7 March 1942	9 March 1942	2 days	Party of Hungarian Life (MÉP)	—	Keresztes-Fischer caretaker II; MÉP
34		Miklós Kállay (1887–1967)	9 March 1942	22 March 1944 (deposed)	2 years, 13 days	Party of Hungarian Life (MÉP)	—	Kállay; MÉP
35		Döme Sztójay (1883–1946)	22 March 1944	29 August 1944	160 days	Independent	—	Sztójay; MÉP–MMP
36		General; Géza Lakatos (1890–1967)	29 August 1944	16 October 1944 (deposed)	48 days	Independent	—	Lakatos; MÉP

== Government of National Unity (1944–1945) ==
Parties NYKP

No.	Portrait	Name (Birth–Death)	Term of office			Party	Election	Cabinet
No.	Portrait	Name (Birth–Death)	Took office	Left office	Tenure	Party	Election	Cabinet
Prime Minister of the Kingdom of Hungary
37		Ferenc Szálasi (1897–1946) head of state	16 October 1944	7 May 1945 (Note: Left Budapest on 9 December 1944.)	203 days	Arrow Cross Party (NYKP)	—	Szálasi; NYKP–MMP

== Soviet-backed provisional governments (1944–1946) ==
Parties FKGP Independent

No.	Portrait	Name (Birth–Death)	Term of office			Party	Election	Cabinet
No.	Portrait	Name (Birth–Death)	Took office	Left office	Tenure	Party	Election	Cabinet
Prime Minister of the Kingdom of Hungary
38		General; Béla Miklós (1890–1948) (Note: In opposition – disputed with Ferenc Szálasi to 28 March 1945. Also acting head of state until 25 January 1945)	22 December 1944	28 March 1945	96 days	Independent	1944	Provisional Government; FKGP–MKP–MSZDP–NPP–PDP
38		General; Béla Miklós (1890–1948)	28 March 1945	15 November 1945	232 days	Independent	1944	Provisional Government; FKGP–MKP–MSZDP–NPP–PDP
39		Zoltán Tildy (1889–1961)	15 November 1945	1 February 1946	78 days	Independent Smallholders, Agrarian Workers and Civic Party (FKGP)	1945	Tildy; FKGP–MKP–MSZDP–NPP

== Hungarian Republic (1946–1949) ==
Parties MKP FKGP

No.	Portrait	Name (Birth–Death)	Term of office			Party	Election	Cabinet
No.	Portrait	Name (Birth–Death)	Took office	Left office	Tenure	Party	Election	Cabinet
Prime Minister of the Republic of Hungary
—		Mátyás Rákosi (1892–1971) acting	1 February 1946	4 February 1946	3 days	Hungarian Communist Party (MKP)	—	Rákosi caretaker I FKGP–MKP–MSZDP–NPP
40		Ferenc Nagy (1903–1979)	4 February 1946	31 May 1947 (Note: Nagy did not recognize the appointment of Dinnyés as Prime Minister and resigned only on 2 June 1947.) (deposed)	1 year, 116 days	Independent Smallholders, Agrarian Workers and Civic Party (FKGP)	—	F. Nagy; FKGP–MKP–MSZDP–NPP
—		Mátyás Rákosi (1892–1971) acting	31 May 1947 (Note: Took over direction of the Council of Ministers on 14 May 1947 upon Nagy's departure to Switzerland. Became sole Acting Prime Minister upon Nagy's deposition.)		0 days	Hungarian Communist Party (MKP)	—	Rákosi caretaker II; FKGP–MKP–MSZDP–NPP
41		Lajos Dinnyés (1901–1961)	31 May 1947	10 December 1948	1 year, 193 days	Independent Smallholders, Agrarian Workers and Civic Party (FKGP)	—	Dinnyés (MKP–MSZDP)→MDP (Note: The Hungarian Communist Party and Social Democratic Party of Hungary merged to form the Hungarian Working People's Party on 12 June 1948.)–FKGP–NPP
41		Lajos Dinnyés (1901–1961)	31 May 1947	10 December 1948	1 year, 193 days	Independent Smallholders, Agrarian Workers and Civic Party (FKGP)	1947	Dinnyés (MKP–MSZDP)→MDP–FKGP–NPP
42		István Dobi (1898–1968)	10 December 1948	20 August 1949	253 days	Independent Smallholders, Agrarian Workers and Civic Party (FKGP)	—	Dobi; MDP–FKGP–NPP

== Hungarian People's Republic (1949–1989) ==
Parties MDP/MSZMP MSZP Independent

No.	Portrait	Name (Birth–Death)	Term of office			Party	Election	Cabinet
No.	Portrait	Name (Birth–Death)	Took office	Left office	Tenure	Party	Election	Cabinet
Chairman of the Council of Ministers of the Hungarian People's Republic
(42)		István Dobi (1898–1968)	20 August 1949	14 August 1952	2 years, 360 days	Independent	1949	Dobi; MDP
43		Mátyás Rákosi (1892–1971)	14 August 1952	4 July 1953	324 days	Hungarian Socialist Workers' Party (MDP)	—	Rákosi; MDP
44		Imre Nagy (1896–1958); 1st term	4 July 1953	18 April 1955	1 year, 288 days	Hungarian Socialist Workers' Party (MDP)	1953	I. Nagy I MDP
45		András Hegedüs (1922–1999)	18 April 1955	24 October 1956	1 year, 189 days	Hungarian Socialist Workers' Party (MDP)	—	Hegedüs; MDP
(44)		Imre Nagy (1896–1958); 2nd term	24 October 1956	4 November 1956 (deposed) (Note: Nagy never formally resigned, and remained in refuge at the Yugoslav Embassy until 22 November 1956.)	11 days	Hungarian Socialist Workers' Party (MDP; Oct 1956) Hungarian Socialist Workers' Party (MSZMP; Oct–Nov 1956)	—	I. Nagy II; MDP→MSZMP–FKGP
(44)		Imre Nagy (1896–1958); 2nd term	24 October 1956	4 November 1956 (deposed)	11 days	Hungarian Socialist Workers' Party (MDP; Oct 1956) Hungarian Socialist Workers' Party (MSZMP; Oct–Nov 1956)	—	I. Nagy III; MSZMP–FKGP–MSZDP–PP
46		János Kádár (1912–1989); 1st term	4 November 1956 (Note: In Uzhhorod exile, then in Szolnok to 7 November 1956.)	28 January 1958	1 year, 85 days	Hungarian Socialist Workers' Party (MSZMP)	—	Kádár I MSZMP
47		Ferenc Münnich (1886–1967)	28 January 1958	13 September 1961	3 years, 228 days	Hungarian Socialist Workers' Party (MSZMP)	1958	Münnich; MSZMP
(46)		János Kádár (1912–1989); 2nd term	13 September 1961	30 June 1965	3 years, 290 days	Hungarian Socialist Workers' Party (MSZMP)	—	Kádár II; MSZMP
(46)		János Kádár (1912–1989); 2nd term	13 September 1961	30 June 1965	3 years, 290 days	Hungarian Socialist Workers' Party (MSZMP)	1963	Kádár II; MSZMP
48		Gyula Kállai (1910–1996)	30 June 1965	14 April 1967	1 year, 288 days	Hungarian Socialist Workers' Party (MSZMP)	—	Kállai; MSZMP
49		Jenő Fock (1916–2001)	14 April 1967	15 May 1975	8 years, 31 days	Hungarian Socialist Workers' Party (MSZMP)	1967	Fock; MSZMP
49		Jenő Fock (1916–2001)	14 April 1967	15 May 1975	8 years, 31 days	Hungarian Socialist Workers' Party (MSZMP)	1971	Fock; MSZMP
50		György Lázár (1924–2014)	15 May 1975	25 June 1987	12 years, 41 days	Hungarian Socialist Workers' Party (MSZMP)	1975	Lázár; MSZMP
50		György Lázár (1924–2014)	15 May 1975	25 June 1987	12 years, 41 days	Hungarian Socialist Workers' Party (MSZMP)	1980	Lázár; MSZMP
50		György Lázár (1924–2014)	15 May 1975	25 June 1987	12 years, 41 days	Hungarian Socialist Workers' Party (MSZMP)	1985	Lázár; MSZMP
51		Károly Grósz (1930–1996)	25 June 1987	24 November 1988	1 year, 152 days	Hungarian Socialist Workers' Party (MSZMP)	—	Grósz; MSZMP
52		Miklós Németh (born 1948)	24 November 1988	23 October 1989	333 days	Hungarian Socialist Workers' Party (MSZMP)	—	Németh; MSZMP→MSZP

== Hungary (from 1989) ==
Parties MSZP MDF Fidesz TISZA Independent

No.	Portrait	Name (Birth–Death)	Term of office			Party	Election	Cabinet
No.	Portrait	Name (Birth–Death)	Took office	Left office	Tenure	Party	Election	Cabinet
Prime Minister of the Republic of Hungary / Prime Minister of Hungary
—		Miklós Németh (born 1948) acting	23 October 1989	23 May 1990	212 days	Hungarian Socialist Party (MSZP)	—	Németh; MSZP
53		József Antall (1932–1993)	23 May 1990	12 December 1993 (died in office)	3 years, 203 days	Hungarian Democratic Forum (MDF)	1990	Antall; MDF–FKGP (Note: FKGP split into two groups on 24 February 1992. EKGP (Group of 33 then 36 MPs) continued to support the government, while FKGP (Group of 12 then 10 MPs) went into opposition.)–KDNP
54		Péter Boross (born 1928)	12 December 1993	21 December 1993	9 days	Hungarian Democratic Forum (MDF)	—	Boross caretaker MDF–FKGP (Note: FKGP split into two groups on 24 February 1992. EKGP (Group of 33 then 36 MPs) continued to support the government, while FKGP (Group of 12 then 10 MPs) went into opposition.)–KDNP
54		Péter Boross (born 1928)	21 December 1993	15 July 1994	206 days	Hungarian Democratic Forum (MDF)	—	Boross; MDF–EKGP–KDNP
55		Gyula Horn (1932–2013)	15 July 1994	6 July 1998	3 years, 356 days	Hungarian Socialist Party (MSZP)	1994	Horn; MSZP–SZDSZ
56		Viktor Orbán (born 1963)	6 July 1998	27 May 2002	3 years, 325 days	Fidesz	1998	Orbán I Fidesz–FKGP–MDF
57		Péter Medgyessy (born 1942)	27 May 2002	29 September 2004	2 years, 125 days	Independent	2002	Medgyessy; MSZP–SZDSZ
58		Ferenc Gyurcsány (born 1961)	29 September 2004	14 April 2009	4 years, 197 days	Hungarian Socialist Party (MSZP)	—	Gyurcsány I MSZP–SZDSZ
58		Ferenc Gyurcsány (born 1961)	29 September 2004	14 April 2009	4 years, 197 days	Hungarian Socialist Party (MSZP)	2006	Gyurcsány II; MSZP–SZDSZ (Note: SZDSZ left the Gyurcsány II Cabinet on 20 April 2008.)
59		Gordon Bajnai (born 1968)	14 April 2009	29 May 2010	1 year, 45 days	Independent	—	Bajnai; MSZP (Note: The Bajnai Cabinet was supported externally by SZDSZ.)
(56)		Viktor Orbán (born 1963)	29 May 2010	9 May 2026	15 years, 345 days (Note: Total: 3 years, 325 days – first term; 15 years, 345 days – second term)	Fidesz	2010	Orbán II; Fidesz–KDNP
(56)		Viktor Orbán (born 1963)	29 May 2010	9 May 2026	15 years, 345 days	Fidesz	2014	Orbán III; Fidesz–KDNP
(56)		Viktor Orbán (born 1963)	29 May 2010	9 May 2026	15 years, 345 days	Fidesz	2018	Orbán IV; Fidesz–KDNP
(56)		Viktor Orbán (born 1963)	29 May 2010	9 May 2026	15 years, 345 days	Fidesz	2022	Orbán V Fidesz–KDNP
60		Péter Magyar (born 1981)	9 May 2026	Incumbent	191 days	Tisza Party (TISZA)	2026	Magyar; Tisza

== Timeline ==
This is a graphical lifespan timeline of the prime ministers of Hungary. They are listed in order of first assuming office.

The following chart lists prime ministers by lifespan (living prime ministers on the green line), with the years outside of their tenure in beige. Prime ministers with an unknown birth date or death date are shown with only their tenure or their earlier or later life.

The following chart shows prime ministers by their age (living prime ministers in green), with the years of their tenure in blue. Prime ministers with an unknown birth or death date are excluded. The vertical black line at 18 years indicates the minimum age to be prime minister through election in the National Assembly.

== See also ==
- List of Hungarian monarchs
- List of heads of state of Hungary
- List of palatines of Hungary
- List of prime ministers of Hungary by tenure
- List of prime ministers of Hungary (graphical)

== Sources ==
- Bölöny, József – Hubai, László: Magyarország kormányai 1848–2004 [Cabinets of Hungary 1848–2004], Akadémiai Kiadó, Budapest, 2004 (5th edition).
- Izsák, Alajos – Pölöskei, Ferenc – Romsics, Ignác – Urbán, Aladár: Magyar miniszterelnökök 1848–2002 [Prime ministers of Hungary 1848–2002], Kossuth Kiadó, Budapest, 2003.
- Markó, László: A magyar állam főméltóságai Szent Istvántól napjainkig – Életrajzi Lexikon [The High Officers of the Hungarian State from Saint Stephen to the Present Days – A Biographical Encyclopedia] (2nd edition); Helikon Kiadó Kft., 2006, Budapest; ISBN 963-547-085-1.
