= List of prime ministers of Hungary by tenure =

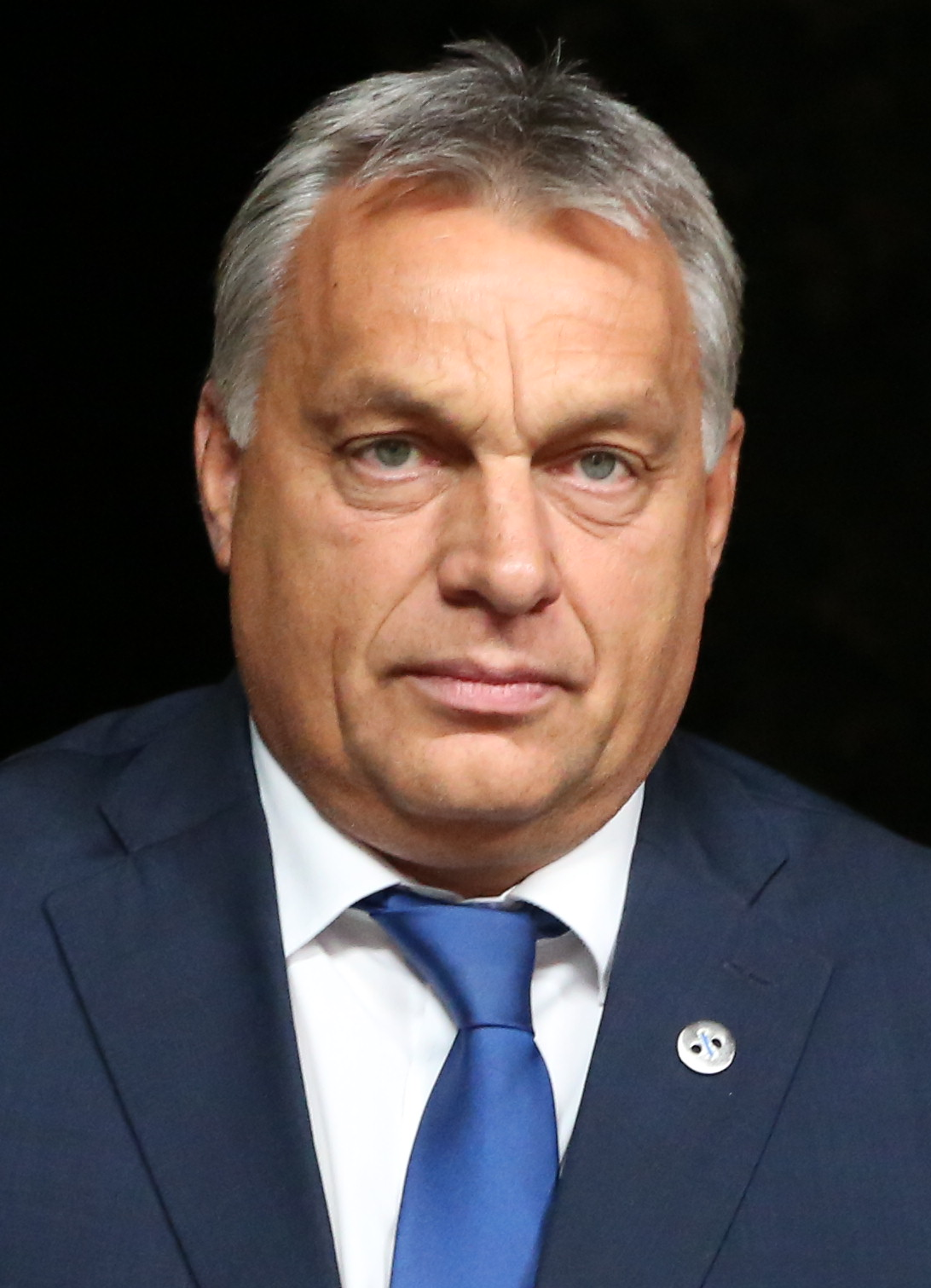
19 years, 305 days Viktor Orbán the longest-serving prime minister

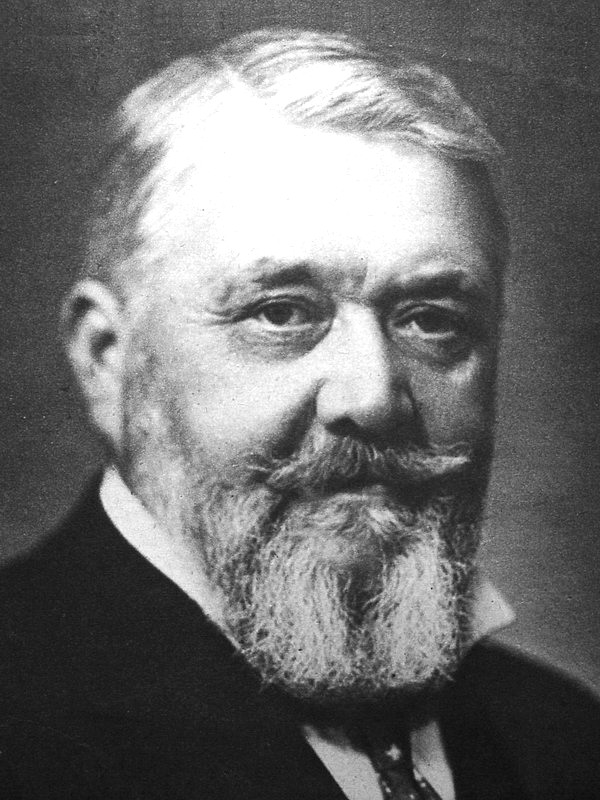
17 hours János Hadik shortest-serving prime minister

This list of prime ministers of Hungary lists each prime minister in order of term length. This is based on the difference between dates; if counted by number of calendar days all the figures would be one greater.

Viktor Orbán is the longest serving prime minister with his more than 19 years. János Hadik served as prime minister for less than one day in 1918.

Those prime ministers who served only in non official status are placed at the bottom row with an en-dash (–).

== Rank by time in office ==
Rank by length of terms	Prime Minister	Length by time served	Administrations	Party
1	Viktor Orbán	19 years, 305 days	2	Fidesz
2	Kálmán Tisza	14 years, 144 days	1	SZP
3	György Lázár	12 years, 41 days	1	MSZMP
4	István Bethlen	10 years, 132 days	1	KNEP/EP (Unity Party)
5	Jenő Fock	8 years, 31 days	1	MSZMP
6	Sándor Wekerle	7 years, 48 days	3	SZP/OAP/48AP
7	István Tisza	5 years, 232 days	2	SZP/NMP
8	János Kádár	5 years, 10 days	2	MSZMP
9	Gyula Andrássy	4 years, 270 days	1	DP
10	Ferenc Gyurcsány	4 years, 202 days	1	MSZP
11	Kálmán Széll	4 years, 121 days	1	SZP
12	Dezső Bánffy	4 years, 43 days	1	SZP
13	Gyula Gömbös	4 years, 5 days	1	NEP
14	Gyula Horn	3 years, 356 days	1	MSZP
15	István Dobi	3 years, 348 days	1	FKGP/Independent
16	Ferenc Münnich	3 years, 228 days	1	MSZMP
17	József Antall	3 years, 203 days	1	MDF
18	Pál Teleki	2 years, 316 days	2	KNEP/MÉP
19	Gyula Szapáry	2 years, 249 days	1	SZP
20	Károly Khuen-Héderváry	2 years, 225 days	2	SZP/NMP
21	Péter Medgyessy	2 years, 125 days	1	Independent
22	Miklós Kállay	2 years, 13 days	1	MÉP
23	Imre Nagy	1 year, 299 days	2	MDP/MSZMP
24	Gyula Kállai	1 year, 288 days	1	MSZMP
25	Kálmán Darányi	1 year, 220 days (Note: Also including the days serving as acting/counter/provisional prime minister)	1	NEP
26	Lajos Dinnyés	1 year, 193 days	1	FKGP
27	András Hegedüs	1 year, 189 days	1	MDP
28	Miklós Németh	1 year, 180 days	1	MSZMP/MSZP
29	Károly Grósz	1 year, 152 days	1	MSZMP
30	Ferenc Nagy	1 year, 116 days	1	FKGP
31	József Szlávy	1 year, 107 days	1	DP
32	László Lukács	1 year, 49 days	1	NMP
33	Gordon Bajnai	1 year, 45 days	1	Independent
34	Gyula Károlyi	1 year, 38 days	2	EP (Unity Party)/Independent
35	Menyhért Lónyay	1 year, 20 days	1	DP
36	István Bittó	346 days	1	DP
37	László Bárdossy	338 days	1	MÉP
38	Béla Miklós	328 days	1	Independent
39	Mátyás Rákosi	327 days	3	MDP
40	Géza Fejérváry	294 days	1	Independent
41	Béla Imrédy	278 days	1	NEP
42	Béla Wenckheim	232 days	1	SZP
43	Péter Boross	215 days	1	MDF
44	Lajos Kossuth	211 days	1	EP (Opposition Party)
45	Lajos Batthyány	199 days	1	EP (Opposition Party)
46	Péter Magyar	196 days (incumbent)	1	TISZA
47	Ferenc Szálasi	163 days	1	NYKP
48	Döme Sztójay	160 days	1	Independent
49	Sándor Garbai	133 days	1	KMP
50	Sándor Simonyi-Semadam	126 days	1	KNEP
51	Károly Huszár	112 days	1	KNEP
52	István Friedrich	109 days	1	KNP/KNEP/Independent
53	Bertalan Szemere	101 days	1	EP (Opposition Party)
54	Zoltán Tildy	78 days	1	FKGP
55	Mihály Károlyi	72 days	1	F48P
56	Dénes Berinkey	69 days	1	PRP (Civil Radical Party)
57	Móric Esterházy	66 days	1	Independent
58	Géza Lakatos	48 days	1	Independent
59	Gyula Peidl	5 days	1	MSZDP
60	János Hadik	17 hours	1	OAP
—	Dezső Pattantyús-Ábrahám	31 days	1	Independent
—	István Rakovszky	5 days	1	KNEP
—	Ádám Récsey	4 days	1	Military
—	Ferenc Keresztes-Fischer	2 days	2	MÉP

== See also ==
- List of Prime Ministers of Hungary
