= Christian Nationalist Party =

Christian Nationalist Party or Christian National Party may refer to various political parties advocating Christian nationalism:

- Christian Nationalist Party, English translation of Parti nationaliste chrétien, Quebec, Canada, 1960s
- Christian Nationalist Party, the political wing of the Christian Nationalist Crusade, U.S., 1940s–50s
- Christian Nationalist Party, a political party launched by former British National Party chairman Nick Griffin in 2025
- Philippine Christian Nationalist Party, a political party in the Philippines
- Christian National Party (Colombia), current
- Christian National Party (Hungary), 1920s
- Constitution Party (United States, 1952), or Christian Nationalist Party, a far-right-wing party that drafted Douglas MacArthur as presidential candidate

== See also ==
- Christian National Opposition Party, Hungary, 1920s
- Christian National Union Party, Hungary, 1920s
- Christian National Union, Poland, 1989–2010
- Christian National Union (Latvia), 1920s–1930s
- Christian-National Peasants' and Farmers' Party, Weimar Germany 1920s–1930s
- Christian Democratic National Peasants' Party, Romania, founded 1989
- National Christian Party, Romania, 1935–1938
- National Democratic Christian Party, Romania, 1990–2014
