= Zoltán Király =

Hungarian journalist, educator and politician

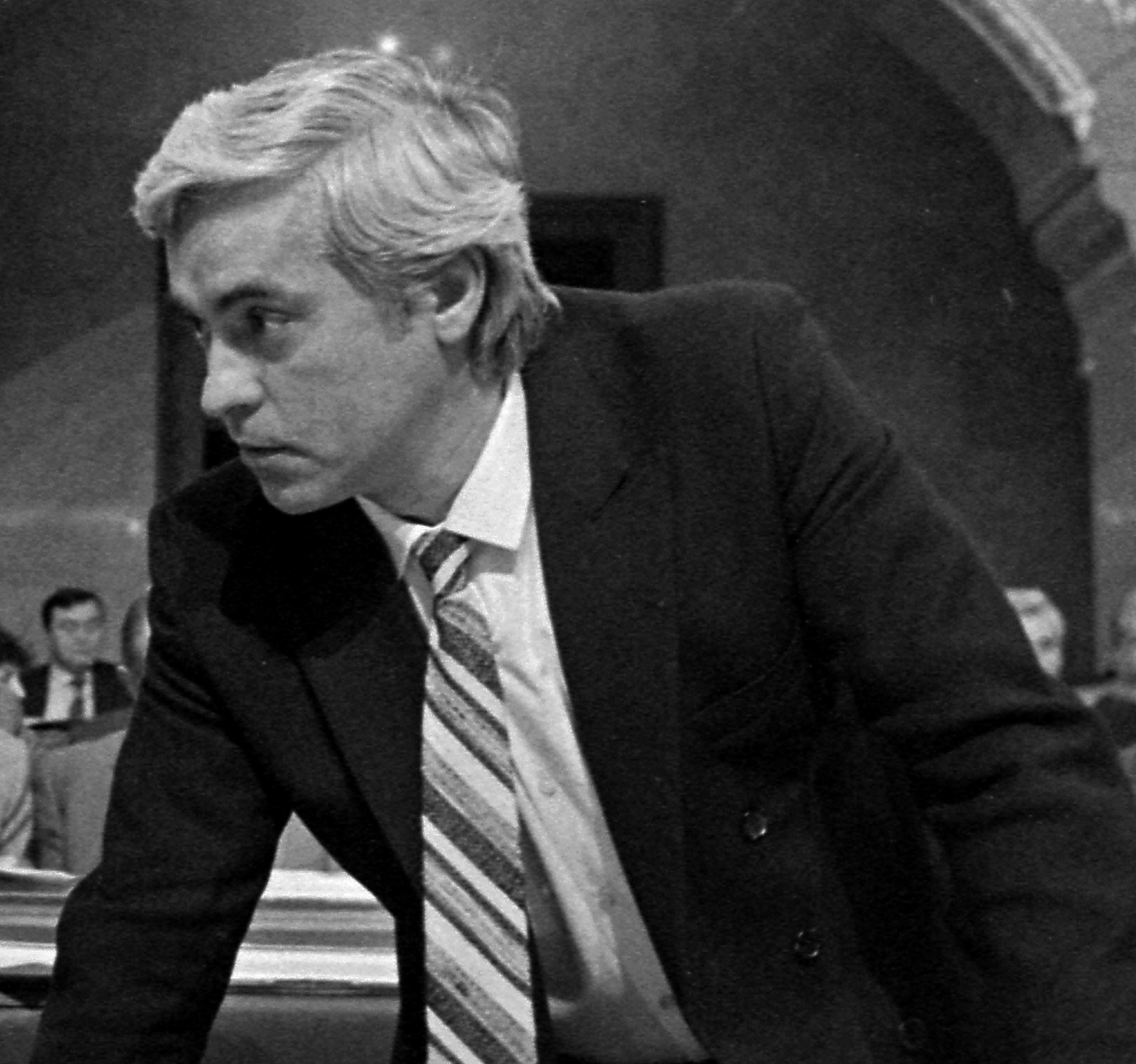

Member of the National Assembly
- In office 28 June 1985 – 27 June 1994

Personal details
- Born: 23 May 1948 (age 77) Kiskunfélegyháza, Hungary
- Party: MSZMP (1974–1988); MDF (1988–1990); MSZDP (1990–1997); MSZP (1997–2001)
- Profession: journalist, educator, politician

Zoltán Király (born 23 May 1948) is a Hungarian journalist, educator and politician, member of the National Assembly (MP) for Szeged (Csongrád County Constituency V then II) between 1985 and 1994.

== Biography ==
Király was born in Kiskunfélegyháza on 23 May 1948. He finished his primary and secondary studies in Kecskemét. He graduated from the Faculty of Law of the József Attila University in 1971. He studied pedagogy in the Juhász Gyula Teacher Training College (today part of the University of Szeged) between 1975 and 1979.

He served as a responsible for culture in the Bács-Kiskun County Committee of the Hungarian Young Communist League (KISZ) between 1971 and 1978. He edited the Petőfi Népe between 1973 and 1975 and the Szolnok studio of the Magyar Rádió from 1975 to 1978. He also worked for the Magyar Televízió. He was a member of the Hungarian Socialist Workers' Party (MSZMP) between 1974 and 1988. He became a member of the National Assembly in 1985 when he defeated as a spontaneous candidate the party secretary of Csongrád County. He joined the New March Front, an oppositional group, in 1988, as a result he was expelled from the state party along with his three colleagues.

During the first democratic parliamentary election in 1990, he was elected as MP for Szeged as a member of the Hungarian Democratic Forum (MDF). However he left the MDF parliamentary group four weeks later and became an Independent MP until the end of the parliamentary term. He joined the Hungarian Social Democratic Party (MSZDP) in 1990.

He served as managing director of the HT Press in 1991. He was a member of the Parliamentary Committee on Foreign Affairs in 1990 and from 1992 to 1994. He functioned as President of the MSZDP between 1993 and 1994. He was a member of the Hungarian Socialist Party (MSZP) from 1997 to 2001.

In 2014, Király ran as a Politics Can Be Different (LMP) candidate of local representative in Újbuda for the 2014 municipal election.

Party political offices
Preceded by Endre Borbély	President of the Hungarian Social Democratic Party; 1993–1994	Succeeded by László Kapolyi

== Sources ==
- István Elek: Rendszerváltoztatók húsz év után. Magyar Rádió Zrt. és Heti Válasz Lap- és Könyvkiadó Kft., 2009. pp. 170–177.
