= International Secretariat of Democratic Parties of Christian Inspiration =

Christian democratic political international (1925–1939)

- Abbreviation: SIPDIC
- Formation: 12 December 1925; 100 years ago
- Dissolved: 1939; 87 years ago
- Type: Political international

The International Secretariat of Democratic Parties of Christian Inspiration (French: Sécretariat International des Partis Démocratiques d'Inspiration Chrétienne, SIPDIC) or White International was a political international of Christian democratic parties in Interwar Europe.

== History ==
In 1921, Italian People's Party (PPI) tried to establish ties to the German Centre Party (DZP) and their Bavarian sister party the Bavarian People's Party (BVP) and the PPI reached out to various Catholic parties to create a "Popular International".

SIPDIC was established by representatives of the French Popular Democratic Party (PDP), the DZP and the PPI, among others, at a meeting in Paris in December 1925. Party representatives agreed to the organisation's structure and procedure at its second congress in Brussels in May 1926. It consisted of a central committee comprising one representative for each member party, aimed at fostering communication between them. The central committee organised annual conferences and sent circular letters on an irregular basis with information on national party developments. The committee was seated in Paris and was "effectively an appendix of the PDP secretariat", with the PDP covering its expenses. This structure was soon deemed too loose and informal, and a moderate reform was agreed upon at the congress in 's-Hertogenbosch in July 1928. The central committee was replaced by an executive committee which would meet twice a year, and member parties were all obliged to make small regular financial contributions to the secretariat. Additionally, the irregular circular letters were replaced by a regular internal bulletin.

In 1932, 18 delegations took part from Germany, Austria, Belgium, France, Hungary, Italy, Lithuania, Luxembourg, the Netherlands, Poland, Switzerland and Czechoslovakia. Upon the rise of Adolf Hitler and the dissolution of the Centre Party in 1933, SIPDIC lost "its main rationale, which was to foster European reconciliation – especially between France and Germany". While party representatives continued to meet annually, the organisation became increasingly irrelevant and was dissolved in 1939.

== Internal relations ==
SIPDIC was allowed for constructive internal debate and the formulation of common positions on themes such as the relation with socialist parties, the future of the League of Nations, family policy and the challenge of bolshevism and fascism. Despite SIPDIC's ideological cohesion, the geopolitical situation of interwar Europe formed a barrier to transnational cooperation. For example, party representatives repeatedly rejected PPI resolutions to condemn Fascist Italy, not wanting to harm diplomatic relations and other Catholic parties were willing to collaborate with the far-right and advocate for a synthesis of Catholicism and nationalism. Moreover, the PDP was held back in its cooperation with the Centre Party by fear for attacks from the nationalist right.

Additionally, sectionalism became characteristic for the Czechoslovak Christian Democracy at the time. In 1921, the Slovak People's Party (SĽS) broke away from Czechoslovak People's Party (ČSL) and the Hungarian Provincial Christian-Socialist Party adopted a negativist line in 1925, their activist wing had as the West Slovakian Christian Socialist Party no success. Even though the German Christian Social People's Party (DCVP) was activist, there was no real cooperation and each party focused on their own ethnic group and in the 1930s each party grew increasingly nationalist.

Under the Horthy era, Hungarian Christian parties often split because of individual personalities rather than political parties. Only in 1937, the Christian parties united under the United Christian Party (EKP) but the Catholic bloc declined and suffered splits to the opposition like the Christian National Socialist Front.

== Associated parties ==
State	Party	Note
Austria	Christian Social Party	Joined in 1931
Belgium	Catholic Party	Founding member
Czechoslovakia	Czechoslovak People's Party	Absent from the formation
Czechoslovakia	German Christian Social People's Party	Not a member but attended meetings.
Czechoslovakia	Slovak People's Party	Not a member but attended meetings.
France	Popular Democratic Party	Founding member
Germany	Centre Party	Founding member
Germany	Bavarian People's Party	Not a member but attended meetings.
Hungary	Christian Economic and Social Party	
Italy	Italian People's Party	Founding member
Lithuania	Lithuanian Christian Democratic Party	Absent from the formation
Luxembourg	Party of the Right	Initially an observer, joined in 1928
Netherlands	Roman Catholic State Party	Initially an observer, joined in 1928
Poland	Polish Christian Democratic Party	Founding member
Spain	Democratic Union of Catalonia	Joined in 1936
Switzerland	Swiss Conservative People's Party	
Yugoslavia	Slovene People's Party	Not a member but attended meetings.
