= László Varga =

László Varga may refer to:

- László Varga (footballer) (born 1987), Hungarian footballer
- László Varga (politician, 1979) (born 1979), Hungarian jurist and politician
- László Varga (politician, 1936) (born 1936), Hungarian Calvinist pastor and politician
- Laszlo Varga (cellist) (1924–2014), Hungarian-American cellist
- László Varga (weightlifter) (born 1953), Hungarian Olympic weightlifter
