= United Christian Party =

United Christian Party may refer to:

- United Christian Party (Australia)
- United Christian Party (Hungary)
- United Christian Party (United States), a small political party organized in 1897
