= National Radical Party (Hungary) =

Former political party in Hungary

The National Radical Party (Hungarian: Nemzeti Radikális Párt, NRP) was a political party in Hungary between 1930 and 1938.

== History ==
The NRP was founded by Endre Bajcsy-Zsilinszky in 1930 following the disbandment of the Hungarian National Independence Party (MNFP), most of whose members, including leader Gyula Gömbös, rejoined the Unity Party. Bajcsy-Zsilinszky's new party first In the 1931 elections the party won a single seat, taken by Bajcsy-Zsilinszky.

In the 1935 elections the party more than doubled its vote share, but failed to win a seat. In one multi-member constituency it ran a joint list with the National Independence Kossuth Party (OFKP). The joint list won one seat, taken by the OFKP. The NRP was dissolved in 1938 when Bajcsy-Zsilinszky joined the Independent Smallholders, Agrarian Workers and Civic Party (FKGP).
