= National Party of the Lower-Middle Class =

Hungarian political party

The National Party of the Lower-Middle Class (Hungarian: Kispolgárok Országos Pártja, KPOP) was a political party in Hungary during the 1920s.

== History ==
The party was established by Lajos Szilágyi in 1926, shortly before the parliamentary elections that year. It allied with the Unity Party and ran unopposed in the Berettyóújfalu constituency, with Szilágyi becoming the town's MP, serving until the 1931 elections, which the party did not contest.
