= Social Democratic Hungarian Civic Party =

Social Democratic Hungarian Civic Party Szociáldemokraták Magyar Polgári Pártja
- Leader: Andor Schmuck
- Founded: 26 May 2013
- Dissolved: 16 May 2015
- Split from: Hungarian Social Democratic Party
- Headquarters: Benczúr str. 41., 1068 Budapest
- Ideology: Social democracy
- Colours: Red

Website
- www.szocdemek.hu

Social Democratic Hungarian Civic Party (Hungarian: Szociáldemokraták Magyar Polgári Pártja, shortened form Soc Dems) was a Hungarian social-democratic political party, formed on 26 May 2013, and led by Andor Schmuck. This party claimed to be the legal successor to the Hungarian Social Democratic Party (MSZDP).

== History ==
The party was founded as the Hungarian Social Democrats' Party (Hungarian: Magyar Szociáldemokraták Pártja).
