= Christian Opposition =

Political party in Hungary

The Christian Opposition (Keresztény Ellenzék, KE) was a political party in Hungary during the inter-war period.

== History ==
The party first contested national elections in 1922, winning two seats in the parliamentary elections that year. Although it did not run in the 1926 elections, the party won two seats in the 1931 elections.

The 1935 elections saw the party reduced to a single seat. In 1937 they merged with the Christian Economic and Social Party and the National Legitimist Party to form the United Christian Party. However, former KE members broke away to re-establish their party later in the same year. In the 1939 elections the party lost its sole seat after receiving just 2,384 votes.
