= Ádám Récsey =

Hungarian politician

Baron Ádám Récsey de Récse
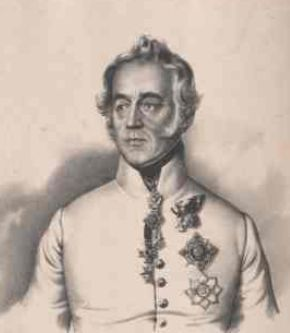

Prime Minister of Hungary appointed illegally
- In office 3 October 1848 – 7 October 1848; Not recognized
- Preceded by: Lajos Batthyány
- Succeeded by: Lajos Kossuth

Personal details
- Born: 10 February 1775 Sárd, Kingdom of Hungary, Habsburg Empire
- Died: 26 October 1852 (aged 77) Vienna, Austrian Empire
- Party: Independent
- Awards: Military Order of Maria Theresa
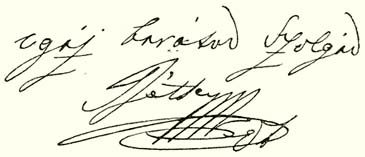
- Signature

Military service
- Allegiance: Austrian Empire
- Years of service: 1789–1850
- Rank: Feldzeugmeister
- Battles/wars: French Revolutionary Wars; Napoleonic Wars

Baron Ádám Récsey de Récse (Hungarian: récsei báró Récsey Ádám, German: Adam Retsey von Retse; 10 February 1775 – 26 October 1852) was a Hungarian general, joined the army of Habsburg monarchy, and briefly a politician who was appointed illegally as the Prime Minister of Hungary by King Ferdinand V during the Revolution of 1848, serving in this capacity from 3 October to 7 October 1848. Récsey countersigned his own appointment, neglecting the Diet of Hungary. He resigned when an uprising broke out in Vienna in the effects of the Hungarian Revolution. He was the only Hungarian Prime Minister who was born in the 18th century.

== Biography ==
=== Military career ===
Ádám Récsey de Récse was born into a Transylvanian noble family in Sárd (today Șard, part of Ighiu in Romania) on 10 February 1775 to József Récsey and Erzsébet Kapronczai. He entered the Imperial Army as a cadet in 1789, and participated in the French Revolutionary Wars and the Napoleonic Wars against France. Inter alia, he fought in the battles of Dresden, Kulm and Leipzig in 1813. For his service and loyalty, he was created baron by Emperor-King Francis I of Austria. By the end of the Napoleonic Wars, he was promoted to colonel within the Imperial Army and was also awarded the highest order for Habsburg imperial soldiers, the Military Order of Maria Theresia. He was appointed commander of a brigade in Italy in 1820, holding the rank major general. He was promoted to lieutenant general in 1831 and became a division commander in the Italian Peninsula. In 1839, he was ordered to transfer to Galicia, commanding Austrian forces there. Récsey was promoted to Feldzeugmeister in 1846 and was appointed vice-captain of the Hungarian Noble Guard.

=== Revolution of 1848 ===
During the Hungarian Revolution of 1848, Récsey remained a loyal supporter of the imperial court at Vienna. On 1 October 1848, Austrian Minister-President Johann von Wessenberg-Ampringen, negotiating with Hungarian Prime Minister Lajos Batthyány, tried unsuccessfully to reach the appointment of Récsey as Minister besides the King (i.e. Foreign Minister) in the Hungarian cabinet. Following the resignation of Batthyány, Ferdinand V appointed Récsey as Prime Minister in an unconstitutional manner on 3 October, neglecting Lajos Kossuth's Committee of National Defence (OHB), which took the role of government after the dissolution of the Batthyány cabinet. Some argue that Récsey reluctantly accepted the position in return of the forgiveness of his massive debt of 16 thousand forints towards the Austrian royal court. As "Prime Minister", Récsey countersigned his own appointment and Ferdinand's imperial rescript to dissolve the Hungarian Diet, to place Hungary under martial law and to appoint Josip Jelačić as Military and Civic Imperial Commissioner in Hungary.

On 5 October, Récsey, resided in Vienna, sent a document to the Hungarian Diet, in which he notified MPs to take the role of head of government and also sent Ferdinand's manifesto. However, the Vienna Uprising broke out on 6 October, when the crowd rebelled against the imperial family, and Ferdinand fled with his court to Olmütz (now Olomouc, Czech Republic) on 7 October. Récsey immediately resigned from his position on that day. The Hungarian Diet decided to launch a lawsuit against Récsey at the plenary session of 7–9 October. At the same time, regardless of the provision of the Hungarian parliament, Archduke Franz Karl of Austria dismissed Récsey from office of the Prime Minister in Hadersdorf, in accordance with Emperor-King Ferdinand's instruction. Récsey was captured by the insurgents in Vienna on 11 October. After the suppression of the uprising in early November 1848, Récsey was freed from captivity. He retired from the army in 1850. He died in Vienna on 26 October 1852, at the age of 77.
