= Pál Gábor Engelmann =

Pál Gábor Engelmann (1854 – 9 December 1916) was a figure of the Hungarian workers movement, and founder and leader of the Social Democratic Party of Hungary (MSZDP).

== Biography ==
Born in 1854, in Pest, Hungary to Jewish parents Izrael Engelmann and Rozália Hoffmann, he worked as a professional plumber. In 1884, he joined the General Workers' Party, later he led the revolutionary wing. In 1889 he was eventually head of the Workers' Party. At his instigation, the Social Democratic Party of Hungary was founded on 7 December 1890. In its efforts Engelmann was by Friedrich Engels supported, with whom he was in correspondence.

Under pressure from the opportunists, Engelmann was expelled in 1893 from the MSZDP. In January 1894, he therefore founded the Social Democratic Workers' Party of Hungary (MSZDMP), but in May 1894 reunited with the MSZDP. At the beginning of the 20th century Engelmann belonged to the left wing of the MSZDP.

He died on 9 December 1916.
