= Christian National Front =

Hungarian political party

The Christian National Front (Hungarian: Keresztény Nemzeti Front, KNF) was a catholic political party in Hungary during the 1930s.

== History ==
The party received 0.43% of the vote in the 1935 elections, winning one seat. They did not contest any further national elections.
