= National Agrarian Opposition =

Minor political party in Hungary

The National Agrarian Opposition (Hungarian: Nemzeti Agrár Ellenzék, NAE) was a minor political party in Hungary during the 1930s. Affiliated with the National Independence Kossuth Party, it ran only in Hódmezővásárhely.

== History ==
The party first contested national elections in 1931 as the Agro-Democratic Party, winning a single seat in the parliamentary elections that year. For the 1935 elections it ran as the "National Agrarian Opposition", again winning a single seat. Thereafter the party did not contest any further elections.
