= United Opposition (Hungary, 1930s) =

The United Opposition (Hungarian: Egyesült Ellenzék, EE) was a political party in Hungary during the 1930s.

== History ==
The party first contested national elections in 1931, winning a single seat in the parliamentary elections that year. It did not contest any further national elections.
