= Independent Socialist Party (Hungary) =

Political party in Hungary (1897–1898)

Independent Socialist Party Független Szocialísta Párt
- Leader: István Várkonyi
- Founded: 1897
- Dissolved: c. 1898
- Split from: Social Democratic Party of Hungary
- Ideology: Agrarian socialism

The Independent Socialist Party (Hungarian: Független Szocialísta Párt, pronounced [ˈfyɡːɛtlɛn ˈsot͡sijɒliʃtɒ ˈpaːrt]) was an agrarian socialist political party in Hungary. It was founded in 1897 by István Várkonyi, a rural labourer who left the Hungarian Social Democratic Party after disagreements over land redistribution and peasant revolts. The party advocated land reforms, including the forced sale and dividing of large estates. It took part in mobilising radical peasant struggles, resulting in the arrest of Várkonyi in 1898.

== History ==
István Várkonyi founded the Independent Socialist Party (FSP) in 1897, following his departure from the Hungarian Social Democratic Party (MSZDP). Várkonyi, a rural labourer, advocated the redistribution of land to the landless proletariat and poor peasantry, as well as the end of arbitrary detainments by the countryside gendarmerie (csendőrség). In contrast, the MSZDP supported the nationalisation of estates but not their redistribution to the peasantry. The MSZDP leadership was also cautious of and refused to participate in peasant uprisings, prompting Várkonyi to lead a number of other disillusion agrarian socialists to form the FSP. The party's demands to divide and redistribute estates exceeding 50 hectares earned it support among landless labourers and dwarf-holders.

Vilmos Mezőfi, Hungary's first socialist member of parliament, was reportedly elected thanks in part to the efforts of the FSP. He represented a poor rural constituency in eastern Hungary. The FSP supported a general strike by harvesters in 1897 and a peasant uprising in 1898 that saw the brief redistribution of land, particularly in the northeast of the Great Hungarian Plain. The authorities responded by arresting so-called "agitators", including Várkonyi. The Hungarian parliament also subsequently passed the so-called "slave law", which restricted the rights of rural labourers and imposed harsh punishments on strikers.
