= Andor Schmuck =

Hungarian politician (1970–2025)

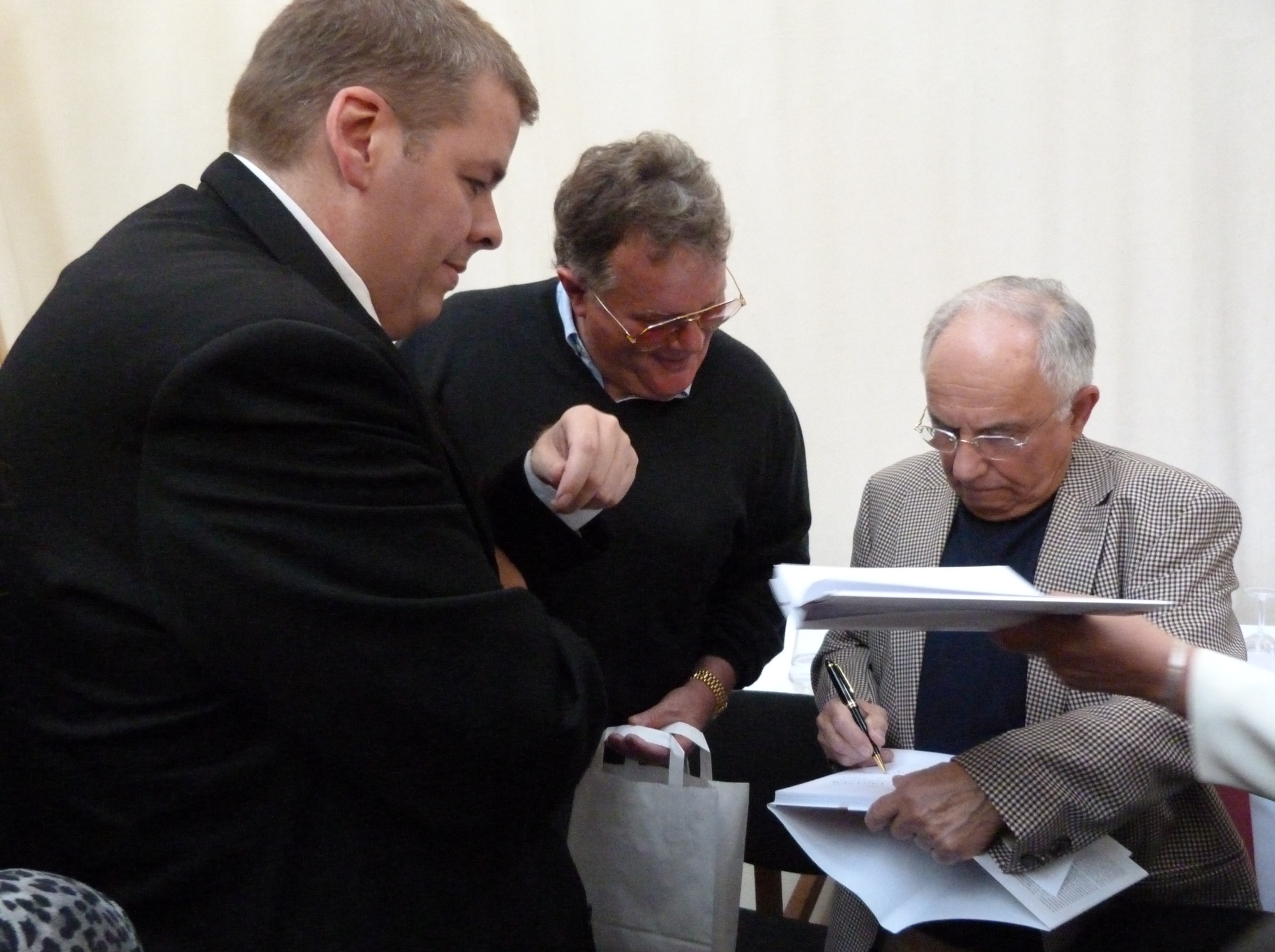
Schmuck (left) along with László Juszt and Tamás Vitray in 2012

Andor Ákos Schmuck (2 September 1970 – 14 July 2025) was a Hungarian politician who was both a member and the President of the Hungarian Social Democratic Party.

== Career ==
In September 2000, Schmuck took part in the founding of the European movement in Hungary. In 2004, his collaboration with the Society formed an organization, which they called "Respect". On 28 July 2012, for the Hungarian Social Democratic Party, he was elected president of the Executive. In 2024, he ran for elections in the 5th district in Budapest and lost to Szentgyörgyvölgyi Péter.

== Personal life and death ==
Schmuck married in 2009. In 2013, they got divorced.

Schmuck announced more than four months before his death that he was struggling with a serious illness (which he never publicly identified), for which he underwent treatment. He died on 14 July 2025, at the age of 54.

Party political offices
Preceded by László Kapolyi	President of the Hungarian Social Democratic Party; 2012–2013	Succeeded by László Kapolyi
