= Christian Democratic People's Party (Hungary) =

Political party in Hungary

Christian Democratic People's Party Kereszténydemokrata Néppárt
- Abbreviation: KDNP
- President: Zsolt Semjén
- Vice presidents: Tristan Azbej; Hajnalka Juhász; Bence Rétvári; Miklós Seszták; György Hölvényi; Miklós Soltész
- Founded: 13 October 1944; 82 years ago
- Legalised: 1989; 37 years ago
- Preceded by: United Christian Party
- Headquarters: 1141 Budapest, Bazsarózsa utca 69.
- Youth wing: Young Christian Democratic Alliance
- Women's wing: Christian Democratic People's Party Women's Wing
- Ideology: Christian right; Christian nationalism
- Political position: Right-wing to far-right
- Religion: Catholicism
- National affiliation: Fidesz–KDNP (since 2005)
- European affiliation: None (since 2024) (Note: The party was formerly part of the European People's Party (2009–2024).)
- European Parliament group: Patriots for Europe (since 2024) (Note: The party was formerly part of the European People's Party Group (2009–2024).)
- International affiliation: Centrist Democrat International
- Colors: Green Gold
- Slogan: Több fényt! ('More Light!')
- National Assembly: 8 / 199
- European Parliament: 1 / 21

Website
- kdnp.hu

The Christian Democratic People's Party (Kereszténydemokrata Néppárt [ˈkɛrɛsteːɲdɛmokrɒtɒ ˈneːpːaːrt]), commonly known by its abbreviation KDNP (Hungarian: [ˈkaːdeːɛmpeː]) is a far-right Christian nationalist political party in Hungary. The party closely adheres to the beliefs and doctrines of the Catholic Church, which has a close relationship with the party and received significant amounts of money under the Fidesz–KDNP government.

While it is officially considered be the junior partner in an electoral alliance with the former ruling party, Fidesz, it is practically considered to be a satellite party of Fidesz. The party has been unable to get into Parliament on its own since the 1990s (with the last time it did so being 1994), as it has fallen short of the election threshold of 5% of the vote. Without Fidesz, its support is now low enough that it can no longer be measured, and leading Fidesz politician János Lázár stated that Fidesz does not consider the government to be a coalition government.

== History ==
Logo of the Democratic Peoples' Party, 1944–1949

The party was founded under the name of KDNP on 13 October 1944 by Hungarian Catholic statesmen, intellectuals and clergy, and was a successor to the pre-war United Christian Party. Among the founders were Bishop Vilmos Apor, Béla Kovrig (president of the University of Cluj-Napoca), László Varga, Count József Pálffy, ethnographer Sándor Bálint and political journalist István Barankovics. It was an offshoot of the Catholic Social Folk Movement (KSzN), a civil organization. At the beginning of 1945 they elected Barankovics as principal secretary.

The new KDNP enjoyed just four or five months of semi-legality towards the end of World War II. At the end of the war, the communist-dominated post-war authorities refused to legalize it or permit it to operate further. Despite attempts by Varga and Barankovics, they were refused official permission to operate and take part in elections. Some of the party's founders, including Varga, were imprisoned for some days by detachments of the Arrow Cross Party.

Meanwhile, some party members were saying that Barankovics conceded too much to the communist-influenced authorities in return for too little, and there was growing friction between two factions: the Christian socialist left wing led by Barankovics and the conservative-clerical right wing led by József Mindszenty's confidant, József Pálffy. The left wing gained increasing ascendancy in the party, and on 8 May 1945, Barankovics replaced Pálffy as president. The party changed its name to the Democratic People's Party (DNP), while a group led by Pálffy founded a new party called KDNP, which, however, failed to remain legal in an atmosphere of increasing Soviet influence. The 1947 elections saw the DNP finish second in the popular vote, winning 60 of the 411 seats.

DNP was a democratic and anticommunist organisation. In 1949, Mátyás Rákosi asked Barankovics for the party's leaders to help him in the show trial against Cardinal Mindszenty, who was already ill in prison. Barankovics refused and, abandoning his party, escaped to Austria in an American diplomat's car. Many people followed his example; others were imprisoned by communists. The party was subsequently dissolved in January 1949.

=== Refoundation and present ===
The party was refounded in 1989 with its present name. The link between the historical party and the present one is disputed, although prominent members of the original party, like László Varga, took part in its refoundation. The party won 21 seats in the 1990 parliamentary election and entered the government with the Hungarian Democratic Forum (MDF) and the Independent Smallholders, Agrarian Workers and Civic Party (FKgP) and, later, the United Smallholders' Party (EKGP).

In the 1994 election, KDNP won 22 seats in the National Assembly and moved into opposition to the new coalition between the Hungarian Socialist Party (MSZP) and the Alliance of Free Democrats (SZDSZ). It lost all of its seats in the 1998 election.

In 2002 it formed a joint list with the Centre Party but again it did not manage to win any seats.

In 2005 KDNP signed an agreement with Fidesz for election cooperation, a result of which the KDNP obtained seats in the National Assembly. In the 2006 elections this alliance gained strength, winning 42.0% of the list votes and 164 representatives out of 386 in the National Assembly. The party decided to form a self-contained parliamentary faction with 23 representatives.

The Fidesz-KDNP Alliance won the 2010 election, with the KDNP increasing its seats to 36; party leader Zsolt Semjén was appointed Deputy Prime Minister and Minister for National Politics. The alliance won again in the 2014 and 2018 election, although KDNP decreased its seats to 16. The party currently holds two ministers in the Fourth Orbán Government: party leader Zsolt Semjén (Deputy Prime Minister and Minister for National Politics, Church Affairs and Nationalities) and János Süli (Minister for the planning, construction and commissioning of the two new blocks at Paks Nuclear Power Plant).

The party is considered by many to have become a satellite party of Fidesz. Without Fidesz, its support cannot be measured, and even a leading Fidesz politician, János Lázár stated in 2011 that Fidesz does not consider the government to be a coalition government.

KDNP was a member of the European People's Party (EPP) until 2024. Although its ally Fidesz's membership has been suspended on 20 March 2019, and its MEPs left the European People's Party group on 3 March 2021, KDNP retained its European affiliation and their only MEP György Hölvényi remained the sole member of the EPP group from Hungary thereafter. In response to the admission of Tisza Party to EPP following the 2024 European Parliament election, the KDNP decided to leave EPP and its parliamentary group on 18 June 2024, denouncing a betrayal of Christian Democratic values by the EPP; it subsequently joined Patriots for Europe alongside Fidesz.

== Ideology ==
KDNP is a right-wing, conservative Christian nationalist party. It is well known in Hungary for its traditional-marriage, anti-abortion and anti-immigration stance, and its representatives voted against the Treaty establishing a Constitution for Europe because it did not refer to Europe's Christian heritage, although the party does not consider itself Eurosceptic. The party emphasises traditional values on issues like abortion, family law, education and the role of the church more than Fidesz, which takes a more secular position.

KDNP has supported the severe restriction on Sunday shopping ("free Sunday", as they called) for a long time, citing Christian values. Parliament voted on the issue on December 14, 2014 and the law came into effect on March 15, 2015 (a Sunday on which shops would have been closed anyway, the day being a public holiday in Hungary). Public opinion was predominantly against the decision. Three polls done in the spring of 2015 registered an opposition of 64% (Szonda Ipsos), 62% (Medián) 59% (Tárki). By the end of May, according to a poll by Medián, 72% of those polled disliked the new law, even the majority of Fidesz-KDNP voters were against it. Opposition parties and private persons tried to start a public referendum several times. By November 2015 there were 16 such attempts, but none of them were approved, for various bureaucratic reasons, until in early 2016 one of these attempts, initiated by the Hungarian Socialist Party, was finally successful. The government, rather than being forced to hold the referendum (which could have been interpreted as a huge success for the opposition party, even though the law was opposed by the majority of Fidesz voters too) lifted the ban in April 2016.

== Election results ==
=== National Assembly ===
Election	Leader	National vote				Seats	+/–	Status
Election	Leader	Votes		%		Seats	+/–	Status
1945 (Note: Run in a joint list with FKgP.)	István Barankovics	2,697,137		57.03 (#1)		2 / 409	New	Coalition (FKgP-MKP-MSZDP-NPP-KNDP)
1947	István Barankovics	824,259		16.50 (#2)		60 / 411	▲58	Opposition
Election	Leader	SMCs		MMCs		Seats	+/–	Status
Election	Leader	Votes	%	Votes	%	Seats	+/–	Status
1990	Sándor Keresztes	287,614	5.80 (#5)	317,183	6.46 (#6)	21 / 386	New	Coalition (MDF-FKgP-KNDP) (1990–1993) (MDF-EKGP-KNDP) (1993–1994)
1994	László Surján	397,887	7.37 (#6)	379,573	7.03 (#5)	22 / 386	▲1	Opposition
1998	György Giczy	129,791	2.90 (#8)	116,068	2.58 (#8)	0 / 386	▼22	Extra-parliamentary
2002 (Note: Run as part of the Centre Party-KDNP coalition.)	László Varga	182,256	3.24 (#4)	219,029	3.90 (#4)	0 / 386	0	Extra-parliamentary
2006 (Note: Run as part of the Fidesz–KDNP coalition.)	Zsolt Semjén	2,269,241	41.99 (#1)	2,272,979	43.21 (#2)	23 / 386	▲23	Opposition
2010	Zsolt Semjén	2,732,965	53.43 (#1)	2,706,292	52.73 (#1)	36 / 386	▲13	Supermajority (Fidesz-KDNP)
Election	Leader	Constituency		Party list		Seats	+/–	Status
Election	Leader	Votes	%	Votes	%	Seats	+/–	Status
2014	Zsolt Semjén	2,165,342	44.11 (#1)	2,264,780	44.87 (#1)	16 / 199	▼20	Supermajority (Fidesz-KDNP)
2018	Zsolt Semjén	2,636,201	47.89 (#1)	2,8224,551	49.27 (#1)	16 / 199	0	Supermajority (Fidesz-KDNP)
2022	Zsolt Semjén	2,823,419	52.52 (#1)	3,060,706	54.13 (#1)	18 / 199	▲2	Supermajority (Fidesz-KDNP)
2026	Zsolt Semjén	2,215,225	36.72 (#2)	2,458,337	38.61 (#2)	8 / 199	▼10	Opposition

=== European Parliament ===
Election	List leader	Votes	%	Seats	+/−	EP Group
2009 (Note: Run as part of the Fidesz–KDNP coalition.)	Pál Schmitt	1,632,309	56.36 (#1)	1 / 22	New	EPP
2014	Ildikó Pelczné Gáll	1,193,991	51.48 (#1)	1 / 21	0	EPP
2019	László Trócsányi	1,824,220	52.56 (#1)	1 / 21	0	EPP
2024	Tamás Deutsch	2,048,211	44.82 (#1)	1 / 21	0	PfE

== See also ==
- Politics of Hungary
