= Agrarian Party (Hungary) =

Political party in Hungary

The Agrarian Party (Hungarian: Agrárpárt, AP) was a political party in Hungary in the inter-war period.

== History ==
The party was first ran in national elections in 1926, when it won three seats in the parliamentary elections that year. It did not contest any further national elections.
