= Hungarian Agricultural Labourers and Workers Party =

Political party in Hungary

The Hungarian Agricultural Labourers and Workers Party (Hungarian: Magyarországi Földmíves és Munkáspárt, MFMP) was a political party in Hungary during the inter-war period.

== History ==
The party first contested national elections in 1926, failing to win a seat in the parliamentary elections that year. It also failed to win a seat in the 1931 elections, but succeeded in winning a single seat in the 1935 elections. It did not contest any further national elections.
