= National Legitimist Party =

National Legitimist Party Nemzeti Legitimista Néppárt
- Leader: Miklós Griger
- Founded: 27 June 1933
- Dissolved: 26 January 1937
- Merged into: United Christian Party
- Ideology: Royalism
- Political position: Right-wing
- Religion: Catholicism

The National Legitimist (People's) Party (Nemzeti Legitimista Néppárt, NLN) was a political party in Hungary during the 1930s.

== History ==
The party first contested national elections in 1935, winning a single seat in the parliamentary elections that year. In 1937 they merged with the Christian Economic and Social Party and the Christian Opposition to form the United Christian Party.
