= Independent Civic Party =

The Independent Civic Party (Hungarian: Független Polgári Párt, FPP) was a political party in Hungary during the 1930s.

== History ==
The party first contested national elections in 1931, winning a single seat in the parliamentary elections that year. It did not contest any further elections.
