= Reform Generation =

Hungarian political party

The Reform Generation (Hungarian: Reformnemzedék) was a political party in Hungary during the 1930s.

== History ==
The party won two seats in the 1935 elections, It did not contest any further elections.
