= Independent Left Party =

Hungarian political party

The Independent Left Party (Hungarian: Független Balpárt, FBP) was a political party in Hungary during the 1930s.

== History ==
The party first contested national elections in 1931, winning a single seat in the parliamentary elections that year. It did not contest any further national elections.
