= Christian National Economic Party =

Political party in Hungary

The Christian National Economic Party was a political party in Hungary during the 1920s.

== History ==
The party was established in 1925 as the Christian Economic Party by János Zichy, with most members being former civil servants. It was later renamed as the Christian National Economic Party, but was widely known as the Zichy Party. The party won 35 seats in the 1926 elections, becoming the second largest party behind the ruling Unity Party.

Around 1930 it merged with the Christian National Union Party and the minor Christian Social Party to form the Christian Economic and Social Party.

== Ideology ==
The party supported a return to Habsburg rule.
