= 1935 Hungarian parliamentary election =

- 31 March – 7 April 1935

All 245 elected seats in the Diet 123 seats needed for a majority
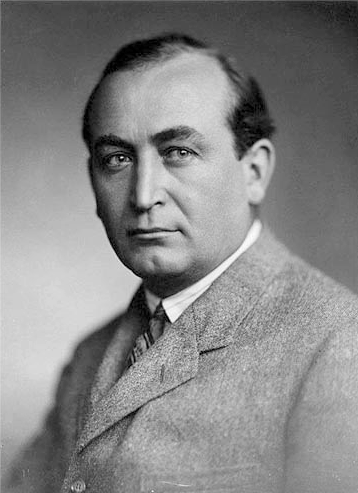

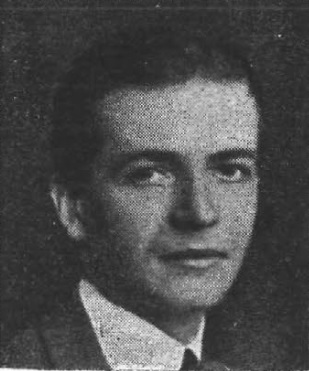

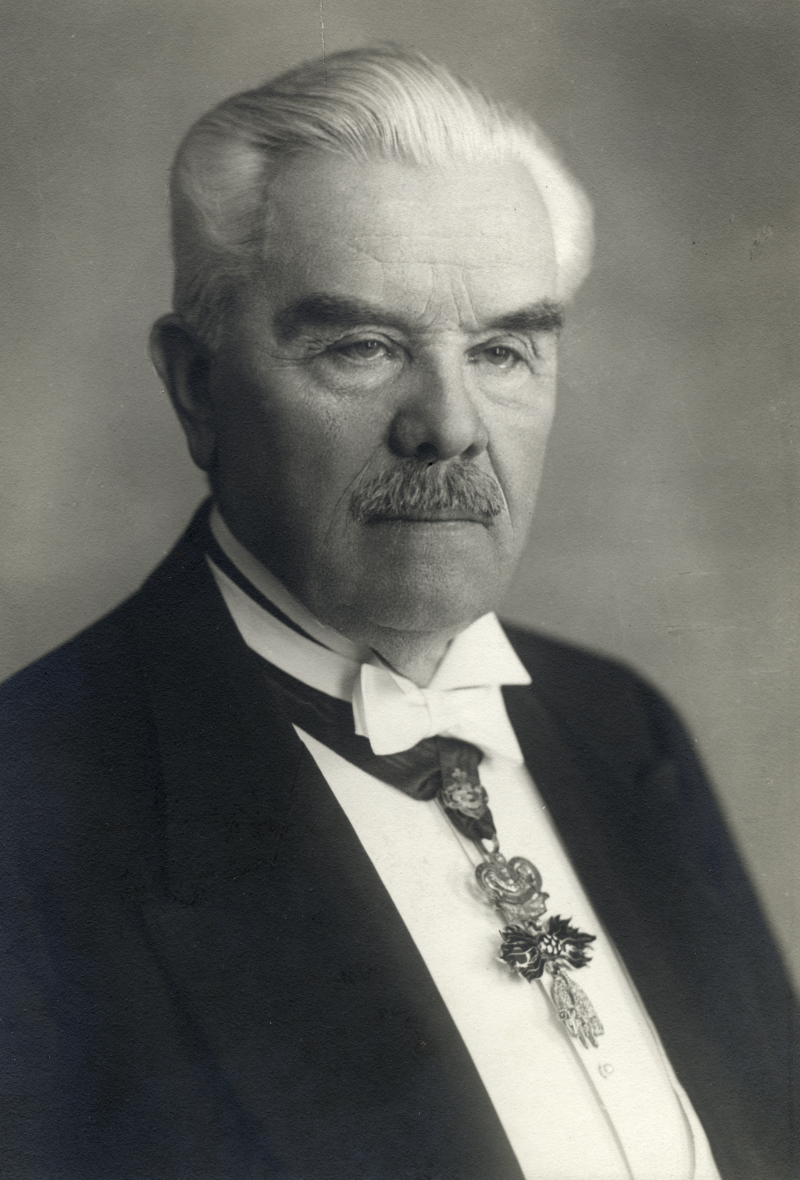

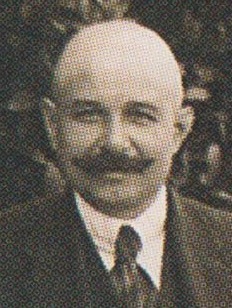
	First party	Second party
Leader	Gyula Gömbös	Tibor Eckhardt
Party	NEP	FKgP
Seats won	164 / 245	22 / 245
Popular vote	879,474	387,351
Percentage	44.55%	19.62%
	Third party	Fourth party
Leader	János Zichy	Károly Peyer
Party	KGSZP	MSZDP
Seats won	14 / 245	11 / 245
Popular vote	175,165	132,052
Percentage	8.87%	6.69%
Prime Minister before election
Gyula Gömbös
NEP
Prime Minister after election
Gyula Gömbös
NEP

Parliamentary elections were held in Hungary between 31 March and 7 April 1935. The result was a victory for the Party of National Unity, which won 164 of the 245 seats in Parliament. Gyula Gömbös remained Prime Minister.

== Electoral system ==
The electoral system remained the same as in 1931. There were 199 openly elected single-member constituencies and 11 secretly elected multi-member constituencies electing a total of 46 seats.

== Parties and leaders ==
Party	Leader
National Unity Party (NEP)	Gyula Gömbös
Independent Smallholders, Agrarian Workers and Civic Party (FKgP)	Tibor Eckhardt
Christian Economic and Social Party (KGSZP)	János Zichy
Social Democratic Party of Hungary (MSZDP)	Károly Peyer
Hungarian National Socialist Party (MNSZP)	Sándor Festetics
Civic Freedom Party (PSZP)	Károly Rassay

== Results ==
Party	Votes	%	Seats	+/–
Party of National Unity	879,474	44.55	164	+15
Independent Smallholders Party	387,351	19.62	22	+12
Christian Economic and Social Party	175,165	8.87	14	–18
Social Democratic Party of Hungary	132,052	6.69	11	–3
Hungarian National Socialist Party	75,318	3.82	2	New
Liberal and Democratic Opposition (ESZDP–NDP)	72,407	3.67	7	+1
Unofficial Party of National Unity candidates	56,249	2.85	6	–2
National Legitimist Party	40,025	2.03	1	New
National Radical Party (Note: The National Radical Party and the National Independence Kossuth Party ran a joint list in one multi-member constituency. It won a single seat, taken by the National Independence Kossuth Party.)	17,031	0.86	0	–1
Reform Generation	14,478	0.73	2	New
Hungarian Agricultural Labourers and Workers Party	11,004	0.56	1	+1
Christian Opposition	9,151	0.46	1	–1
Christian National Front	8,526	0.43	1	New
Party of National Will	7,431	0.38	1	New
Party of Independence and '48	5,648	0.29	1	+1
National Agrarian Opposition	5,320	0.27	1	0
Free Civic Party	2,527	0.13	0	New
Unified National Party of Workers and Lower Middle Class	915	0.05	0	New
Hungarian Truth Party	546	0.03	0	New
Independents	73,471	3.72	10	–6
Total	1,974,089	100.00	245	0
Registered voters/turnout	2,475,214	–		
Source: Nohlen & Stöver

The total number of registered voters was 3,005,742, but only 2,475,214 were in contested constituencies.

=== By constituency type ===
Party	SMCs (Note: The number of votes refers to only 146 of the 199 single-member constituencies, as 53 seats were uncontested.)			MMCs (Note: The number of votes refers to ten of the eleven MMCs.)			Total seats
Party	Votes	%	Seats	Votes	%	Seats	Total seats
Party of National Unity	718,911	49.27	150	160,563	31.18	14	164
Independent Smallholders Party	379,696	26.02	21	7,655	1.49	1	22
Christian Economic and Social Party	91,827	6.29	7	83,338	16.18	7	14
Social Democratic Party of Hungary				132,052	25.64	11	11
Hungarian National Socialist Party	57,544	3.94	1	17,774	3.45	1	2
Liberal and Democratic Opposition (ESZDP–NDP)				72,407	14.06	7	7
Unofficial Party of National Unity candidates	53,018	3.63	6	3,231	0.63	0	6
National Legitimist Party	36,502	2.50	1	3,523	0.68	0	1
National Radical Party	9,309	0.64	0	7,722	1.50	0	0
Reform Generation	9,265	0.63	1	5,213	1.01	1	2
Hungarian Agricultural Labourers and Workers Party	11,004	0.75	1				1
Christian Opposition	4,928	0.34	0	4,223	0.82	1	1
Christian National Front				8,526	1.66	1	1
Party of National Will	7,431	0.51	1				1
Party of Independence and '48	5,648	0.39	0			1	1
National Agrarian Opposition				5,320	1.03	1	1
Free Civic Party				2,527	0.49	0	0
Unified National Party of Workers and Lower Middle Class				915	0.18	0	0
Hungarian Truth Party	546	0.04	0				0
Independents	73,471	5.04	10				10
Total	1,459,100	100.00	199	514,989	100.00	46	245
Valid votes	1,459,100	100.00					
Invalid/blank votes	0	0.00					
Total votes	1,459,100	100.00					
Registered voters/turnout	1,820,266	80.16		654,948	–		
Source: Nohlen & Stöver
