= Hungarian National Independence Party =

Hungarian National Independence Party Magyar Nemzeti Függetlenségi Párt
- Leader: Gyula Gömbös
- Founded: 1923
- Dissolved: 1928
- Split from: Unity Party
- Merged into: Unity Party
- Headquarters: Budapest
- Ideology: Szeged Idea; Hungarian nationalism
- Political position: Far-right

The Hungarian National Independence Party (Hungarian: Magyar Nemzeti Függetlenségi Párt, MNFP), also known as the Party of Racial Defence, was a political party in Hungary in the interwar period.

== History ==
The party was established in 1923 by a right-wing breakaway from the Unity Party led by Gyula Gömbös, and initially had seven seats in Parliament. However, promoting a racist agenda, it won only two seats in the 1926 elections.

The party was disbanded in September 1928, with its members rejoined the Unity Party.
