= László Varga (politician, 1936) =

Hungarian politician (born 1936)

Member of the National Assembly
- In office 14 May 2010 – 5 May 2014

Personal details
- Born: 19 April 1936 (age 89) Kecskemét, Hungary
- Party: KDNP
- Profession: Calvinist pastor, politician

László Varga (born 19 April 1936) is a Hungarian Calvinist pastor and politician, member of the National Assembly (MP) from Fidesz–KDNP Bács-Kiskun County Regional List between 2010 and 2014.
