= Christian National Party (Hungary) =

Christian National Party Keresztény Nemzeti Párt
- Leader: István Friedrich
- Chairman: Pál Teleki
- Founded: 30 August 1919
- Dissolved: 16 January 1922
- Merged into: KNEP (majority)
- Succeeded by: Andrássy-Friedrich Party
- Newspaper: Nemzeti Újság
- Ideology: National conservatism Christian conservativism Legitimism
- Political position: Right-wing

The Christian National Party (Hungarian: Keresztény Nemzeti Párt, KNP) was a short-lived political party in Hungary during the early 1920s.

== History ==
Following their successful coup against the Social Democrat-composed cabinet of Gyula Peidl, the counter-revolutionary White House Comrades Association had established the Christian National Party. Count Pál Teleki, who returned from exile, was elected its chairman, but the actual leader was István Friedrich, a key figure of the coup, who became Prime Minister on 7 August 1919. The party received support from conservative and Roman Catholic bourgeoisie and monarchist elements, mostly civil servants, industrialists and intellectuals. The KNP published its programme ("Christian Hungarian Brothers") with the permission of censorship by the Romanian authorities who occupied Budapest after the fall of the Hungarian Soviet Republic. The document contained some anti-Semitic and anti-democratic points. The party also demanded universal suffrage and the "recovery of Hungarian economic and cultural hegemony". Beside Friedrich, prominent members of the party were András Csilléry, Ferenc Schnetzer, Károly Ereky, Jakab Bleyer, Gyula Pekár, all were ministers in the Friedrich cabinet.

As the Catholic Church in Hungary urged the merger of Christian parties on a permanent basis, majority of KNP merged with the majority of the Christian Social and Economic Party (KSZGP) to form the Christian National Union Party (KNEP) on 25 October 1919. Friedrich was elected leader of the new party. The remaining party contested national elections in 1920, winning two seats in the parliamentary elections that year. Due to the presence of a number of strong personalities, however, KNEP quickly began to fragment. On 12 April 1920, Friedrich and his other six MPs left the party and re-joined KNP. He was elected chairman of the party after that. Basically, the KNP remained a parliamentary group with the lack of mass support. In the October 1921 by-election, their only candidate received 0.56 percent of the vote. After the Hungarian parliament declared the dethronement of the House of Habsburg-Lorraine, Gyula Andrássy the Younger and ten other aristocrats left the KNEP to join KNP on 14 January 1922. Two days later the party was renamed to Christian National Agricultural Workers' and Civic Party (KNFPP), more commonly known as the Andrássy-Friedrich Party.

In the 1922 elections, the remaining part of the party lost both seats, receiving just 0.2% of the national vote.

== Election results ==
=== National Assembly ===
Election	Votes	%	Seats	+/–	Government
1920	6,361	0.5%	2 / 219	New	In opposition
1922	3,547	0.2%	0 / 245	▼2	Extra-parliamentary
