= United Christian Party (Hungary) =

United Christian Party Egyesült Kereszténypárt
- Founded: 1937
- Dissolved: 1944
- Merger of: KGSZP, KE, NLN
- Succeeded by: KDNP
- Religion: Catholicism

The United Christian Party (Egyesült Kereszténypárt, EKP) was a political party in Hungary that operated from the late 1930s until dissolving in 1944.

== History ==
The party was formed in 1937 by a merger of the Christian Economic and Social Party (KGSZP), the Christian Opposition and the National Legitimist Party (NLN), although members of the Christian Opposition broke away later in the same year to re-establish their party. Some other members left to establish the far-right Christian National Socialist Front (KNSZF).

The 1939 elections saw the new party win only four seats, eleven fewer than the KGSZP and NLN had won in 1935. It finished behind the Christian National Socialist Front in terms of vote share, although the KNSZF won only three seats. Neither party contested another election.

After World War II, the EKP was succeeded by the Christian Democratic People's Party.
