= Christian Economic and Social Party =

Christian Economic and Social Party Keresztény Gazdasági és Szociális Párt
- Leader: János Zichy
- Founded: c. 1930
- Dissolved: January 1937
- Merger of: Christian National Economic Party, Christian National Union Party, Andrássy-Friedrich Party
- Merged into: United Christian Party
- European affiliation: White International

The Christian Economic and Social Party (Keresztény Gazdasági és Szociális Párt, KGSZP) was a political party in Hungary in the inter-war period.

== History ==
The party was established around 1930 by a merger of the Christian National Economic Party (known as the Zichy Party), the Christian National Union Party (also known as the Wolff Party) and the small Christian Social Party. As a result, it was often known as the Wolff and Zichy Party. The 1932 elections saw the party win 32 seats, becoming the second-largest faction.

In the 1935 elections the party won only 14 seats, and was reduced to being the third party in Parliament. In January 1937 they merged with the Christian Opposition and the National Legitimist Party to form the United Christian Party.
