= List of prime ministers of Hungary (graphical) =

This is a graphical list of prime ministers of Hungary from when the first Prime Minister (in the modern sense), Lajos Batthyány, took office in 1848, until the present day.
