= Christian National Opposition Party =

Political party in Hungary

The Christian National Opposition Party (Hungarian: Keresztény Nemzeti Ellenzéki Párt, KNEP) was a political party in Hungary during the 1930s.

== History ==
The party first contested national elections in 1931, winning a single seat in the parliamentary elections that year. It did not contest any further national elections.
