= 1931 Hungarian parliamentary election =

- 28–30 June 1931

All 245 elected seats in the Diet 123 seats needed for a majority
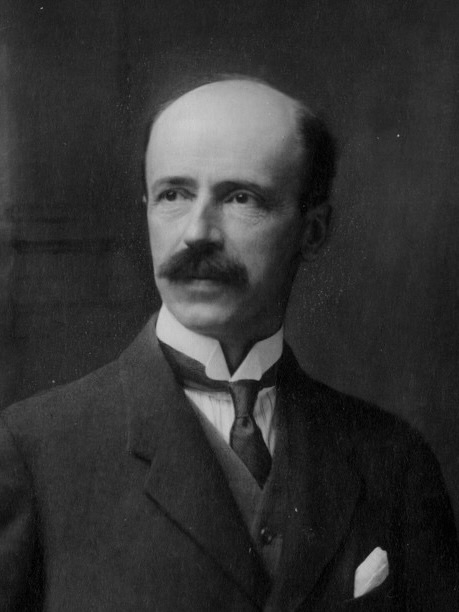

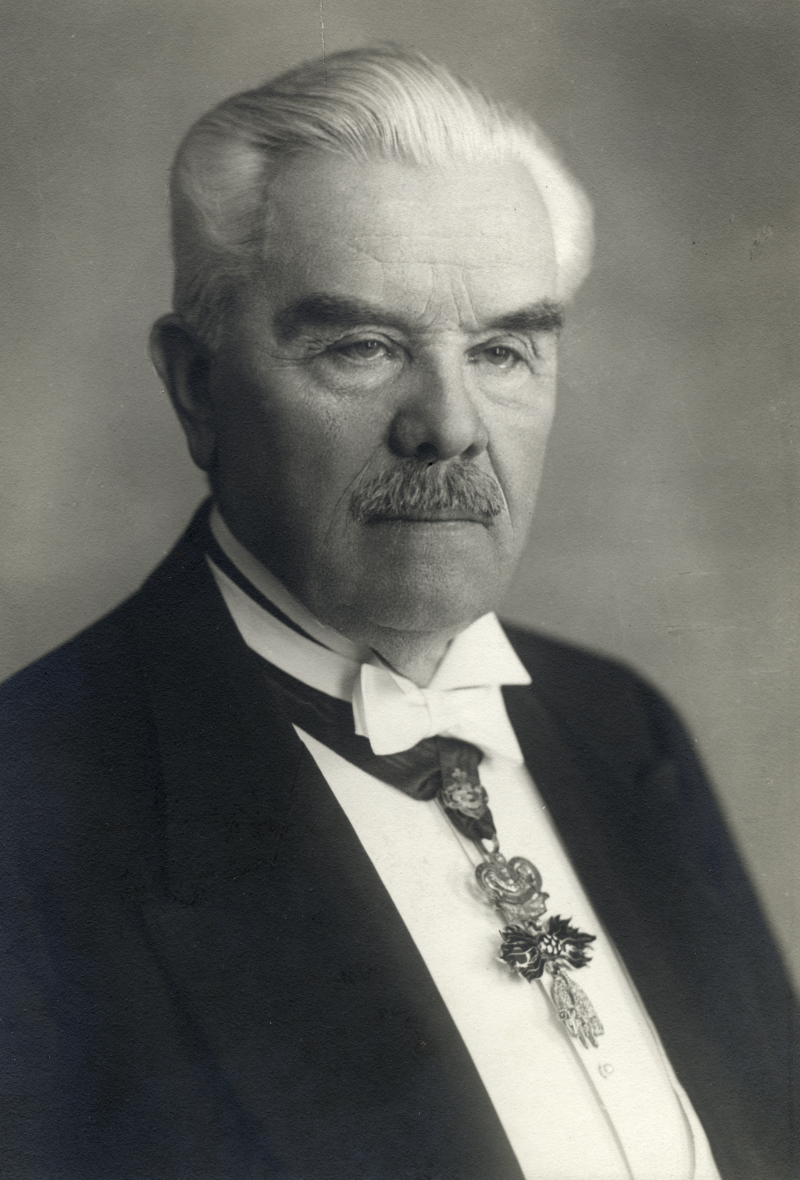

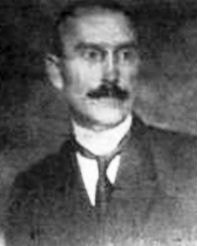

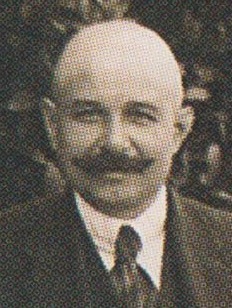
	First party	Second party
Leader	István Bethlen	János Zichy
Party	KKFKgP	KGSZP
Seats won	149 / 245	32 / 245
Popular vote	603,576	184,618
Percentage	39.96%	12.22%
	Third party	Fourth party
Leader	Gaszton Gaál	Károly Peyer
Party	FKgP	MSZDP
Seats won	10 / 245	14 / 245
Popular vote	173,477	165,794
Percentage	11.48%	10.98%
Prime Minister before election
István Bethlen
KKFKgP
Prime Minister after election
István Bethlen
KKFKgP

Parliamentary elections were held in Hungary between 28 and 30 June 1931. The result was a victory for the Unity Party, which won 149 of the 245 seats in Parliament. István Bethlen remained Prime Minister, but resigned on 24 August due to the effects of the Great Depression and was replaced by Gyula Károlyi.

== Electoral system ==
The electoral system remained the same as in 1926. There were 199 openly elected single-member constituencies and 11 secretly elected multi-member constituencies electing a total of 46 seats.

== Parties and leaders ==
Party	Leader
Christian Farmers, Smallholders and Civic Party (KKFKgP)	István Bethlen
Christian Economic and Social Party (KGSZP)	János Zichy
Independent Smallholders, Agrarian Workers and Civic Party (FKgP)	Gaszton Gaál
Social Democratic Party of Hungary (MSZDP)	Károly Peyer
Civic Freedom Party (ESZDP)	Károly Rassay
Christian Opposition (KE)	István Friedrich
National Democratic Party (NDP)	János Vázsonyi
National Radical Party (NRP)	Endre Bajcsy-Zsilinszky

== Results ==
Party	Votes	%	Seats	+/–
Unity Party	603,576	39.96	149	–12
Christian Economic and Social Party	184,618	12.22	32	–3
Independent Smallholders Party	173,477	11.48	10	New
Social Democratic Party of Hungary	165,794	10.98	14	0
Unofficial Unity Party candidates	84,156	5.57	8	–1
Unified Liberal Democratic Party	45,977	3.04	4	–
Party of Independence and '48	28,518	1.89	0	–1
Christian Opposition	17,880	1.18	2	New
National Democratic Party	15,930	1.05	2	New
Christian Socialist Party	10,996	0.73	1	New
Independent Civic Party	7,316	0.48	1	New
Christian Economic Opposition Party	7,109	0.47	1	New
National Radical Party	6,057	0.40	1	New
Christian National Opposition Party	5,318	0.35	1	New
Independent Left Party	5,213	0.35	1	New
Hungarian Agricultural Labourers and Workers Party	5,198	0.34	0	0
Allied Civic Parties	6,929	0.46	0	New
United National Party of Front Veterans	4,804	0.32	0	New
Racist Party	4,362	0.29	0	New
Smallholders	3,735	0.25	0	New
Agro-Democratic Party	3,567	0.24	1	New
United Opposition	2,891	0.19	1	New
Christian Social and Economic Party	2,343	0.16	0	New
Independent Christian Socialist Party	2,096	0.14	0	New
Győr City Economic Party	1,936	0.13	0	New
Smallholders, Craftsmen and Agricultural Workers Nagyatádi Party	1,586	0.10	0	New
Independents	109,127	7.22	16	+6
Total	1,510,509	100.00	245	0
Registered voters/turnout	1,907,112	–		
Source: Nohlen & Stöver

The total number of registered voters was 2,549,178, but only 1,907,112 were registered in contested constituencies for which figures are available.

=== By constituency type ===
Party	SMCs (Note: The number of votes refers to only 132 of the 199 single-member constituencies, as 67 seats were uncontested.)			MMCs			Total seats
Party	Votes	%	Seats	Votes	%	Seats	Total seats
Unity Party	483,149	45.26	138	120,427	27.18	11	149
Christian Economic and Social Party	118,898	11.14	24	65,720	14.83	8	32
Independent Smallholders Party	162,139	15.19	8	11,338	2.56	2	10
Social Democratic Party of Hungary	34,188	3.20	0	131,606	29.70	14	14
Unofficial Unity Party candidates	84,156	7.88	8				8
Unified Liberal Democratic Party				45,977	10.38	4	4
Party of Independence and '48	28,518	2.67	0				0
Christian Opposition	1,647	0.15	0	16,233	3.66	2	2
National Democratic Party	1,671	0.16	0	14,259	3.22	2	2
Christian Socialist Party	6,413	0.60	1	4,583	1.03	0	1
Independent Civic Party				7,316	1.65	1	1
Christian Economic Opposition Party	7,109	0.67	1				1
National Radical Party	6,057	0.57	1				1
Christian National Opposition Party				5,318	1.20	1	1
Independent Left Party				5,213	1.18	1	1
Hungarian Agricultural Labourers and Workers Party	5,198	0.49	0				0
Allied Civic Parties				6,929	1.56	0	0
United National Party of Front Veterans	1,277	0.12	0	3,527	0.80	0	0
Racist Party	4,362	0.41	0				0
Smallholders	3,735	0.35	0				0
Agro-Democratic Party	3,567	0.33	1				1
United Opposition	2,891	0.27	1				1
Christian Social and Economic Party	2,343	0.22	0				0
Independent Christian Socialist Party	2,096	0.20	0				0
Győr City Economic Party				1,936	0.44	0	0
Smallholders, Craftsmen and Agricultural Workers Nagyatádi Party	1,586	0.15	0				0
Independents	106,446	9.97	16	2,681	0.61	0	16
Total	1,067,446	100.00	199	443,063	100.00	46	245
Valid votes	1,067,446	100.00					
Invalid/blank votes	0	0.00					
Total votes	1,067,446	100.00					
Registered voters/turnout	1,322,080	80.74		585,032	–		
Source: Nohlen & Stöver
