= László Kapolyi =

Hungarian politician (1932–2014)

László Kapolyi (7 June 1932 — 28 November 2014) was a Hungarian mining engineer, businessman and politician, member of the Hungarian Academy of Sciences. His research areas included rock mechanics as well as energy management and policy. Between 1983 and 1987 he was Hungary's Minister for Industry. Between 1994 and 2012 and from 2013 he was chairman of the Hungarian Social Democratic Party and between 2002 and 2010 a Member of Parliament sitting with the Hungarian Socialist Party group.
