= Prime Minister of Hungary =

Head of government

- Magyarország miniszterelnöke
- Coat of arms used by the Prime Minister

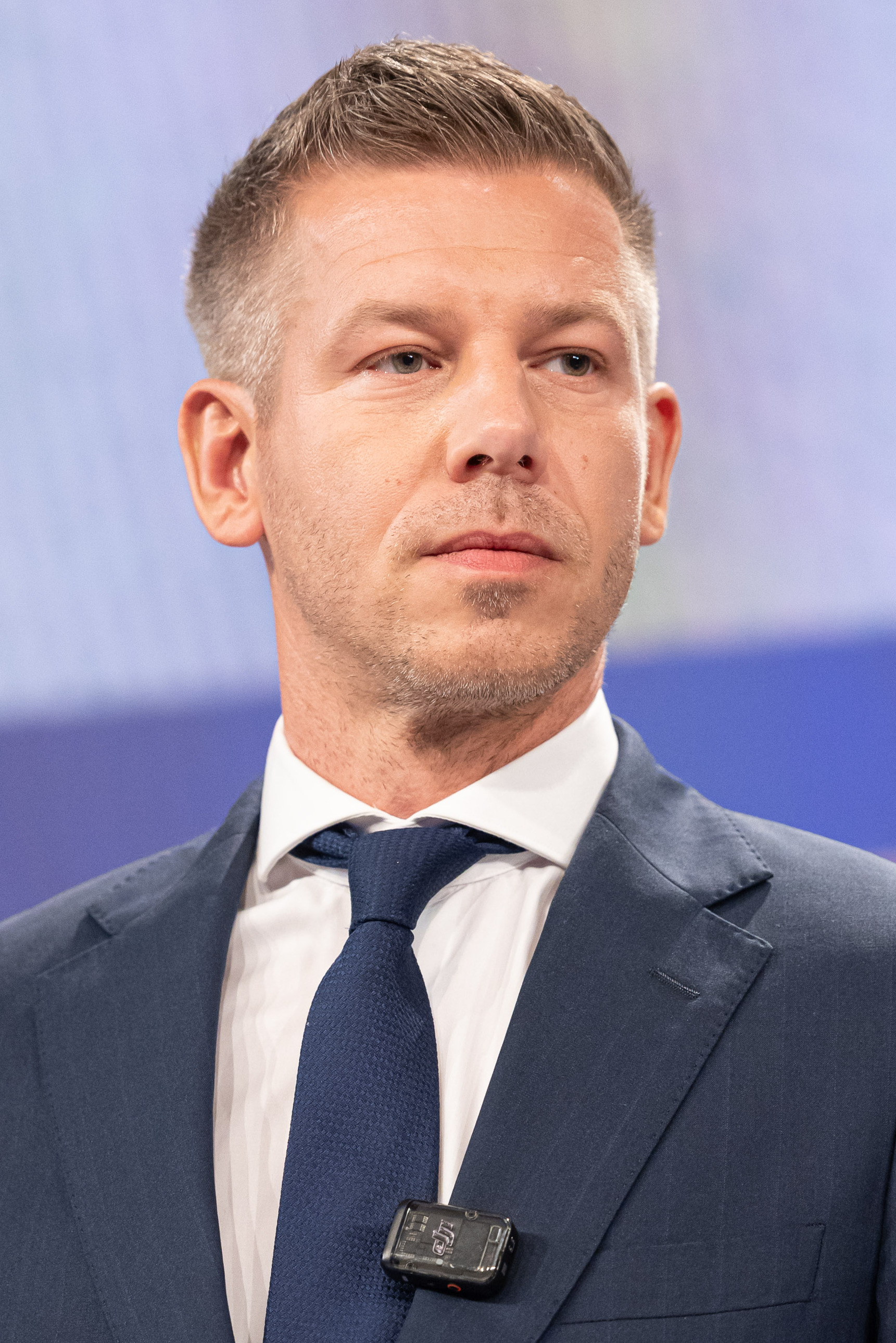
- Incumbent; Péter Magyar since 9 May 2026
- Executive branch of the Hungarian Government; Cabinet Office of the Prime Minister; Prime Minister's Office
- Style: Mr. Prime Minister (informal); His Excellency (diplomatic)
- Type: Head of government
- Member of: Cabinet; European Council; Parliament
- Reports to: Parliament
- Seat: 5 Alkotmány Street, Budapest
- Nominator: President
- Appointer: Elected by National Assembly
- Term length: Four years (renewable once)
- Constituting instrument: April Laws (historic); Fundamental Law (current)
- Precursor: Palatine
- Inaugural holder: Lajos Batthyány
- Formation: 7 March 1848
- Deputy: Deputy prime minister
- Salary: 7,100,000 Ft / US$21,030 monthly
- Website: The Prime Minister's Office

The prime minister of Hungary (Hungarian: Magyarország miniszterelnöke, lit. 'minister-president of Hungary') is the head of government of Hungary. The prime minister and the Cabinet are collectively accountable for their policies and actions to the National Assembly, which is directly elected by universal suffrage at least once every four years. The current holder of the office is Péter Magyar, who has served since 9 May 2026.

According to the Fundamental Law of Hungary, the prime minister is nominated by the president of Hungary and formally elected by the National Assembly. Constitutionally, the president is required to nominate the leader of the political party that wins a majority of seats in the National Assembly as prime minister. When there is no party with a majority, the president holds an audience with the leaders of all parliamentary parties and nominates the person most likely to command a majority in the Assembly; the Assembly then elects this person with a simple majority. Historically, when this situation has occurred, the prime minister has been the leader of the party that won a plurality of votes in the election or the leader of the governing coalition's senior partner party.

Since 2026, the Fundamental Law limits the premiership to a maximum of eight years, equivalent to two parliamentary terms in office, regardless of consecution.

== Official title ==
The title of Hungary's head of government in Hungarian is miniszterelnök. Translated, this means "minister-president". However, since "prime minister" or "premier" is the more usual title in a parliamentary system for a head of government in English-speaking nations, the title is translated as "prime minister" by most English sources.

== History ==
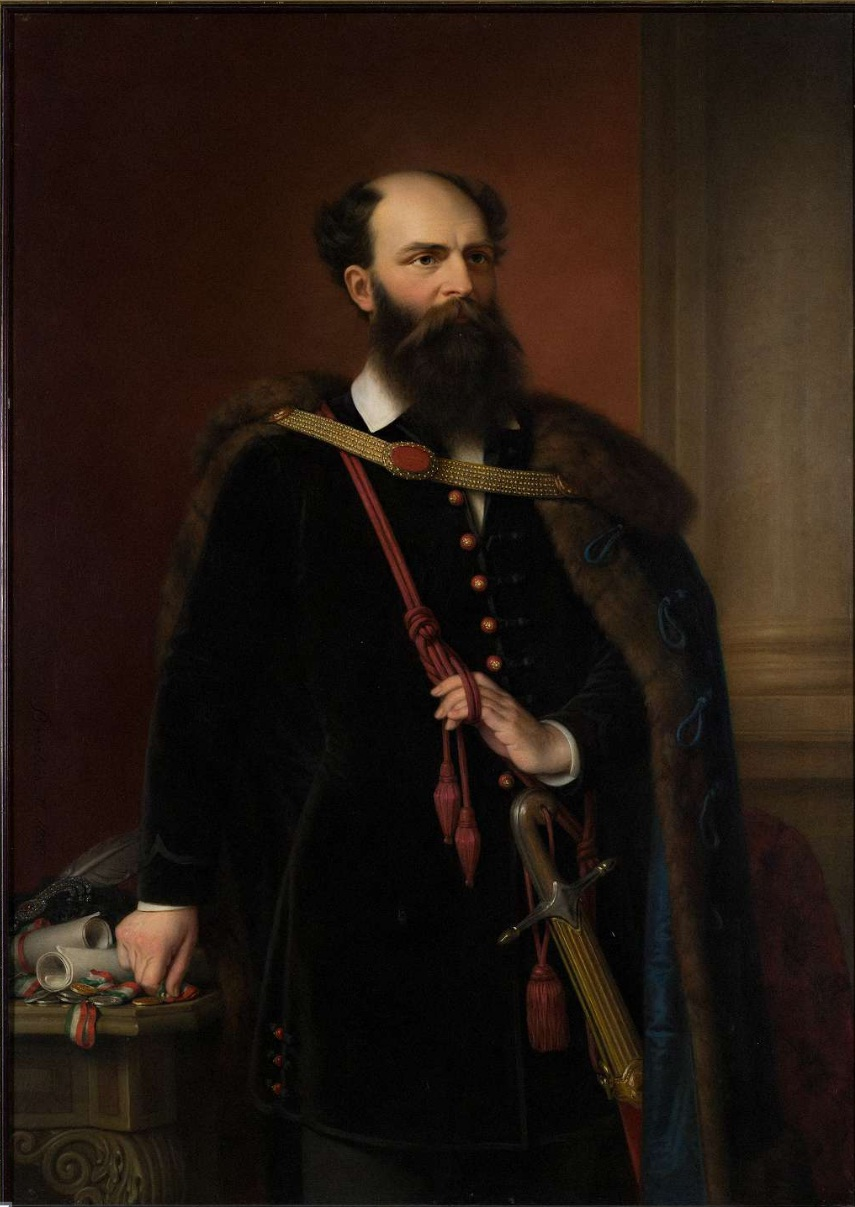
Portrait of Count Lajos Batthyány by Miklós Barabás, 1848. He was appointed as Hungary's first Prime Minister.

The longest-serving prime minister is Viktor Orbán, who held the position from 6 July 1998 to 27 May 2002 and from 29 May 2010 to 9 May 2026. He surpassed Kálmán Tisza as the longest-serving prime minister on 30 November 2020, with (if the years are counted cumulatively) a total of 20 years of service.

=== Palatine of Hungary ===
The palatine (Latin: comes palatii, comes palatinus, later palatinus (regni), Hungarian: nádorispán/nádor, Slovak: nádvorný župan / nádvorný špán, later: palatín/nádvorník, German: Palatin) was the highest dignitary in the Kingdom of Hungary after the king (a kind of powerful Prime Minister and supreme judge) from the kingdom's rise up to 1848/1918.

Initially, he was the representative of the king; later, the vice-regent (viceroy). In the early centuries of the kingdom, he was appointed by the king, later elected by the Diet of the Kingdom of Hungary. After the Habsburgs solidified their hold of Hungary, the dignity became an appointed position once again. Finally, it became hereditary in a cadet (junior) branch of the Habsburg dynasty after King Francis appointed his brother Joseph.

=== Creation of the position ===
During the Hungarian Revolution of 1848, the revolutionaries wanted the creation of a Hungarian cabinet which would be independent from the Austrian Empire and the Buda Chancellery (which was an office of the imperial governor-general). One of the 12 points said: 2. A responsible government in Buda-Pest.

Ferdinand V appointed Count Lajos Batthyány for the position of prime minister of Hungary on 17 March 1848. The government was called ministry, different from the current acceptance. The ministries were called departments. The position was vacant after the defeat of the freedom fight.

== See also ==
- List of prime ministers of Hungary by tenure
- List of prime ministers of Hungary (graphical)
- Deputy Prime Minister of Hungary
- List of heads of state of Hungary
- List of Hungarian monarchs
- List of palatines of Hungary
