= Christian National Union Party =

Christian National Union Party Keresztény Nemzeti Egyesülés Pártja
- Leader: Károly Wolff
- Founded: October 1919
- Dissolved: 1926
- Merger of: KSZGP, KNP
- Merged into: KGSZP
- Ideology: National conservatism Habsburg legitimism Political Catholicism; Antisemitism
- Political position: Right-wing to far-right

The Christian National Union Party (Keresztény Nemzeti Egyesülés Pártja, KNEP) was a political party in Hungary during the early 1920s.

== History ==
The KNEP was established by Károly Wolff in October 1919 as the Christian National League, and was based on the pre-war Christian Party. It was renamed the Christian National Union Party shortly afterwards. In the January 1920 parliamentary elections it won 82 seats, finishing second behind the National Smallholders and Agricultural Labourers Party. The two parties formed a coalition government on 15 March.

Due to the presence of a number of strong personalities, including Sándor Ernszt, István Friedrich, Gyula Andrássy the Younger, Károly Huszár and Pál Teleki, the party quickly began to fragment, and by the spring of 1921 it had lost much of its strength. It continued under Wolff's leadership, and became known as the Wolff Party. The 1922 elections saw the party reduced to just 10 seats. It did not contest any further elections, and around 1930 it merged with the Christian National Economic Party to form the Christian Economic and Social Party.

== Ideology ==
The party aimed to promote the interest of Catholics, and had a reactionary, anti-semitic programme. It was pro-Habsburg, believing that Charles IV of Hungary remained the legitimate King of Hungary, and pro-German in foreign policy.
