= 1926 Hungarian parliamentary election =

- 8–15 December 1926

All 245 elected seats in the Diet 123 seats needed for a majority
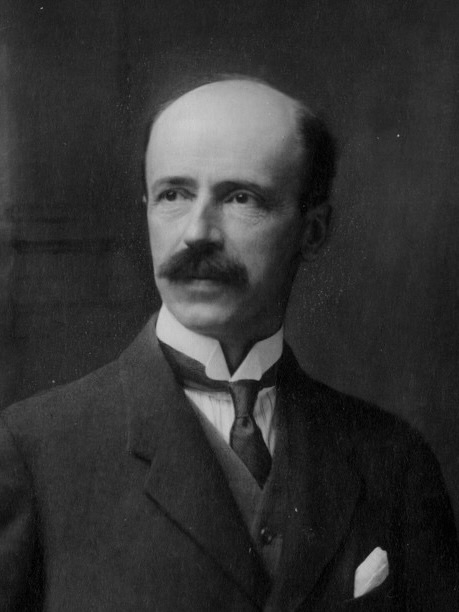

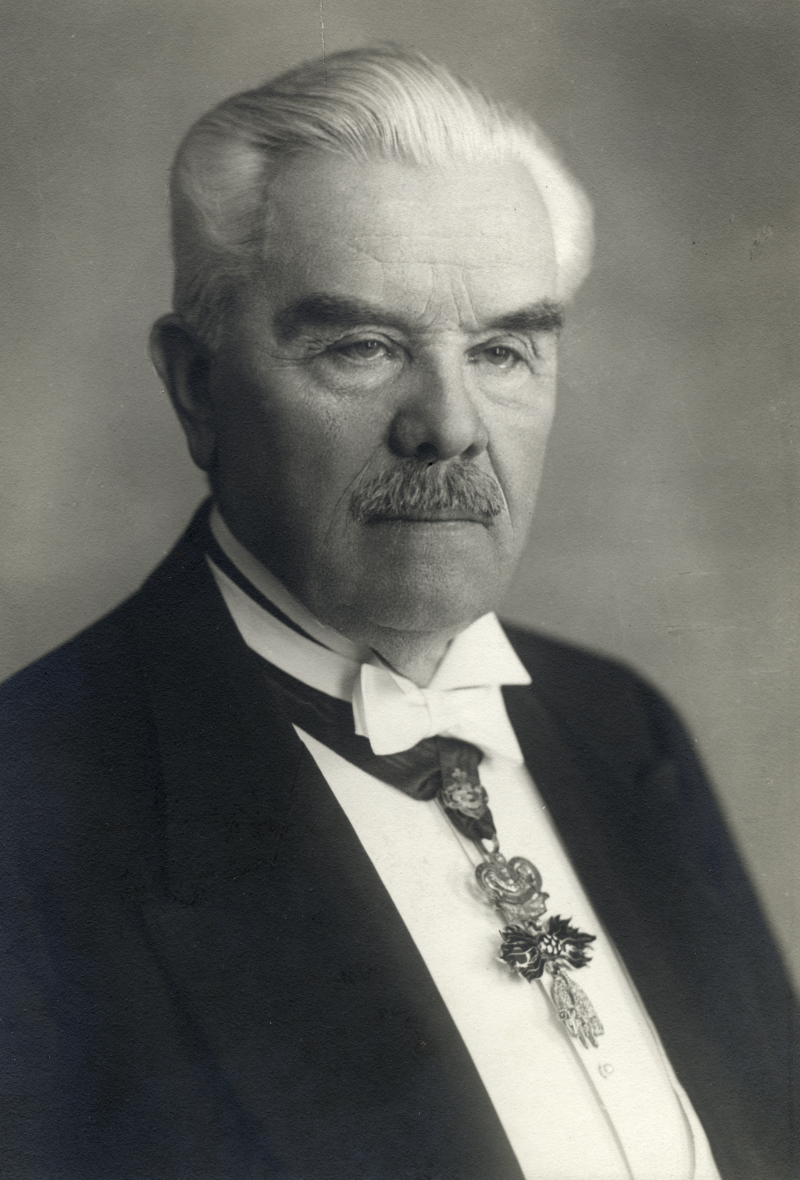

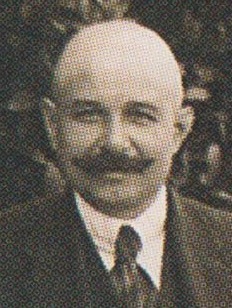
	First party	Second party
Leader	István Bethlen	János Zichy
Party	KKFKgP	KNP
Seats won	161 / 245	35 / 245
Popular vote	482,086	175,275
Percentage	42.16%	15.33%
	Third party	Fourth party
Leader	Károly Peyer	Károly Rassay
Party	MSZDP	FKFPP
Seats won	14 / 245	9 / 245
Popular vote	126,824	90,132
Percentage	11.09%	7.88%
Prime Minister before election
István Bethlen
KKFKgP
Prime Minister after election
István Bethlen
KKFKgP

Parliamentary elections were held in Hungary between 8 and 15 December 1926. The result was a victory for the Unity Party, which won 161 of the 245 seats in Parliament. István Bethlen remained Prime Minister.

== Electoral system ==
Prior to the election the electoral system was changed again. In the previous elections there had been 219 constituencies, of which 195 were openly elected single-member constituencies, 20 of which were secretly elected single-member constituencies, and four of which were secretly elected multi-member constituencies. For this election there were 199 openly elected single-member constituencies and 11 secretly elected multi-member constituencies electing a total of 46 seats.

== Parties and leaders ==
Party	Leader
Christian Farmers, Smallholders and Civic Party (KKFKgP)	István Bethlen
Christian National Economic Party (KNP)	János Zichy
Social Democratic Party of Hungary (MSZDP)	Károly Peyer
Civic Freedom Party (FKFPP)	Károly Rassay
Hungarian National Independence Party (MNFP)	Gyula Gömbös
Agrarian Party (AP)	Gaszton Gaál
Party of Independence and '48 (F48P)	Vince Nagy
National Party of the Lower-Middle Class (KPOP)	Lajos Szilágyi

== Results ==
Party	Votes	%	Seats	+/–
Unity Party	482,086	42.16	161	+21
Christian National Economic Party	175,275	15.33	35	New
Social Democratic Party of Hungary	126,824	11.09	14	–11
Unofficial Unity Party candidates	97,474	8.52	9	New
United Left (FKFPP–NDP)	90,132	7.88	9	+2
Hungarian National Independence Party	43,263	3.78	2	New
Agrarian Party	16,355	1.43	3	New
Party of Independence and '48	13,564	1.19	1	0
Independent '48 Smallholders Party	9,963	0.87	0	New
Hungarian Agricultural Labourers and Workers Party	4,317	0.38	0	New
Hungarian National Socialist Party	1,118	0.10	0	New
National Party of the Lower-Middle Class			1	New
Independents	83,148	7.27	10	–16
Total	1,143,519	100.00	245	0
Valid votes	1,143,519	99.09		
Invalid/blank votes	10,474	0.91		
Total votes	1,153,993	100.00		
Registered voters/turnout	1,504,227	76.72		
Source: Nohlen & Stöver

The total number of registered voters was 2,231,972, but only 1,504,227 were registered in contested seats.

=== By constituency type ===
Party	SMCs (Note: The number of votes refers to only 109 of the 199 single-member constituencies as 90 seats were uncontested.)			MMCs (Note: The number of votes refers to ten of the eleven MMCs as one constituency was uncontested.)			Total seats
Party	Votes	%	Seats	Votes	%	Seats	Total seats
Unity Party	389,529	50.33	150	92,557	25.05	11	161
Christian National Economic Party	100,492	12.98	25	74,783	20.24	10	35
Social Democratic Party of Hungary	18,903	2.44	0	107,921	29.21	14	14
Unofficial Unity Party candidates	97,474	12.59	9				9
United Left (FKFPP–NDP)	20,439	2.64	0	69,693	18.86	9	9
Hungarian National Independence Party	22,428	2.90	1	20,835	5.64	1	2
Agrarian Party	16,355	2.11	3				3
Party of Independence and '48	9,848	1.27	0	3,716	1.01	1	1
Independent '48 Smallholders Party	9,963	1.29	0				0
Hungarian Agricultural Labourers and Workers Party	4,317	0.56	0				0
Hungarian National Socialist Party	1,118	0.14	0				0
National Party of the Lower-Middle Class			1				1
Independents	83,148	10.74	10				10
Total	774,014	100.00	199	369,505	100.00	46	245
Valid votes	774,014	100.00		369,505	97.24		
Invalid/blank votes	0	0.00		10,474	2.76		
Total votes	774,014	100.00		379,979	100.00		
Registered voters/turnout	986,165	78.49		518,062	73.35		
Source: Nohlen & Stöver
