= Social Democratic Party of Hungary =

Social Democratic Party of Hungary Magyarországi Szociáldemokrata Párt
- Abbreviation: MSZDP
- Chairman: László Hasilló
- Presidium: Sándor Szőcs; Edit Gavri; Zsolt Csiszár; István Halász; Zoltán Tóth
- Spokesperson: Zoltán Papp
- Vice President: Zoltán Papp
- Founder: Pál Gábor Engelmann
- Founded: 12 December 1890 October 1956 (as SZDP) 9 January 1989
- Dissolved: 12 June 1948 November 1956
- Preceded by: General Workers Party of Hungary (MÁMP)
- Headquarters: 1107 Budapest, Somfa köz 17.
- Newspaper: Népszava (1890–1948)
- Youth wing: Social Democratic Youth Movement (SZIM)
- Ideology: Social democracy
- Political position: Centre-left to left-wing
- National affiliation: Leftist Platform
- Colours: Red
- National Assembly: 0 / 199
- European Parliament: 0 / 21

Website
- www.mszdp.hu

The Social Democratic Party of Hungary (Hungarian: Magyarországi Szociáldemokrata Párt, pronounced [ˈmɒɟɒrorsaːɡi ˈsot͡sijaːldɛmokrɒtɒ ˈpaːrt], MSZDP) is a social democratic political party in Hungary. Historically, the party was dissolved during the occupation of Hungary by Nazi Germany (1944–1945) and the communist period of Hungary from 1948 to 1989, after being forced into a merger with the Communist Party. It worked legally for a short time during the Revolution of 1956.

It was a government party as a part of the Károlyi Government (1918–1919), Berinkey Government, Peidl Government (1919), Interim National Assembly (1944–1945) and Dinnyés Government (1947–1948). It was reorganized after Hungary's transition from communism in 1989.

MSZDP used to be a member of the Socialist International and the Party of European Socialists until 2020, when it was delisted from both due to inactivity.

== Overview ==
Hungary as part of Austria-Hungary:

- 1868–1890 The General Workers Association (Általános Munkásegylet)
- 1890–1918 The Social Democratic Party of Hungary (Magyarországi Szociáldemokrata Párt) - independent party

Hungary as an independent country:

- 1918–1939 The Social Democratic Party of Hungary (Magyarországi Szociáldemokrata Párt) - independent party
- 1939–1948 The Social Democratic Party (Szociáldemokrata Párt) - merged with Hungarian Working Peoples Party
- October 1956 – November 1956 The Social Democratic Party (Szociáldemokrata Párt)
- 1989 Social Democratic Party of Hungary (Magyarországi Szociáldemokrata Párt)

== History up to 1989 ==
The party grew in power and influence until the First World War, which resulted in the party fracturing into pro-war and anti-war factions. The chaos which followed the war resulted in the collapse of the Dual Monarchy. The MSZDP leadership entered into government as part of an unsuccessful post-war socialist administration and subsequently Béla Kun's Communist dictatorship, which carried out a Red Terror against those deemed to be enemies of the revolution and the working class. When the Communist regime collapsed MSZDP supporters were killed in the subsequent anti-Communist backlash. The entire left-wing boycotted the elections of 1920, which resulted in a right-wing victory and continued right-wing government for the inter-war period.

Party emblem after 1945

The MSZDP made their peace with Miklós Horthy's government in 1921 with the Bethlen–Peyer pact. More radical elements were suppressed, and trade union activity was increasingly driven underground during the 1930s. After 1939, the party became known as the SZDP, dropping the "Magyarországi" moniker. The environment became increasingly hostile during the Second World War and activity virtually drained to a halt. With the Nazi takeover of Hungary in 1944, the party was declared illegal. Many of the leadership were executed, with the remainder imprisoned or driven underground.

The party was a member of the Labour and Socialist International between 1923 and 1940.

The MSZDP fought the election of November 1945, finishing in a strong second place. From 1945–1948, the MSZDP governed in association with the Smallholders' Party. With the establishment of the police state, members were increasingly pressured to co-operate with the Hungarian Communist Party. The grouping became the largest party in 1947, but came under increasing pressure to merge with the Communists. Eventually, the right-wing were forcibly excluded from the MSZDP, by the end of 1948 the MSZDP had ceased to function independently. This allowed what was left of the party to merge with the Communists to form the Soviet-sponsored Hungarian Working People's Party. However, the few independent-minded Social Democrats left in the party were quickly shunted aside, leaving the merged party as a renamed and enlarged Communist Party.

The MSZDP re-emerged defiantly in the Hungarian Revolution of 1956. Under the leadership of Anna Kéthly, Gyula Kelemen and József Fischer the MSZDP took a prominent role in Imre Nagy's Provisional Government. For the first time in many years the party newspaper Népszava was published independently. Following the suppression of the Revolution in 1956 and 1957, the MSZDP disappeared again under state repression, and much of the leadership escaped into exile.

The gradual softening of the official government policies in Hungary in the 1970s and 1980s led to many in the governing Hungarian Socialist Workers' Party (MSZMP) being associated with Reform Communism. This was sometimes not easily distinguishable from social democracy.

== History after the transition ==
In 1989 the MSZDP was re-founded, and took a prominent role in the transitional arrangements before the first elections. The MSZMP, now calling itself the Hungarian Socialist Party (MSZP), started with a large base of members, plenty of financial resources and a core electorate. The MSZP and MSZDP were in competition for the same left-wing support.

The transition period was marked by chaos in the newly reformed MSZDP. There were many disagreements throughout 1989 regarding the direction of the MSZDP, and a breakaway was established in November 1989 as the "Historical" Social Democratic Party (SZDP or tSZDP). The SZDP claimed to be the ideological successor to the "anti-communist" MSZDP of 1945–1948 and 1956. Another breakaway party also emerged in 1989 - the Independent Social Democratic Party (FSZDP). The results of the 1990 elections under the leadership of Anna Petrasovits was a huge disappointment to the MSZDP, as the reconstituted party failed to reach the 5% parliamentary threshold. Following the replacement of Petrasovits, Endre Borbély and Zoltán Király held the position for a year respectively.

Following the defeats in 1990 and 1994, the MSZDP has failed to cross the threshold into Parliament at every subsequent election. Whilst retaining its separate status, it has become even further linked to the MSZP. Its leader (since 1994), László Kapolyi, was elected to Parliament in 2002 as part of a joint MSZP–MSZDP ticket. Between 2002 and 2010, he sat with the MSZP in Parliament, as a normal MSZP MP, and after 2007 he was joined by Gábor Hárs, a 'defector' from the MSZP.

In 2007 and 2008, further defections from the MSZP to the MSZDP in Óbuda and Zugló resulted in some pressure to more clearly define an independent social democratic perspective to differentiate the party from the MSZP. In response to this, László Kapolyi tried to prevent further defections from joining, under pressure from the MSZP's leadership. However, pressure from the remaining membership of the MSZDP has created tensions. In November 2009, a number of local MSZDP associations made autonomous decisions to form electoral alliances with the Green Left, regardless of the MSZDP's national leadership. Due to the leadership's close ties to the MSZP, the MSZDP was unable to capitalise upon the MSZP's growing unpopularity in the run-up to the 2010 Hungarian parliamentary election, and it was doubtful that it had a membership of more than 100 active subscribers.

On its 45th Congress on 8 October 2011, Kapolyi was re-elected as chairman, and Andor Schmuck was elected as general secretary. At the 46th Congress on 24 November 2012, long serving chairman Kapolyi was not running again for re-election, Schmuck was elected as his successor. On 26 May 2013, an attempt was made to officially dissolve the MSZDP, with a small successor party established as the Hungarian Social Democrats' Party (Szocdemek) under the leadership of Andor Schmuck whilst excluding former leader László Kapolyi. The decision of the Congress has since been challenged. Political opponents of Schmuck elected Kapolyi chairman again. The Social Democratic Party under Kapolyi participated in the 2014 general election, as well as Schmuck's new party, which took most of the members and large part of the infrastructure of the MSZDP. László Kapolyi died on 29 November 2014 after a long illness. Since 2014 there have been ongoing challenges to the legal status of the MSZDP, and its current legal status is unclear. The MSZDP did not participate in the 2018 general election and party leader László Hasilló endorsed Gergely Karácsony and his MSZP–Dialogue electoral alliance. In 2020 MSZDP was delisted from the Party of European Socialists and the Socialist International due to inactivity.

Party director Dániel Cséplő announced in July 2021 that MSZDP intends to participate in the 2021 opposition primary and requested the inclusion of his party to the six-member opposition election cooperation, with the similar conditions as the New World People's Party (ÚVNP). The six parties, however, refused the request. MSZDP also endorsed the candidacy of centre-right politician Péter Márki-Zay as prime minister of the united opposition. After rejection, Cséplő announced MSZDP intends to take part in the 2022 parliamentary election with separate candidates and national list. In early 2022 MSZDP announced on its website that MSZDP and Workers' Party of Hungary 2006 – European Left will cooperate in preparation for the 2022 parliamentary election. However, the party's registration was refused by the National Election Office (NVI) due to for administrative reasons. The leadership of MSZDP endorsed United for Hungary thereafter.

== Election results ==
Election year	National Assembly				Government
Election year	# of overall votes	% of overall vote	# of overall seats won	+/–	Government
1920	MSZDP boycotted the election due to the White Terror				
1922	277,481	17% (#2)	25 / 245	New	in opposition
1926	126,824	11.1% (#3)	14 / 245	▼11	in opposition
1931	165,794	11% (#4)	14 / 245	0	in opposition
1935	132,052	6.7% (#4)	11 / 245	▼3	in opposition
1939	126,637	3.4% (#4)	5 / 260	▼6	in opposition
1944		(#2)	125 / 498	▲120	in government
1945	823,250	17.4% (#2)	69 / 409	▼56	in government
1947	742,171	14.86% (#4)	67 / 411	▼2	in government
1990	174,409	3.6% (#8)	0 / 386		extra-parliamentary
1994	51,122	0.9% (#11)	0 / 386	0	extra-parliamentary
1998	5,689	0.1%	0 / 386	0	extra-parliamentary
2002^{1}	41,461	0.7%	1 / 386	▲1	extra-parliamentary
2006^{2}	did not participate		1 / 386	0	extra-parliamentary
2010	4,117	0.08%	0 / 386	▼1	extra-parliamentary
2014	937	0.02%	0 / 199	0	extra-parliamentary

^{1} Joint individual candidates with the Hungarian Socialist Party (MSZP). Party President László Kapolyi was elected MP and joined MSZP parliamentary group.

^{2} Kapolyi was elected MP from the National List of MSZP. In 2008, Socialist MP Gábor Hárs left his party and joined MSZDP.

== General Secretaries then Presidents ==
- Pál Gábor Engelmann (1890–1892)
- Manó Buchinger (1905–1919)

Party merged to Socialist Party of Hungary (1919)

- Gyula Peidl (1919)
- Károly Peyer (1919–1938)
- Árpád Szakasits (1938–1942)
- György Marosán (1942–1945)
- Árpád Szakasits (1945–1948)

Party merged to Hungarian Working People's Party (1948–1956)

- Anna Kéthly (1956)

Party disbanded (1956–1989)

- Anna Petrasovits (1989–1992)
- Endre Borbély (1992–1993)
- Zoltán Király (1993–1994)
- László Kapolyi (1994–2012)
- Andor Schmuck (2012–2013)
- László Kapolyi (2013–2014)
- László Andráska (2015–2017)
- László Hasilló (since 2017)

== See also ==
- Independent Socialist Party (Hungary)
- Reorganized Social Democratic Party of Hungary
