= Fascism in Europe =

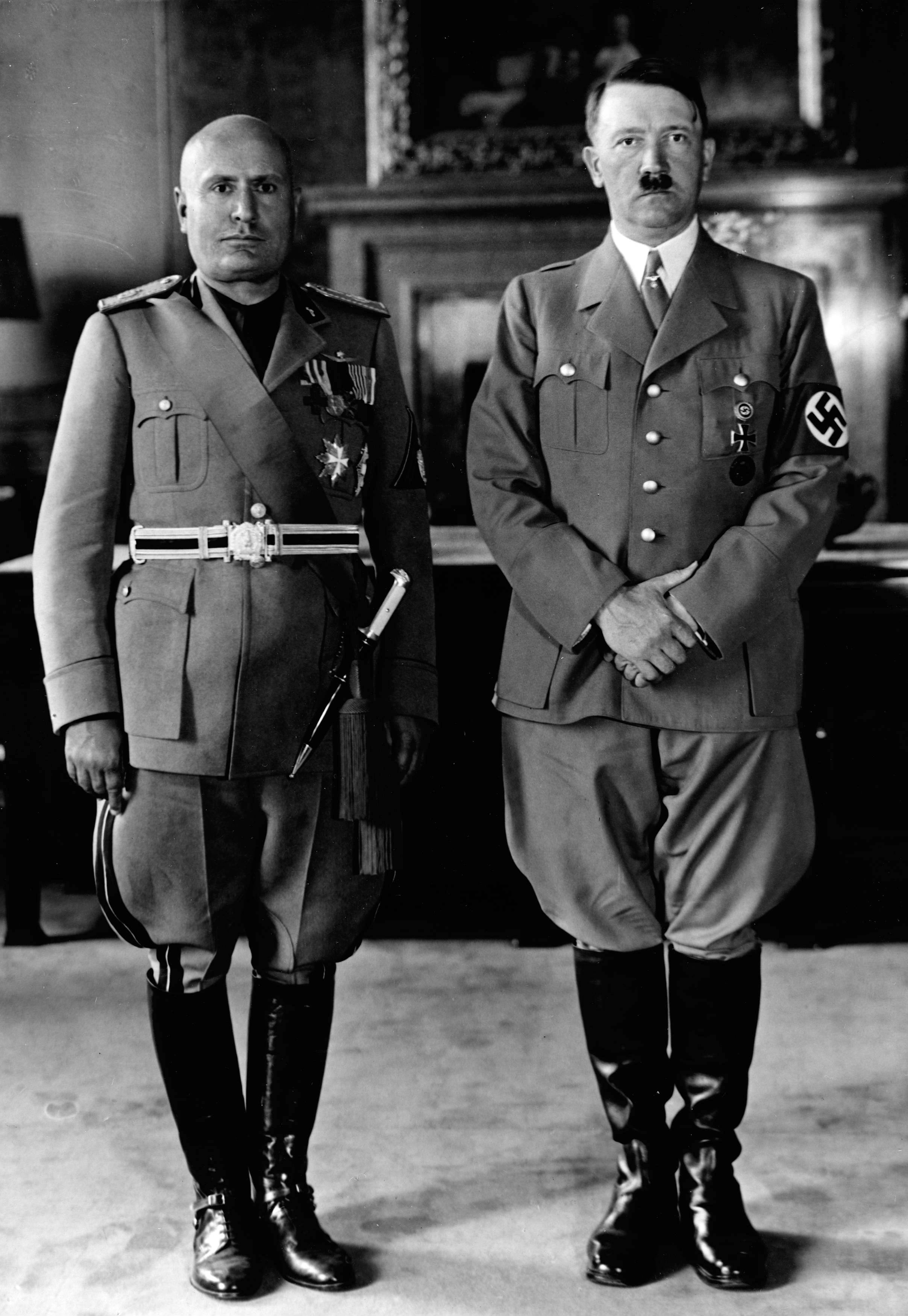
Benito Mussolini and Adolf Hitler, fascist leaders of the Kingdom of Italy, and the Third Reich

Fascist movements in Europe were the set of various fascist ideologies which were practiced by governments and political organizations in Europe during the 20th century. Fascism was born in Italy following World War I, and other fascist movements, influenced by Italian fascism, subsequently emerged across Europe. Among the political doctrines which are identified as ideological origins of fascism in Europe are the combining of a traditional national unity and revolutionary anti-democratic rhetoric which was espoused by the integral nationalist Charles Maurras and the revolutionary syndicalist Georges Sorel.

The earliest foundations of fascism in practice can be seen in the Italian Regency of Carnaro, led by the Italian nationalist Gabriele D'Annunzio, many of whose politics and aesthetics were subsequently used by Benito Mussolini and his Italian Fasces of Combat which Mussolini had founded as the Fasces of Revolutionary Action in 1914. Despite the fact that its members referred to themselves as "fascists", the ideology was based around national syndicalism. The ideology of fascism would not fully develop until 1921, when Mussolini transformed his movement into the National Fascist Party, which then in 1923 incorporated the Italian Nationalist Association. The INA established fascist tropes such as colored shirt uniforms and also received the support of important proto-fascists like D'Annunzio and nationalist intellectual Enrico Corradini.

The first declaration of the political stance of fascism was the Fascist Manifesto, written by national syndicalist Alceste De Ambris and futurist poet Filippo Tommaso Marinetti and published in 1919. Many of the policies advanced in the manifesto, such as centralization, abolition of the senate, formation of national councils loyal to the state, expanded military power, and support for militias (Blackshirts, for example) were adopted by Mussolini's regime, while other calls such as universal suffrage and a peaceful foreign policy were abandoned. De Ambris later became a prominent anti-fascist. In 1932, "The Doctrine of Fascism", an essay by Mussolini and Giovanni Gentile, provided an outline of fascism that better represented Mussolini's regime.

== Regimes and parties ==
Political parties in Europe often described as fascist or being strongly influenced by fascism include:

- The National Fascist Party/Republican Fascist Party in the Kingdom of Italy and the Italian Social Republic under Benito Mussolini (1922–1945);
- The National Socialist German Workers' Party (Nazi Party) in Nazi Germany under Adolf Hitler (1933–1945) – Based on the ideology of National Socialism, much of which was heavily influenced or taken wholesale from Italian fascism;
- The National Union in Portugal under António de Oliveira Salazar and Marcelo Caetano (1933–1974) (Salazar rejected the label of fascist criticizing the "exaltation of youth, the cult of force through direct action, the principle of the superiority of state political power in social life, and the propensity for organising masses behind a single leader", however his regime adopted many fascist characteristics with the Legião Portuguesa, the Mocidade Portuguesa, and Corporatism being the most prominent examples; after 1945 Salazar distanced his regime from fascism)
- The Fatherland Front in Austria under Engelbert Dollfuss and Kurt Schuschnigg (1934–1938) – Based on the ideology of Austrofascism, which was heavily influenced by Italian fascism.
- The Yugoslav National Movement in Kingdom of Yugoslavia under Dimitrije Ljotić (1935-1945). Yugoslav clerical fascist movement and organization received considerable German financial and political assistance during the interwar period.
- The 4th of August Regime in Greece under Ioannis Metaxas (1936–1941) – The Metaxist regime adopted many fascist characteristics with the EON being an example of this. The regime was based around Metaxism, which was influenced by fascism.
- The Falange Española Tradicionalista y de las JONS in Spain under Francisco Franco (1939–1975). – After 1945, Franco's regime distanced itself from fascism; however, it remained highly authoritarian and nationalist, still maintaining some Falangist principles.

There were multiple regimes in the Kingdom of Romania that were influenced by fascism. These include the National Christian Party under Octavian Goga (1938), Party of the Nation under Ion Gigurtu (1940), and the National Legionary State which was led by the Iron Guard under Horia Sima in conjunction with the Romanian military dictatorship under Ion Antonescu (1940–1941). The first two of these regimes were not completely fascist however used fascism to appeal to the growing far-right sympathies amongst the populace. The military dictatorship of Ion Antonescu (1941–1944) is also often considered fascist.

Prior to and during the Second World War, Nazi Germany and its allies imposed numerous anti-democratic regimes and collaborationist dictatorships across German-occupied Europe, whose characterization was authoritarian, nationalist, anti-communist, and staunchly pro-Axis powers:

- The Sammarinese Fascist Party in San Marino under Giuliano Gozi (1923–1943)
- The National Partnership in Czechia under Emil Hácha (1939–1945)
- The Slovak People's Party in Slovakia under Jozef Tiso (1939–1945)
- The Vichy Regime supported by collaborationist parties (Marcel Bucard's Mouvement Franciste, Jacques Doriot's French Popular Party, Marcel Déat's National Popular Rally), and Joseph Darnand's Milice in France under Philippe Pétain and Pierre Laval (1940–1944)
- The Ustaše in Croatia under Ante Pavelić (1941–1945)
- The Collaborationist government supported by National Union of Greece and Greek National Socialist Party in Greece under Georgios Tsolakoglou, Konstantinos Logothetopoulos, and Ioannis Rallis (1941–1944)
- The Collaborationist government supported by Dimitrije Ljotić's Yugoslav National Movement in Serbia under Milan Nedić (1941–1944)
- The Nasjonal Samling in Norway under Vidkun Quisling (1942–1945)
- The Arrow Cross Party in Hungary under Ferenc Szálasi (1944–1945)
- Konrad Henlein's Sudeten German Party, Anton Mussert's NSB, Léon Degrelle's Rexist Party, and Staf De Clercq's VNV were also given significant power in occupied Europe.

There were also a number of political movements active in Europe that were influenced in part by some features of Mussolini's regime. These include: Le Faisceau, British Fascists, British Union of Fascists, Imperial Fascist League, Blueshirts, French National-Collectivist Party, Breton National Party, Falange Española, Black Front, National Syndicalist Movement, Verdinaso, Nationale Front, Greek National Socialist Party, Vlajka, National Fascist Community, ONR-Falanga, Patriotic People's Movement, Pērkonkrusts, Union of Bulgarian National Legions, Ratniks and the Russian Fascist Party (based in Manchuria).

Prominent figures associated with European fascism outside of the Axis include Oswald Mosley, Rotha Lintorn-Orman, José Antonio Primo de Rivera, Joris Van Severen, Corneliu Zelea Codreanu, Francisco Rolão Preto, Hristo Lukov, Aleksandar Tsankov, Bolesław Piasecki, Radola Gajda, Eoin O'Duffy, Birger Furugård, Sven Olov Lindholm, Vihtori Kosola, and Konstantin Rodzaevsky.

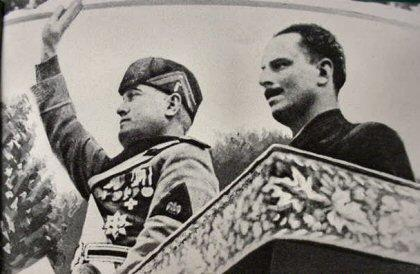
Benito Mussolini (left) with Oswald Mosley (right) during the latter's visit to fascist Italy in 1936

Other right-wing/far-right political parties such as the German National People's Party, CEDA, Danish Unity, Zveno, Party of Hungarian Life, Union of Mladorossi and the Fatherland League lacked the ideology of fascism but adopted some fascist characteristics. Far-right politicians like Alfred Hugenberg, José María Gil-Robles, and Gyula Gömbös represent fascism's influence on the right with these leaders adopting an ultra-nationalist and authoritarian rhetoric influenced by Mussolini and later Hitler's successes.

The nationalism espoused by these groups contrasted the internationalist focus of communism; there was little coordination between fascist movements prior to the Second World War; however. there was an attempt at unifying European fascists. The 1934 Montreux Fascist conference was a meeting held by members of a number of European fascist parties and movements and was organised by the Comitati d'Azione per l'Universalità di Roma, which received support from Mussolini. The first conference was open to many perspectives and failed to develop any unity amidst the many ideological conflicts among the delegates. The second conference was equally ineffective and more meetings were attempted.

=== Post-World War II ===
In the aftermath of World War II, most fascist regimes or regimes influenced by fascism were dismantled by the Allied forces, with only those in Spain and Portugal surviving, both of which remained neutral during the war. (Note: Scholarly opinion varies on whether Salazar's Portuguese National Union regime should be considered fascist or not. Some researchers, such as Juan José Linz, Stanley G. Payne Goffredo Adinolfi, António Costa Pinto, Renzo De Felice, Roger Griffin, Robert Paxton, Howard J. Wiarda, Stephen J. Lee, among others, consider the Portuguese Estado Novo to be conservative authoritarian rather than fascist. The most recent biographers of Salazar, Filipe Ribeiro de Meneses and Tom Gallagher also consider Salazar not to be a fascist. On the other hand scholars like Luis Reis Torgal Fernando Rosas, Avelãs Nunes, Manuel Villaverde Cabral Manuel de Lucena, D.L. Raby, and Eduardo Lourenço consider the Salazar regime to be fascist. Salazar himself criticized fascism which he considered a "pagan Caesarism". For Salazar's own views on Fascism see Salazar, António de Oliveira (2007). Como se levanta um estado. Lisboa: Aromic Books. ISBN 9789899537705.) (Note: Stanley Payne argues that Spanish fascism was solely Falange Española; Paul Preston agrees that Franco was not fascist by his personal beliefs, but argues that his regime was a fascist one. Ernst Nolte considered Franco's regime to be an example of "early Fascism") Parties, movements or politicians who carried the label "fascist" quickly became political pariahs with many nations across Europe banning any organisations or references relating to fascism and Nazism. With this came the rise of Neo-Fascism, movements like the Italian Social Movement, Socialist Reich Party and Union Movement attempted to continue fascism's legacy but failed to become mass movements.

European fascism influenced movements in the Americas. Both North America and South America would develop fascistic political groups rooted in the local European descended communities. These included the Chilean Nacistas, Brazilian Integralist Action, Argentine Civic Legion, Peruvian Revolutionary Union, National Synarchist Union, Revolutionary Mexicanist Action and the Silver Legion of America along with figures like Plínio Salgado, Gustavo Barroso, González von Marées, Salvador Abascal, Nicolás Carrasco, William Dudley Pelley and Adrien Arcand. Some historians also consider Argentine president Juan Perón and his ideology, Peronism as being influenced by European fascism, however, this has been disputed. Brazilian president, Getúlio Vargas, and his corporate regime known as the "New State" was also influenced by Mussolini's rule. European fascism was also influential in the European diaspora elsewhere in the world, in Australia Eric Campbell's Centre Party and the South African fascist movement, which included Oswald Pirow, being examples of this.

The rise of fascist activities and violence across Europe prompted governments to enact regulations to limit disturbances caused by fascists and other extremists. In a 1937 study, Karl Loewenstein provides the following list of examples:

1. Use of existing criminal codes
2. A ban on subversive movements
3. A ban on para-military wings of parties and political uniforms
4. A ban on offensive weaponry
5. New statutes that ban abuse of parliamentary procedures
6. Bans on incitement and agitation of violence
7. Bans on attempts to wreck meetings and assemblies
8. Prohibitions on certain forms of speech, such as false rumor, disparagement of institutions
9. Bans of publicly exalting criminals
10. Bans on subversive propaganda aimed at the national armed forces
11. Bans on anti-constitutional activities of public officials
12. Creation of police forces that work to suppress anti-democratic movements
13. Bans on secret foreign financial support for extremist parties and foreign propaganda

== Fascist electoral performance ==
In the interwar period many parties which in historiography are referred to as fascist, proto-fascist, para-fascist, quasi-fascist, fascist-like, fascistic, fascistoid or fascistized participated in general elections organized in their respective countries. Though in numerous cases the fascist denomination is doubted (e.g. in case of the Belgian Christus Rex or the Greek National Union), electoral results obtained demonstrate their scale of popular support among the population. The best-ever performance of such parties in specific countries is given in the below table.

Outcome of theoretically multi-party elections which were clearly manipulated is ignored as unrepresentative for genuine support which the party enjoyed, e.g. the result of Partito Nazionale Fascista in Italy of 1924.

In case of some countries the lifetime of a fascistoid party did not overlap with reasonably free general elections, though the party might have fared well in other elections, e.g. in local elections in Bulgaria of 1934 Народно социално движение gained 12% of the votes, the Frontist movement had some success during the "Frontist Spring" of 1933 in some cantonal elections in Switzerland, in local elections of Estonia in 1934 Eesti Vabadussõjalaste Kesklii won absolute majority of seats in 3 largest cities, while in local elections of France in 1938–1939 Parti Social Français garnered some 15% of the votes. Some parties, like National Corporate Party in Ireland or Le Faisceau in France existed so briefly that they hardly managed to take part in any type of elections. Other parties like the Fedrelandslaget (Note: Cooperated with the authoritarian but not outright anti-democratic Free-minded Liberal Party in the Norwegian elections of 1936.) or the Comités de Défense Paysanne (Note: Their youth wing leader Modeste Legouez was classified as Union républicaine démocratique (Parti républicain national) in the French elections of 1936.) only participated in electoral alliances.

In some countries fascist parties ignored electoral competition, like British Union of Fascists did in case of the UK elections of 1935. At times fascist parties abstained since elections were considered manipulated, like in case of Obóz Narodowo-Radykalny in Polish elections of 1935 and Estonian elections of 1934 were cancelled before the Vaps Movement could participate. Some referendums organized by fascist organizations October 1933 Estonian constitutional referendum or the 1935 Swiss constitutional referendum received higher support than the parties in national elections.

Country	Party	best election year	best electoral result (Note: typically the share of votes garnered. If this is impossible to calculate, usually due to block-voting on coalition lists, the share of seats in the parliament is given. Only includes multi-party elections.)
Austria	Heimatblock	1930	6.2%
Austria	Deutsche Nationalsozialistische Arbeiterpartei	1930	3.0%
Belgium	Rex	1936	11.5%
Belgium	Vlaams Nationaal Verbond	1936	7.1%
(Tsardom of Bulgaria (1908–1946)) Bulgaria	Народно социално движение	1939	3.2%
Czechoslovakia	Sudetendeutsche Partei	1935	15.2% (Note: SdP won roughly two-thirds of the Sudeten German votes.)
Czechoslovakia	Národní obec fašistická	1935	2.0%
Czechoslovakia	Руська національно-автономна партія	1935	0.4%
Danzig	Nationalsozialistische Deutsche Arbeiterpartei	1933	50.1%
Denmark	Bondepartiet	1939	3.0%
Denmark	Danmarks Nationalsocialistiske Arbejderparti	1939	1.8%
Denmark	Nationalt Samvirke	1939	1.0%
Denmark	Schleswigsche Partei	1939	0.9% (Note: 15.9% in Northern Schleswig.)
Denmark	Dansk Samling	1939	0.5%
Estonia	Eesti Vabadussõjalaste Liit	1934	>40%
Finland	Isänmaallinen kansanliike	1937	8.3%
(Weimar Republic) Germany	Nationalsozialistische Deutsche Arbeiterpartei	1932	37.0%
(Kingdom of Greece) Greece	Γενική Λαϊκή Ριζοσπαστική Ένωσις	1936	19.9%
(Kingdom of Greece) Greece	Κόμμα των Ελευθεροφρόνων	1936	3.9%
(Kingdom of Greece) Greece	Μεταρρυθμιστικό Εθνικό Κόμμα	1936	1.4%
(Kingdom of Greece) Greece	Εθνική Ένωσις Ελλάδος	1936	0.0%
(Kingdom of Hungary (1920–1946)) Hungary	Nyilaskeresztes Párt	1939	14.4%
(Kingdom of Hungary (1920–1946)) Hungary	Keresztény Nemzeti Szocialista Front	1939	2.4%
(Kingdom of Hungary (1920–1946)) Hungary	Egyesült Magyar Nemzeti Szocialista Párt	1939	2.1%
(Kingdom of Hungary (1920–1946)) Hungary	Nemzeti Front	1939	1.7%
(Kingdom of Hungary (1920–1946)) Hungary	Magyar Nemzeti Szocialista Földmunkás és Munkáspárt	1939	1.0%
(Kingdom of Hungary (1920–1946)) Hungary	Magyar Nemzeti Szocialista Párt	1939	0.3%
(Kingdom of Hungary (1920–1946)) Hungary	Népakarat Párt	1939	0.2%
(Kingdom of Hungary (1920–1946)) Hungary	Magyar Fajvédő Párt	1939	0.0%
(Kingdom of Hungary (1920–1946)) Hungary	Independents	1939	3.0%
(Kingdom of Iceland) Iceland	Flokkur Þjóðernissinna	1934	0.7%
Ireland	Irish Monetary Reform Association	1944	0.8%
Ireland	Ailtirí na hAiséirghe	1944	0.5%
(Kingdom of Italy) Italy	Fasci Italiani di Combattimento	1921	6.4%
Latvia	Kristīgā nacionālā savienība	1922	4.2%
Latvia	Bezpartijiskais nacionālais centrs	1922	3.7%
Netherlands	Nationaal-Socialistische Beweging in Nederland	1937	4.2%
Netherlands	Zwart Front	1937	0.2%
Netherlands	Verbond voor Nationaal Herstel	1937	0.2%
Netherlands	Nationaal-Socialistische Nederlandsche Arbeiderspartij	1937	0.0%
Norway	Nasjonal Samling	1933	2.2%
Romania	Legiunea Arhanghelul Mihail	1937	15.5% (Note: Elections were partially manipulated; some authors speculate that actual support for the party reached 25%.)
Romania	Partidul Național Creștin	1937	9.3%
(Saar Protectorate) Saar Basin	Nationalsozialistische Arbeiterpartei	1932	6.7%
(Second Spanish Republic) Spain	Falange Española y de las JONS	1936	0.1%
Sweden	Sveriges Nationella Förbund	1936	0.9%
Sweden	Nationalsocialistiska Arbetarepartiet	1936	0.6%
Sweden	Svenska nationalsocialistiska partiet	1936	0.1%
Switzerland	Nationale Front	1935	1.5%
Switzerland	Union nationale	1935	0.3%
Switzerland	Action hélvétique	1935	0.1%
Switzerland	Nouvel ordre politique national	1935	0.0%
United Kingdom	New Party	1931	0.2%
(Kingdom of Yugoslavia) Yugoslavia	Југословенски народни покрет „Збор"	1938	1.0%

== Early relationship ==
Mussolini and Adolf Hitler were not always allies. While Mussolini wanted the expansion of fascist ideology throughout the world, he did not initially appreciate Hitler and the Nazi Party. Hitler was an early admirer of Mussolini and asked for Mussolini's guidance on how the Nazis could pull off their own March on Rome. Mussolini did not respond to Hitler's requests as he did not have much interest in Hitler's movement and regarded Hitler to be somewhat crazy. Mussolini did attempt to read Mein Kampf to find out what Hitler's Nazism was, but he was immediately disappointed, saying that Mein Kampf was "a boring tome that I have never been able to read" and claimed that Hitler's beliefs were "little more than commonplace clichés".

Hitler and the Nazi Party in 1922 had praised the rise to power of Mussolini and sought a German-Italian alliance. Upon Mussolini's rise to power, the Nazis declared their admiration and emulation of the Italian Fascists, with Nazi member Hermann Esser in November 1922 saying that "what a group of brave men in Italy have done, we can also do in Bavaria. We've also got Italy's Mussolini: his name is Adolf Hitler".

The second part of Hitler's Mein Kampf ("The National Socialist Movement", 1926) contains this passage:

I conceived the profoundest admiration for the great man south of the Alps, who, full of ardent love for his people, made no pacts with the enemies of Italy, but strove for their annihilation by all ways and means. What will rank Mussolini among the great men of this earth is his determination not to share Italy with the Marxists, but to destroy internationalism and save the fatherland from it.

— Adolf Hitler, Mein Kampf, p. 622

In a 1931 interview, Hitler spoke admirably about Mussolini, commending Mussolini's racial origins as being the same as that of Germans and claimed at the time that Mussolini was capable of building an Italian Empire that would outdo the Roman Empire and that he supported Mussolini's endeavors, saying:

They know that Benito Mussolini is constructing a colossal empire which will put the Roman Empire in the shade. We shall put up ... for his victories. Mussolini is a typical representative of our Alpine race...

— Adolf Hitler, 1931.

Mussolini had personal reasons to oppose antisemitism as his longtime mistress and Fascist propaganda director Margherita Sarfatti was Jewish. She had played an important role in the foundation of the fascist movement in Italy and promoting it to Italians and the world through supporting the arts. However, within the Italian fascist movement there were a minority who endorsed Hitler's antisemitism as Roberto Farinacci, who was part of the far-right wing of the party.

There were also nationalist reasons why Germany and Italy were not immediate allies. Habsburg Austria (Hitler's birthplace) had an antagonistic relationship with Italy since it was formed, largely because Austria-Hungary had seized most of the territories once belonging to Italian states such as Venice. Italian irredentist claims sought the return of these lands to Italian rule (Italia irredenta). Although initially neutral, Italy entered World War I on the side of the Allies against Germany and Austria-Hungary when promised several territories (Trentino-Alto Adige/Südtirol, Trieste, Istria and Dalmatia). After the war had ended, Italy was rewarded with these territories under the terms of the 1919 Treaty of Saint-Germain-en-Laye.

In Germany and Austria, the annexation of Alto Adige/South Tyrol was controversial as the province was made up of a large majority of German speakers. While Hitler did not pursue this claim, many in the Nazi Party felt differently. In 1939, Mussolini and Hitler agreed on the South Tyrol Option Agreement. When Mussolini's government collapsed in 1943 and the Italian Social Republic was created, Alto Adige/South Tyrol was annexed to Nazi Greater Germany, but was restored to Italy after the war.

== Racism ==
The most striking difference between fascist ideologies is the racialist ideology which was the central priority of Nazism, but was not a priority of the other fascist ideologies. Fascism was founded on the principle of nationalist unity which opposed the divisionist class war ideologies of Marxist socialism and communism; therefore, the majority of the regimes viewed racialism as counterproductive to unity, with Mussolini asserting: that "National pride has no need of the delirium of race". Nazism differed from Italian fascism in that it had a stronger emphasis on race in terms of social and economic policies. Though both ideologies denied the significance of the individual, Italian fascism saw the individual as subservient to the state whereas Nazism saw the individual as well as the state as ultimately subservient to the race. However, subservience to the Nazi state was also a requirement on the population. Mussolini's fascism held that cultural factors existed to serve the state and that it was not necessarily in the state's interest to interfere in cultural aspects of society. The only purpose of government in Mussolini's fascism was to uphold the state as supreme above all else, a concept which can be described as statolatry.

Unlike Hitler, Mussolini repeatedly changed his views on the issue of race according to the circumstances of the time. In 1921, Mussolini promoted the development of the Italian race such as when he said this:

The nation is not simply the sum of living individuals, nor the instrument of parties for their own ends, but an organism comprised of the infinite series of generations of which the individuals are only transient elements; it is the supreme synthesis of all the material and immaterial values of the race.

— Benito Mussolini, 1921

Like Hitler, Mussolini publicly declared his support of a eugenics policy to improve the status of Italians in 1926 to the people of Reggio Emilia:

We need to create ourselves; we of this epoch and this generation, because it is up to us, I tell you, to make the face of this country unrecognizable in the next ten years. In ten years comrades, Italy will be unrecognizable! We will create a new Italian, an Italian that does not recognize the Italian of yesterday...we will create them according to our own imagination and likeness.

— Benito Mussolini, 1926

In a 1921 speech in Bologna, Mussolini stated the following: "Fascism was born [...] out of a profound, perennial need of this our Aryan and Mediterranean race". In this speech, Mussolini was referring to Italians as being the Mediterranean branch of the Aryan race, Aryan in the meaning of people of an Indo-European language and culture. However, Italian fascism initially strongly rejected the common Nordicist conception of the Aryan race that idealized "pure" Aryans as having certain physical traits that were defined as Nordic such as blond hair and blue eyes. The antipathy by Mussolini and other Italian fascists to Nordicism was over the existence of the Mediterranean inferiority complex that had been instilled into Mediterraneans by the propagation of such theories by German and Anglo-Saxon Nordicists who viewed Mediterranean peoples as racially degenerate and thus inferior. Mussolini refused to allow Italy to return again to this inferiority complex.

In a private conversation with Emil Ludwig in 1932, Mussolini derided the concept of a biologically superior race and denounced racism as being a foolish concept. Mussolini did not believe that race alone was that significant. Mussolini viewed himself as a modern-day Roman Emperor, the Italians as a cultural elite and he also wished to "Italianise" the parts of the Italian Empire which he had desired to build. A cultural superiority of Italians, rather than a view of racialism. Mussolini believed that the development of a race was insignificant in comparison to the development of a culture, but he did believe that a race could be improved through moral development, though he did not say that this would make a superior race:

Race! It is a feeling, not a reality: ninety-five percent, at least, is a feeling. Nothing will ever make me believe that biologically pure races can be shown to exist today. [...] National pride has no need of the delirium of race. Only a revolution and a decisive leader can improve a race, even if this is more a sentiment than a reality. But I repeat that a race can change itself and improve itself. I say that it is possible to change not only the somatic lines, the height, but really also the character. Influence of moral pressure can act deterministically also in the biological sense.

— Benito Mussolini, 1932.;

Mussolini believed that a biologically superior race was not possible, but that a more developed culture's superiority over the less developed ones warranted the destruction of the latter, such as the culture of Ethiopia and the neighboring Slavic cultures, such as those in Slovenia and Croatia. He took advantage of the fact that no undertaking was made with regard to the rights of minorities (such as those that lived in Istria and Trieste's surroundings) in either the Treaty of Rapallo or the Treaty of Rome; and after 1924's Treaty of Rome these same treaties did not make any undertaking with regard to the rights of the minorities that lived in Rijeka. Croatian, Slovene, German and French toponyms were systematically Italianized.

Against ethnic Slovenes, he imposed an especially violent fascist Italianization policy. To Italianize ethnic Slovene and Croatian children, Fascist Italy brought Italian teachers from Southern Italy to the ex Austro-Hungarian territories that had been given to Italy in exchange for its decision to join Great Britain in World War I such as Slovene Littoral and a big part of western Slovenia while Slovene and Croatian teachers, poets, writers, artists, and clergy were exiled to Sardinia and Southern Italy. Acts of fascist violence were not hampered by the authorities, such as the burning down of the Narodni dom (Community Hall of ethnic Slovenes) in Trieste, which was carried out at night by fascists with the connivance of the police on 13 July 1920.

After the complete destruction of all Slovene minority cultural, financial, and other organizations and the continuation of violent fascist Italianization policies of ethnic cleansing, one of the first anti-fascist organizations in Europe, TIGR, emerged in 1927, and it coordinated the Slovene resistance against Fascist Italy until it was dismantled by the fascist secret police in 1941, after which some ex-TIGR members joined the Slovene Partisans.

For Mussolini, the inclusion of people in a fascist society depended upon their loyalty to the state. Meetings between Mussolini and Arab dignitaries from the colony of Libya convinced him that the Arab population was worthy enough to be given extensive civil rights and as a result, he allowed Muslims to join a Muslim section of the Fascist Party, namely the Muslim Association of the Lictor. However, under pressure from Nazi Germany, the fascist regime eventually embraced a racist ideology, such as promoting the belief that Italy was settling Africa in order to create a white civilization there and it imposed five-year prison sentences on any Italians who were caught having sexual or marital relationships with native Africans. Against those colonial peoples who were not loyal, vicious campaigns of repression were waged such as in Ethiopia, where native Ethiopian settlements were burned to the ground by the Italian armed forces in 1937. Under fascism, native Africans were allowed to join the Italian armed forces as colonial troops and they also appeared in fascist propaganda.

At least in its overt ideology, the Nazi movement believed that the existence of a class-based society was a threat to its survival, and as a result, it wanted to unify the racial element above the established classes, but the Italian fascist movement sought to preserve the class system and uphold it as the foundation of an established and desirable culture. Nevertheless, the Italian fascists did not reject the concept of social mobility and a central tenet of the fascist state was meritocracy, yet fascism also heavily based itself on corporatism, which was supposed to supersede class conflicts. Despite these differences, Kevin Passmore (2002 p. 62) observes:

There are sufficient similarities between Fascism and Nazism to make it worthwhile by applying the concept of fascism to both. In Italy and Germany, a movement came to power that sought to create national unity through the repression of national enemies and the incorporation of all classes and both genders into a permanently mobilized nation.

Nazi ideologues such as Alfred Rosenberg were highly skeptical of the Italian race and fascism, but he believed that the improvement of the Italian race was possible if major changes were made to convert it into an acceptable "Aryan" race and he also said that the Italian fascist movement would only succeed if it purified the Italian race into an Aryan one. Nazi theorists believed that the downfall of the Roman Empire was due to the interbreeding of different races which created a "polluted" Italian race that was inferior.

Hitler believed this and he also believed that Mussolini represented an attempt to revive the pure elements of the former Roman civilization, such as the desire to create a strong and aggressive Italian people. However, Hitler was still audacious enough when meeting Mussolini for the first time in 1934 to tell him that all Mediterranean peoples were "tainted" by "Negro blood" and thus in his racist view they were degenerate.

Relations between Fascist Italy and Nazi Germany were initially poor but they deteriorated even further after the assassination of Austria's fascist chancellor Engelbert Dollfuss by Austrian Nazis in 1934. Under Dollfuss Austria was a key ally of Mussolini and Mussolini was deeply angered by Hitler's attempt to take over Austria and he expressed it by angrily mocking Hitler's earlier remark on the impurity of the Italian race by declaring that a "Germanic" race did not exist and he also indicated that Hitler's repression of Germany's Jews proved that the Germans were not a pure race:

But which race? Does there exist a German race. Has it ever existed? Will it ever exist? Reality, myth, or hoax of theorists? (Another parenthesis: the theoretician of racism is a 100 percent Frenchman: Gobineau) Ah well, we respond, a Germanic race does not exist. Various movements. Curiosity. Stupor. We repeat. Does not exist. We don't say so. Scientists say so. Hitler says so.

— Benito Mussolini, 1934

== Foreign affairs ==
Italian Fascism was expansionist in its desires, it advocated the establishment of a New Roman Empire. Nazi Germany was even more aggressive in expanding its borders in violation of the 1919 Treaty of Versailles. The Nazis murdered the Austrofascist dictator Dollfuss, causing an uneasy relationship in Austria between fascism and Nazism at an early stage. Italian nationalist and pan-German claims clashed over the issue of Tyrol.

In the 1920s, Hitler, with only a small Nazi party at the time, wanted to form an alliance with Mussolini's regime because he recognized the fact that his espousal of pan-German nationalism was seen as a threat by Italy. In his unpublished sequel to Mein Kampf, Hitler attempted to address concerns about Nazism which were widespread among Italian fascists. In the book, Hitler puts the issue of Germans in Tyrol aside by stating that overall, Germany and Italy have more in common than not and as a result, the Tyrol Germans must accept the fact that it is in Germany's interests for Germany to be allied with Italy. Hitler claims that Germany, like Italy, was subjected to oppression by its neighbours and he denounces the Austrian Empire by stating that it oppressed Italy by preventing it from completing its national unification just as France oppressed Germany by preventing it from completing its national unification. In the book, Hitler's denunciation of Austria is important because Italian fascists were skeptical of him due to the fact that he was born in Austria, which Italy had considered its primary enemy for centuries and Italy believed that Germany was an ally of Austria. By declaring that the Nazi movement was not interested in the territorial legacy of the Austrian Empire, the Nazi Party was able to assure the Italian fascists that Hitler, the Nazi movement and Germany were not enemies of Italy.

Despite Hitler's public attempts to display goodwill towards Mussolini, Germany and Italy came into conflict in 1934 when Engelbert Dollfuss, the Austrofascist leader of Italy's ally Austria, was assassinated by Austrian Nazis on Hitler's orders in preparation for a planned Anschluss (annexation of Austria). Mussolini ordered troops to the Austrian-Italian border in readiness for a war against Germany. Hitler backed down by deferring his plans to annex Austria.

When Hitler and Mussolini first met, Mussolini referred to Hitler as "a silly little monkey" before the Allies forced Mussolini to form an alliance with Hitler. Mussolini also reportedly asked Pope Pius XII to excommunicate Hitler. From 1934 to 1936, Hitler continually attempted to win the support of Italy and the Nazi regime endorsed the Italian invasion of Ethiopia (leading to Ethiopia's annexation as Italian East Africa) while the League of Nations condemned Italian aggression. With other countries opposing Italy, the fascist regime had no choice but to draw closer to Nazi Germany. Germany joined Italy by supporting the Nationalists under Francisco Franco with forces and supplies during the Spanish Civil War.

Later, Germany and Italy signed the Anti-Comintern Pact which obligated the two regimes to oppose the Comintern and Soviet communism. By 1938, Mussolini allowed Hitler to carry out the Anschluss in exchange for an official German renunciation of claims to Tyrol. Mussolini supported the annexation of the Sudetenland during the Munich Agreement talks later that year.

In 1939, the Pact of Steel was signed, officially solidifying an alliance between Germany and Italy. The official Nazi newspaper Völkischer Beobachter contained articles which extolled the mutually beneficial results of the alliance:

Firmly bound together through the inner unity of their ideologies and the comprehensive solidarity of their interests, the German and the Italian people are determined also in future to stand side by side and to strive with united effort for the securing of their Lebensraum [living space] and the maintenance of peace.

— Völkischer Beobachter (May 23, 1939)

Hitler and Mussolini recognized the fact that there were commonalities in their politics and the second part of Hitler's Mein Kampf ("The National Socialist Movement", 1926) contains this passage:

I conceived the profoundest admiration for the great man south of the Alps, who, full of ardent love for his people, made no pacts with the enemies of Italy, but strove for their annihilation by all ways and means. What will rank Mussolini among the great men of this earth is his determination not to share Italy with the Marxists, but to destroy internationalism and save the fatherland from it.

— Mein Kampf (p. 622)

Both regimes despised France (seen as an enemy which held territories claimed by both Germany and Italy) and Yugoslavia (seen by the Nazis as a racially degenerate Slavic state and holding lands such as Dalmatia claimed by the Italian fascists). Fascist territorial claims on Yugoslav territory meant that Mussolini saw the destruction of Yugoslavia as essential for Italian expansion. Hitler viewed Slavs as racially inferior, but he did not see importance in an immediate invasion of Yugoslavia, instead focusing on the threat from the Soviet Union.

Mussolini favored using the extremist Croatian nationalist Ustaše as a useful tool to tear down the Serbian-ruled Yugoslavia. In 1941, the Italian military campaign in Greece (the Greco-Italian War, called the Battle of Greece for the period after the German intervention) was failing. Hitler reluctantly began the Balkan Campaign with the invasion of Yugoslavia. German, Italian, Bulgarian, Hungarian and Croatian insurgents (under the Axis puppet Independent State of Croatia) decisively defeated Yugoslavia.

In the aftermath, with the exception of Serbia and Vardar Macedonia, most of Yugoslavia was reshaped based on Italian fascist foreign policy objectives. Mussolini demanded and received much of Dalmatia from the Croats in exchange for supporting the independence of Croatia. Mussolini's policy of creating an independent Croatia prevailed over Hitler's anti-Slavism and eventually, the Nazis and the Ustashe regime of Croatia would develop closer bonds due to the Ustashe's brutal effectiveness at suppressing Serb dissidents.

The question of religion also poses considerable conflicting differences as some forms of fascism, particularly the Fatherland Front and National Union that were devoutly Catholic. The occultist and pagan elements of Nazi ideology were very hostile to the traditional Christianity found in the vast majority of fascist movements of the 20th century.

== See also ==
- Anti-fascism
- Post–World War II anti-fascism
- Anti-racism
- Antisemitism by country#Europe
  - Antisemitism in Europe
- Clerical fascism
  - Christian fascism
  - Hindutva
  - Islamofascism
- White jihad
- Crypto-fascism
- Definitions of fascism
  - Fascism and ideology
    - History of fascism (pre-1922)
- History of fascism (1922–1945)
- History of fascism (1945–present)
- Far-right politics
  - Far-right subcultures
- Fascism in Asia
- Fascism in North America
  - Fascism in Canada
  - Fascism in the United States
- Fascism in South America
- Nazism in the Americas
- List of Falangist movements
- List of fascist movements
  - List of fascist movements by country
- List of Ku Klux Klan organizations
- List of neo-Nazi organizations
- List of organizations designated by the SPLC as hate groups
- List of white nationalist organizations
- Political parties whose policies involve antisemitism
- Opposition to antisemitism
- Para-fascism
- Proto-fascism
- Racism in Europe
- Radical right in Europe
- Radicalism in the United States
  - Radical right in the United States
- Right-wing terrorism#Europe
