= Ferenc Rajniss =

Hungarian journalist and politician

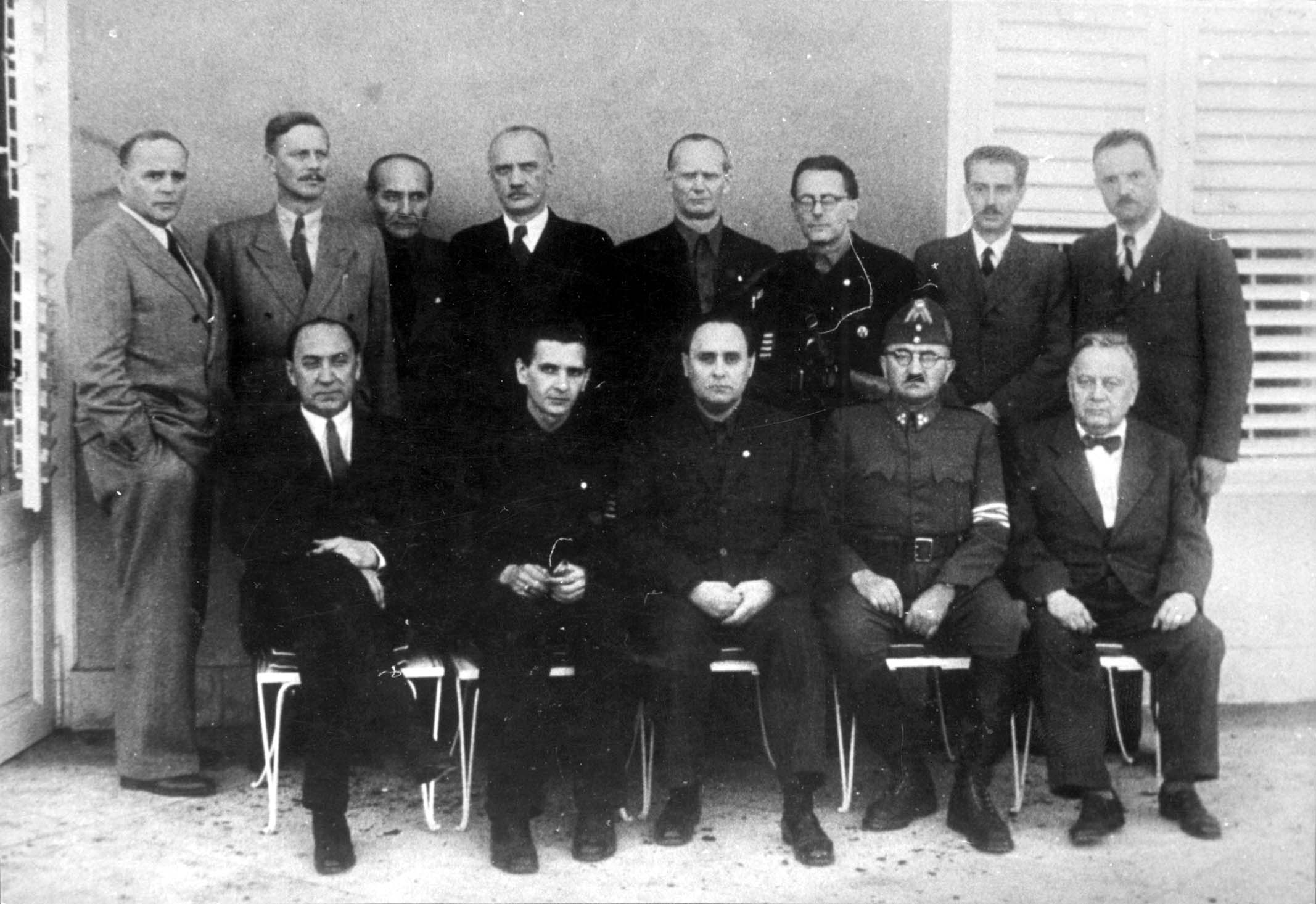
- Ministers of the Arrow Cross Party government. Ferenc Rajniss is in the first from left of the upper row.
- Born: Ferenc Rheinisch; 24 July 1893; Bártfa, Sáros County, Austria-Hungary
- Died: 12 March 1946 (aged 52); Budapest, Hungary
- Cause of death: Execution by firing squad
- Citizenship: Hungarian
- Occupation: Journalist
- Known for: Politician and Nazi collaborator
- Title: Minister of Education
- Term: 1944–1945
- Political party: Hungarian National Defence Association, Reform Generation, National Front, Party of Hungarian Life, Party of Hungarian Renewal, National Federation

Ferenc Rajniss (born Rheinisch) (24 July 1893 – 12 March 1946) was a Hungarian journalist, socialite and fascist politician. He held pro-Nazi Germany views in Hungarian politics.

== Emergence ==
Born in Bártfa, Kingdom of Hungary, Austria-Hungary (now Bardejov, Slovakia) to a Zipser family, Rajniss's surname initially reflected his German origins before he Hungarianized it. As a journalist Rajniss belonged to the Szeged fascist camp and was a supporter of Gyula Gömbös. He founded his own weekly paper, Magyar Futár, in support of this movement and it soon became notorious for its anti-Semitism. Before long he had secured funding from Nazi Germany for his political endeavours and this was to be one of his two main sources of income, the other being acting as a 'toy boy' to a number of wealthy old women.

== Member of the Diet ==
Rajniss was elected to the Diet of Hungary in the early 1930s, initially as a representative of the minor far right National Front. However he left this group in October 1937 to join with Zoltán Böszörmény and Fidél Pálffy in launching the United Hungarian National Socialist Party, one of a number of largely failed attempts to bring Hungary's Nazis under one umbrella.

Rajniss then became a supporter of Béla Imrédy and in 1938 joined the governing party as a result of his change of position. He followed his leader into the Party of National Renewal when Imrédy founded this opposition group in 1940.

== Nazism ==
Rajniss launched a second paper, Esti Ujság, which he continued to edit until 1944 and which offered a pro-Nazi agenda. He became a trusted ally of the Nazis and specifically collaborated closely with the RSHA. By this time Rajniss had again switched his support, this time to Ferenc Szálasi (although he never sympathized with Szálasi's ideology and considered the retired army officer as a "fanatic" and "finicking") and in 1944 he was one of the leaders of the "Nemzeti Szövetség" (National Federation) parliamentary group, which contained about 200 members of Parliament committed to continuing the war on the side of the Nazis. Rajniss played a leading role in Szálasi's rise to power and was appointed part of the three-man governing council with which the Germans replaced Miklós Horthy in 1944, alongside Károly Beregfy and Sándor Csia. He was also appointed Minister of Religion and Education in the new government, a position he held until his resignation on 7 March 1945, following emerging tensions between Szálasi and him.

Arrested after the collapse of the government he was judged as a leading figure in collaborationism and was executed by firing squad in Budapest.

Political offices
Preceded by Iván Rakovszky	Minister of Religion and Education; 1944–1945	Succeeded by Ferenc Szálasi
