= Hungarian nationalism =

Flag of Hungary

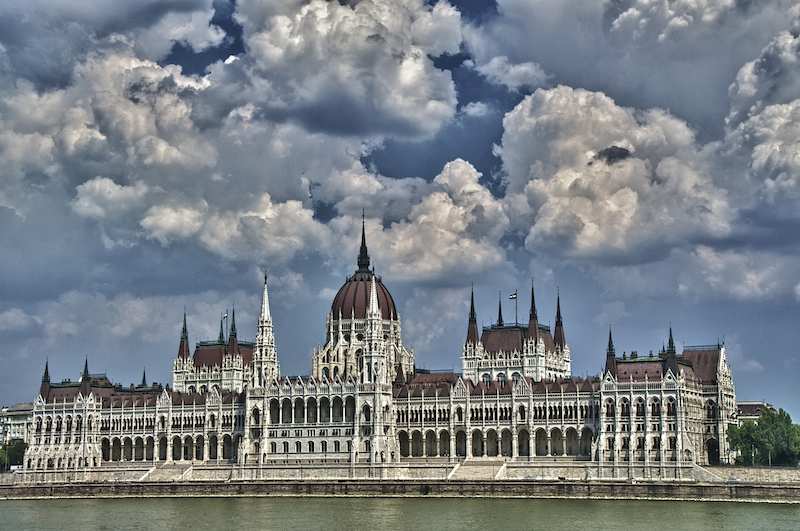
Hungarian Parliament Building.

Hungarian nationalism (Hungarian: magyar nacionalizmus) developed in the late 18th century and early 19th century along the classic lines of scholarly interest leading to political nationalism and mass participation. In the 1790s, Hungarian nobles pushed for the adoption of Hungarian as the official language rather than Latin. This conflicted with Holy Roman Emperor Joseph II's declaration of German as the administrative language. The lower Hungarian nobility launched a literary renaissance of the Hungarian language and culture, often questioning the loyalty of the magnates, less than half of whom were ethnic Hungarians, and many of these had become French- and German-speaking courtiers. Following the successful revival of the Hungarian language in the first half of the 19th century, and the suppressed Hungarian Revolution of 1848, the Austro-Hungarian Compromise of 1867 finally elevated the status of the Hungarian nation to equality with Austria.

== Parties ==
=== Current ===
- Fidesz
- Jobbik (2003–2020)
- Our Homeland Movement (2018–present)

=== Former (After 1989: End of communism in Hungary) ===
- People of the Orient Party – Christian Democrats (1989–1998)
- Party of the Hungarian Interest (1993–2005)
- Hungarian Justice and Life Party (1993–2021) (merged with Our Homeland Movement)

=== Former (before 1945) ===
- Unity Party (1922–1944)
- Hungarian National Independence Party (1923–1928)
- Hungarian National Socialist Agricultural Labourers' and Workers' Party (1932–1945)
- Arrow Cross Party (1935–1945)
- Christian National Socialist Front (1937–1940)
- United Hungarian National Socialist Party (1936–1940)
- National Front (1936–1939)

== Movements ==
- Magyar Gárda (2007–2009), see also Magyar Nemzeti Gárda
- Force and Determination (2017–present)
- Sixty-Four Counties Youth Movement (2001–present)
- Pax Hungarica Movement (2008–2017)
- Hungarian National Defence Association or "Véderő" (2007–2011)
- Hungarian National Front (1989–2016)
- Civil Guard Association for a Better Future (2011–2014)
- Magyar Önvédelmi Mozgalom (2014–present)
- Magyar Nemzeti Gárda (2010–present)
- Betyársereg
- Legio Hungaria

== See also ==
- Doctrine of the Holy Crown
- Hungarian irredentism
- Hungarian Revolution of 1848
- Hungarian Turanism
- Magyarization
- National symbols of Hungary
- National conservatism
- Right-wing populism
- Trianon Syndrome
- Magyar Sziget
