= Szeged Idea =

Proto-fascist ideology from 1919 Hungary

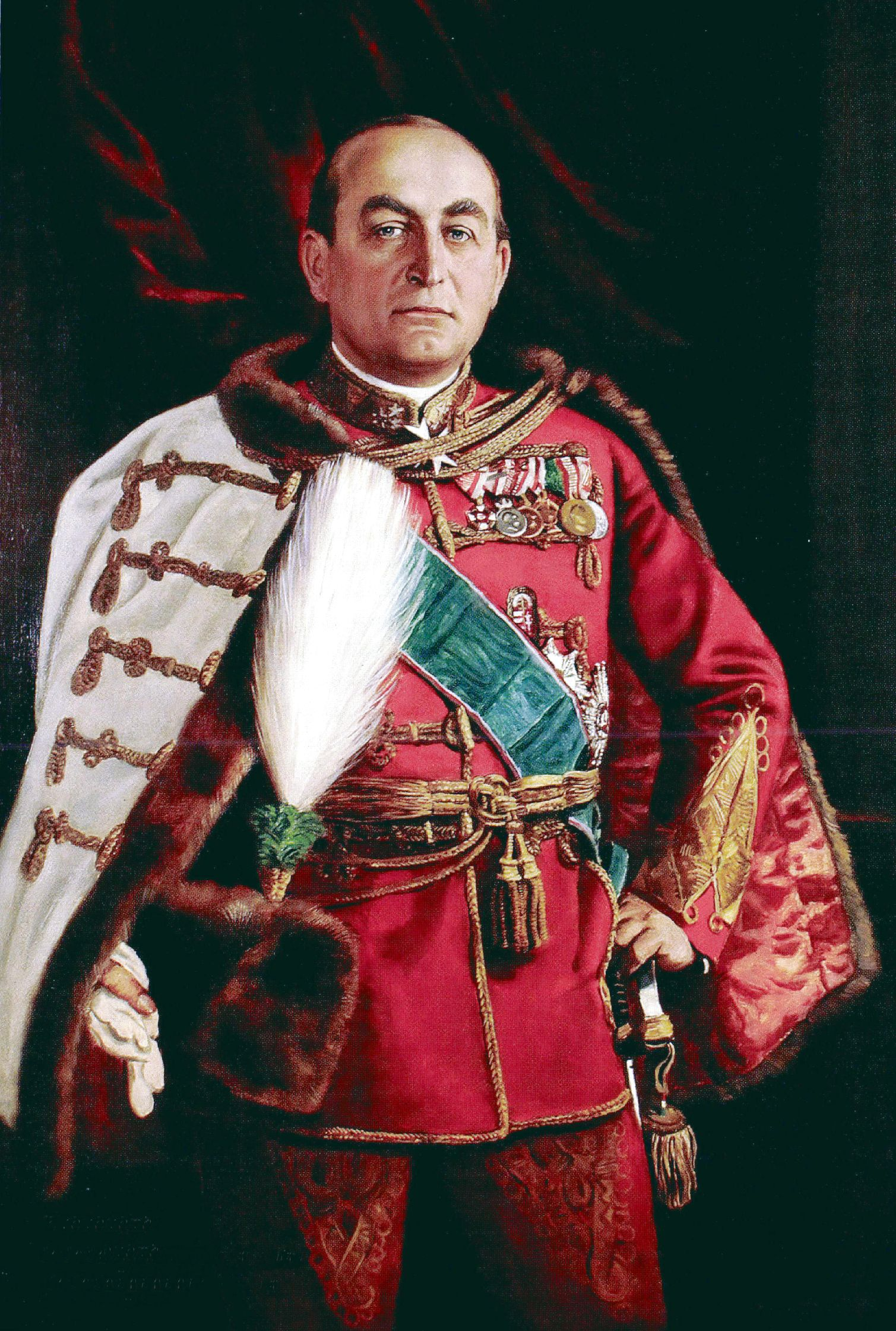
Portrait of Gyula Gömbös from the 1930s

Flag of the Unity Party in Hungary during Gömbös' leadership.

The Szeged Idea (Hungarian: Szegedi gondolat [ˈsɛɡɛdi ˈɡondolɒt]), also informally known as Szeged fascism, refers to the ideology that developed among anti-communist counter-revolutionaries in Szeged, Hungary, in 1919 as initially a proto-fascism and later developed into an ideology resembling Nazism. The Szeged Idea was based upon the claim that Hungary was stabbed in the back in World War I by communists and Jews and promoted action to undo this evil by declaring holy war against such traitors. Szeged militants promoted Hungarian nationalism, an economic "third way", and advocated a "strong" state.

Szegedists promoted irredentist claims to territories belonging to Hungary prior to the end of World War I. The ideology claimed the existence of a "Judeo-Bolshevik" conspiracy in Hungary. The principal leader of the Szegedists was Gyula Gömbös. Gömbös declared violence to be "an acceptable means of statecraft... to shape the course of history, not in the interest of a narrow clique, but of an entire nation". Upon being appointed Prime Minister, Gömbös and his Unity Party adopted fascist positions, including the promotion of corporatist solutions to national unity like that of Benito Mussolini and a racial policy like that of Adolf Hitler.

Gömbös declared that his government would "secure our national civilization based upon our own special racial peculiarities and upon Christian moral principles".

== See also ==
- Gyula Gömbös
- Hungarian National Defence Association
- Unity Party (Hungary)
