= National Socialist Hungarian Workers' Party =

The National Socialist Hungarian Workers' Party (Hungarian: Nemzeti Szocialista Magyar Munkáspárt [ˈnɛmzɛti ˈsot͡sijɒliʃtɒ ˈmɒɟɒr ˈmuŋkaːʃpaːrt], NSZMP) was a Nazi party, founded by Zoltán Böszörmény with the intention of emulating the NSDAP, and active between 2 May 1932 and 3 June 1936.

== History ==
The NSZMP was the first Hungarian Nazi party to win popular support. Its founders had already started political adventures around 1930-1931, but it was not until the end of 1931 that they began to gain public attention. Finally in May 1932 they officially organized a party, however these Hungarian National Socialists limited their activities almost exclusively to Tiszántúl, being practically non-existent at that time outside that region. After Interior Minister Ferenc Keresztes-Fischer decided to ban the swastika in Hungary in September 1933, the NSZMP was forced to change its symbol, adopting a skull along with two intersecting scythes taking on a swastika-like shape.

At the end of 1933, a conflict between the leaders of the party led to the Debrecen branch announcing its separation and the creation of its own Hungarian National Socialist party under the leadership of Gyula Svaszta and Vilmos Szedlár. After the Ministry of the Interior discovered in May 1936 that the Hungarian Nazis had in mind to organize a coup and that they were seeking sympathy among the military and the support of Germany, their main leaders were arrested. The Party was finally officially banned a few weeks later. Its leaders were sentenced to prison on 20 October 1937, and its members ended up in the ranks of other marginal radical parties.
