= Government of National Unity (Hungary) =

1944–1945 Nazi puppet government of Hungary

Coordinates: 47°26′N 19°15′E

Government of National Unity Nemzeti Összefogás Kormánya (Hungarian) Regierung der nationalen Einheit (German)
- 1944–1945
- Top: National flag Bottom: Party flag of the Arrow Cross Coat of arms
- Motto: Regnum Mariae Patrona Hungariae (Latin) ("Kingdom of Mary, the Patron of Hungary")
- Anthem: Himnusz (English: "Hymn") Ébredj Magyar (English: "Wake up, Hungarian!")
- Seal of Hungary (1945)

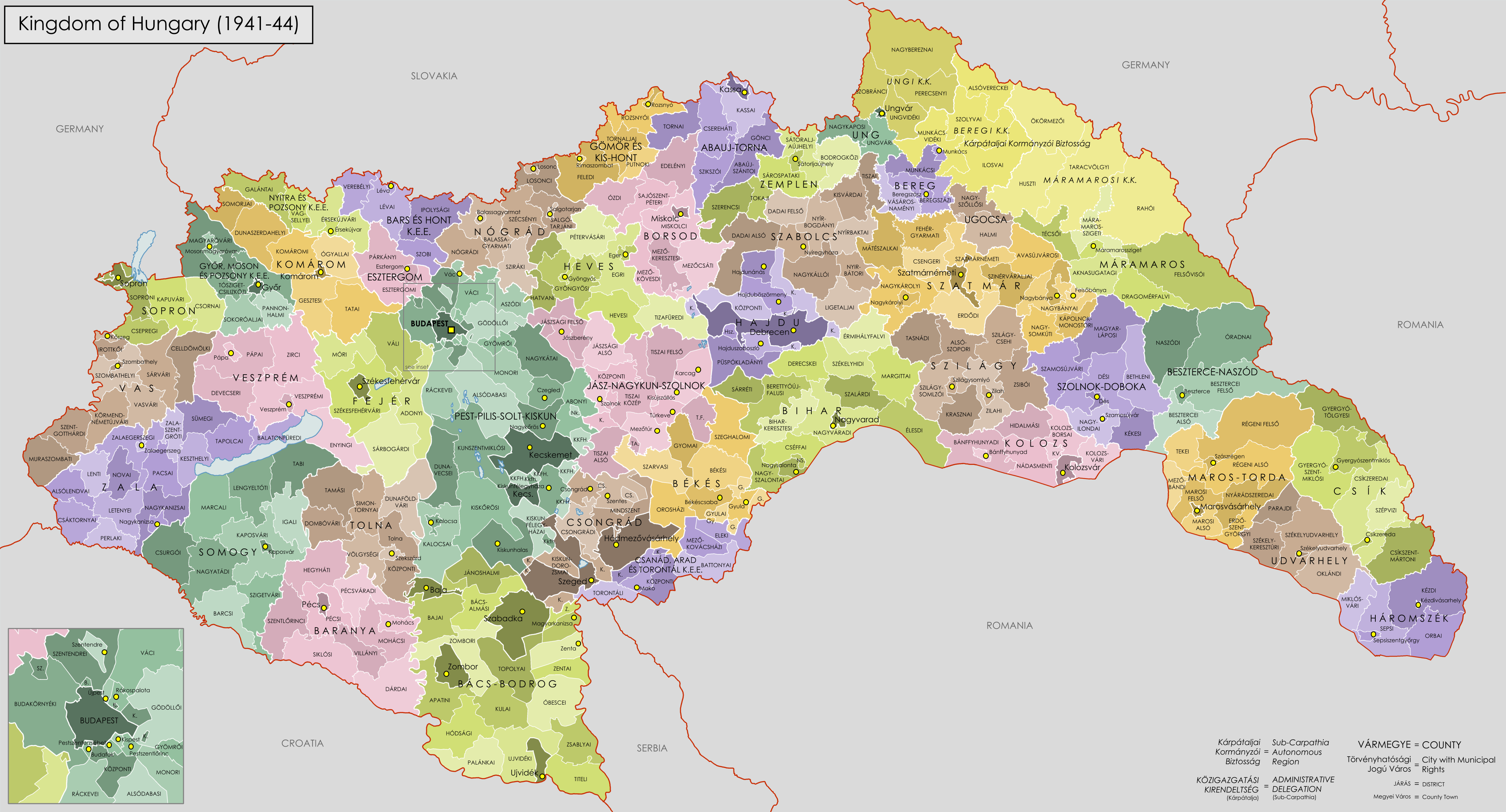
- Status: Puppet government of Nazi Germany
- Common languages: Hungarian
- Religion: Roman Catholic; Calvinism; Lutheranism; Eastern Orthodoxy; Eastern Catholicism
- Demonym: Hungarian
- Government: Fascist state under Nazi administration
- Leader of the Nation & Prime Minister
  - 1944–1945: Ferenc Szálasi
- Speaker of the House of Representatives
  - 1944–1945: András Tasnádi Nagy
- Legislature: Diet
- Historical era: World War II
  - Operation Panzerfaust: 15 October 1944
  - Government formed: 16 October 1944
  - Government fled to Germany: 28–29 March 1945
  - End of German occupation of Hungary: 4 April 1945
  - Capture of Szálasi: 6 May 1945
  - Disestablished: 7 May 1945
- Currency: Hungarian pengő
Preceded by	Succeeded by
Kingdom of Hungary	Kingdom of Hungary; Soviet occupation of Hungary
- Today part of: Hungary

The Government of National Unity was a Nazi-backed puppet government within the German-occupied Kingdom of Hungary during World War II in Eastern Europe. After the joint coup d’état with which the Nazis and the Arrow Cross Party overthrew the government of the Regent of Hungary, Miklós Horthy (r. 1920–1944), the Arrow Cross Party established the coalition Government of National Unity (Nemzeti Összefogás Kormánya) on 16 October 1944.

As the national government, the Arrow Cross Party installed Ferenc Szálasi as the prime minister of the Government of National Unity and as the Leader of the Nation, the head of state of Hungary. As a wartime ally of Nazi Germany, Prime Minister Szálasi's government readily executed and realised the Holocaust in Hungary (1941–1945); thus, in seven months, the Arrow Cross regime killed between 10,000 and 15,000 Hungarian Jews in the country, and deported 80,000 Jewish women, children, and old people for killing at the Auschwitz concentration camp.

== Background ==
Late in the Second World War, at the time of the joint coup d’état by which the German Nazis and the Arrow Cross Party overthrew the Regent of Hungary, Miklós Horthy (r. 1920–1944), the Red Army occupied most of the Kingdom of Hungary, which effectively limited the authority of the Government of National Unity to a narrowing band of territory around Budapest. Despite the Red Army's strategic limitation of Hungarian forces, as agreed with the Nazis, the Arrow Cross regime realised the Holocaust in Hungary with Prime Minister Ferenc Szálasi's resumption of the Nazis’ scheduled deportations of Hungarian Jews, especially the Jews of Budapest. In 1941, 800,000 Jews resided in the expanded borders of the Kingdom of Hungary; in 1945, only 200,000 Hungarian Jews had survived the Holocaust; moreover, PM Szálasi's deportation order also included the Romani genocide (Porajmos) of 28,000 Hungarian Roma people.

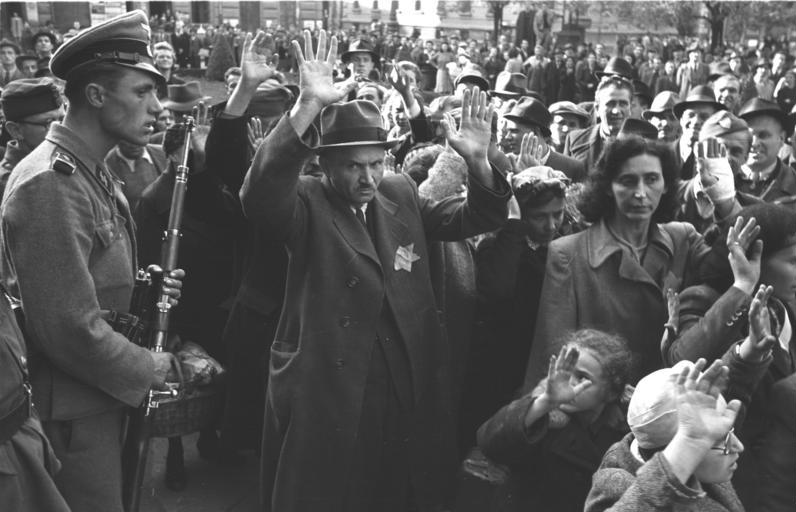
The Jews of Budapest are assembled for deportation to a Nazi a Holocaust Centre. (October 1944)

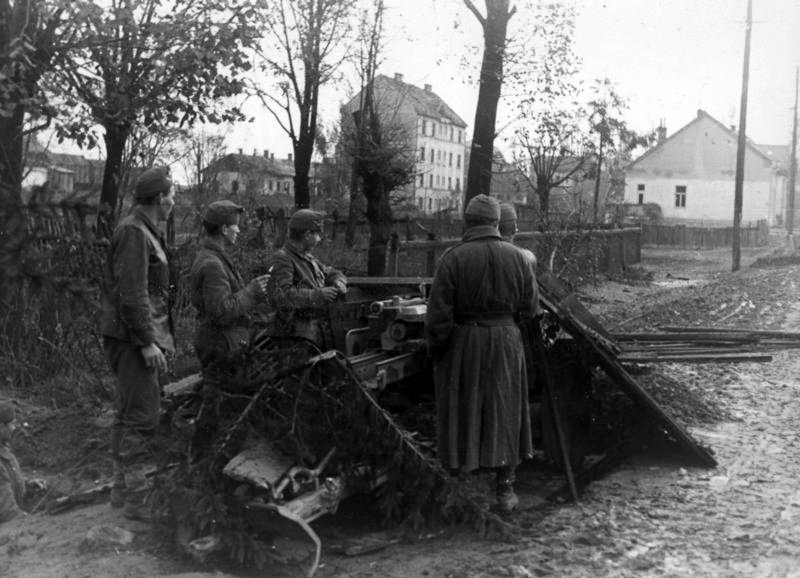
Hungarian soldiers operate a 7.5 cm Pak 40 anti-tank gun in a suburb of Budapest. (November 1944)

Prime Minister Szálasi established the "Corporate order of the Working nation" (Dolgozó Nemzet Hivatás Rendje) as the national economy for Hungary. Even as Hungary was in chaos, Szálasi refused theoretically to compromise Hungarian sovereignty, trying to retain nominal command of all Hungarian military units, including the local SS units. Ethnic Germans were still not allowed to join the Arrow Cross Party. Szálasi devoted much time to his political writings and to trips in the shrinking territory under his control: many political matters were effectively handled by his Deputy Prime Minister Jenő Szöllősi. At the beginning of December, Szálasi and his government relocated out of Budapest as Soviet troops advanced towards the capital. In a scorched earth strategy, the German armed forces destroyed Hungarian infrastructure as the Soviets closed in.

In December 1944, the Battle of Budapest began. Fascist forces loyal to Szálasi and the badly damaged remnants of the Hungarian First Army fought alongside German forces. They fought against the Red Army to no avail. By 13 February 1945, all of Budapest was under Soviet control.

In March 1945, during Operation Spring Awakening (Unternehmen Frühlingserwachen), Fascist Hungarian forces of the Hungarian Third Army fought alongside German forces in the last major offensive in Hungary against the Soviet forces. For ten days the Axis forces made costly gains. However, within twenty-four hours, the Soviet counterattack was able to drive the Germans and Hungarians back to the positions they held before the offensive began.

Between 16 March and 25 March 1945, the remnants of the Hungarian Third Army were overrun and virtually destroyed. By the end of March and into April, what remained of the Royal Hungarian Army were put on the defensive during the Nagykanizsa–Körmend Offensive and were then forced into Slovakia and Austria as Soviet forces occupied all of Hungary. Béla Miklós's government was nominally in control of the whole country. Nazi Germany itself was on the verge of collapse.

The Ferenc Szálasi regime, which had fled Hungary, was dissolved on 7 May 1945, a day before Germany's surrender. Szálasi was captured by American troops in Mattsee on 6 May and returned to Hungary, where he was tried for crimes against the state and executed, along with three of his ministers. Most of his ministers also were sentenced to death and executed, except four of them. Béla Jurcsek committed suicide at the end of the war, Árpád Henney fled to Austria. Emil Szakváry was sentenced to life imprisonment, while Vilmos Hellebronth was sentenced to death, but the tribunal – before execution – changed his sentence to life imprisonment.

== Hungary divided ==
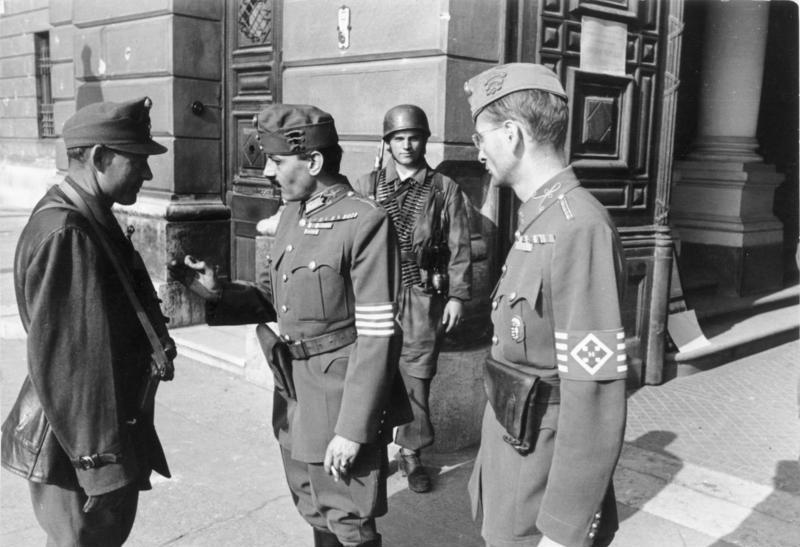
Hungarian officers in Budapest, October 1944

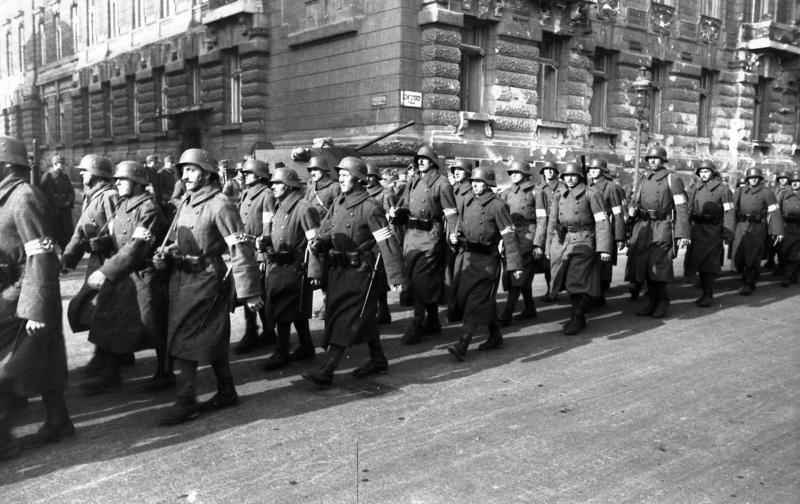
Arrow Cross members marching in Budapest, October 1944

After Miklós Horthy announced an armistice with the Allies on 15 October 1944, the Germans kidnapped him and threatened to kill his son unless he renounced the armistice and abdicated. To spare his son's life, Horthy signed a statement announcing both his abdication and the appointment of Arrow Cross leader Ferenc Szálasi as Magyar királyi miniszterelnök (Royal Hungarian Prime Minister) on 16 October. He was then deported to Germany. This act merely rubber-stamped an Arrow Cross coup, as Szálasi's men had taken over Budapest the previous night.

In his memoirs, Horthy later contended that he never gave power to the Arrow Cross, but had "merely exchanged my signature for my son's life." As he saw it, the appointment of Szálasi was void, since "a signature wrung from a man at machine-gun point can have little legality."

The Hungarian parliament approved the formation of a Council of Regency (Kormányzótanács) of three on 17 October. On 4 November, Szálasi was sworn as Leader of the Nation (nemzetvezető). He formed a government of sixteen ministers, half of which were members of the Arrow Cross Party. While the Horthy regency had come to an end, the Hungarian monarchy was not abolished by the Szálasi regime, as government newspapers kept referring to the country as the Kingdom of Hungary (Magyar Királyság, also abbreviated as m.kir.), although Magyarország (Hungary) was frequently used as an alternative.

Szálasi was an ardent fascist and his "Quisling government" had little other intention or ability but to maintain fascism and to maintain control in Nazi-occupied portions of Hungary as Soviet troops poured into Hungary. He did this in order to reduce the threat to Germany. Szálasi's aim was to create a dictatorial state based on his "Hungarist" ideology.

On 21 December 1944, with the approval of the Soviet Union, Béla Miklós was elected as the prime minister of a "counter" Hungarian government (National Provisional Government of Hungary) in Soviet-controlled Debrecen. Miklós was a former commander of the Hungarian First Army. He had failed in his efforts to convince many of the men under his command to switch sides. The government that Miklós oversaw was an "interim government" and maintained control in the Soviet-occupied portions of Hungary.

== Government ==
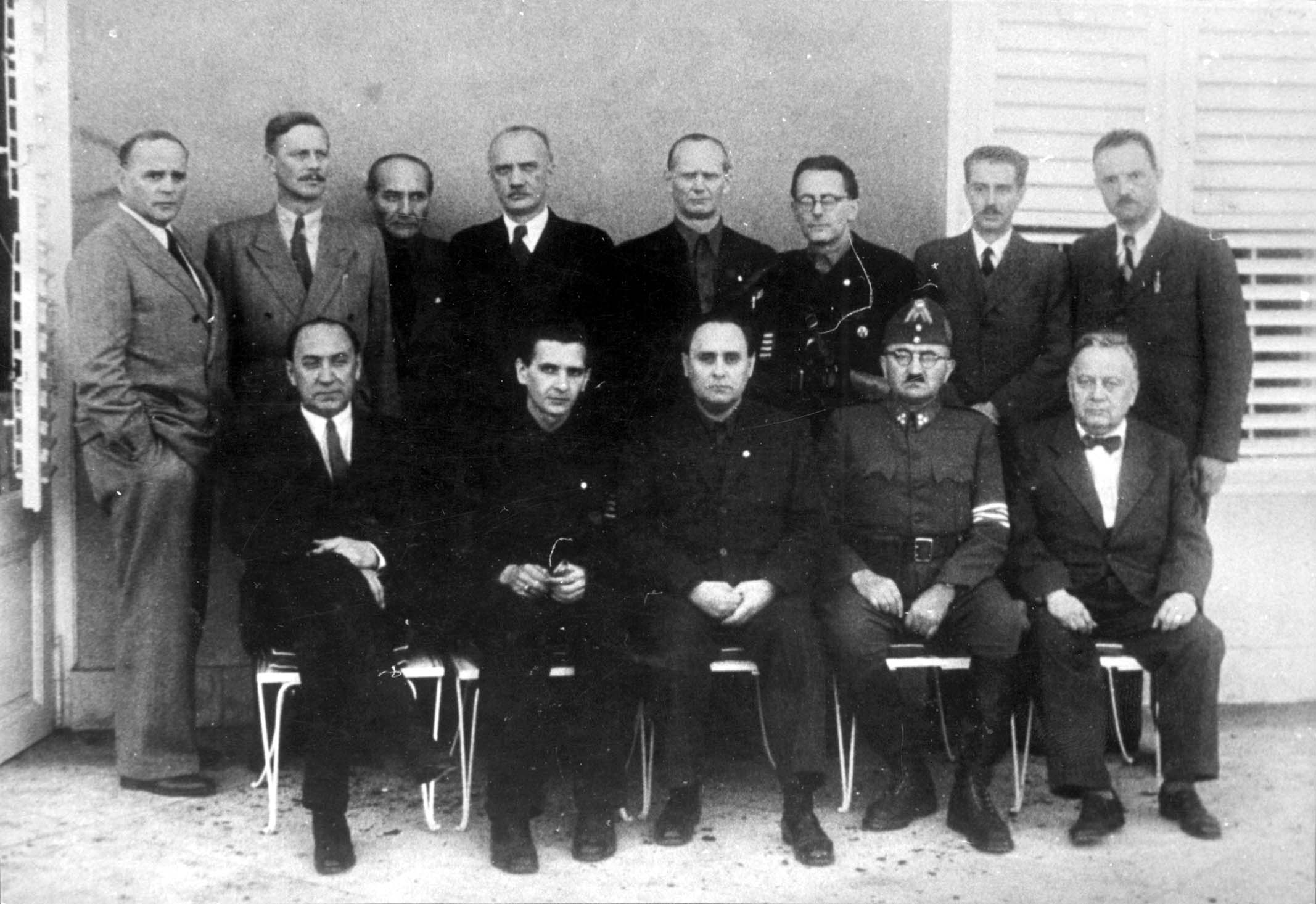
Szálasi (seated, center) and his ministers

Portfolio	Minister	Took office	Left office	Party
Leader of the Nation & Prime Minister	Ferenc Szálasi	16 October 1944	28 March 1945	NYKP
Deputy Prime Minister	Jenő Szöllősi	16 October 1944	28 March 1945	NYKP
Minister of the Interior	Gábor Vajna	16 October 1944	28 March 1945	NYKP
Minister of Foreign Affairs	Gábor Kemény	16 October 1944	28 March 1945	NYKP
Minister of Finance	Lajos Reményi-Schneller	16 October 1944	28 March 1945	Independent
Minister of Justice	László Budinszky	16 October 1944	28 March 1945	NYKP
Minister of Defence	Károly Beregfy	16 October 1944	28 March 1945	Independent
Minister of Religion and Education	Ferenc Rajniss	16 October 1944	7 March 1945	Party of Hungarian Life
Minister of Religion and Education	Ferenc Szálasi (act.)	7 March 1945	28 March 1945	NYKP
Minister of Agriculture	Fidél Pálffy	16 October 1944	28 March 1945	NYKP
Minister of Trade and Transport	Lajos Szász	16 October 1944	28 March 1945	NYKP
Minister of Industry	Emil Szakváry	16 October 1944	28 March 1945	Independent
Minister of Welfare	Béla Jurcsek	16 October 1944	28 March 1945	Independent
Minister without portfolio in charge of the full-scale mobilization and arming of the nation	Emil Kovarcz	16 October 1944	28 March 1945	Independent
Minister without portfolio in charge of National Defence and Propaganda	Ferenc Kassai-Schalmayer	16 October 1944	28 March 1945	NYKP
Minister without portfolio in charge of the continuous oversight of production	Vilmos Hellebronth	16 October 1944	28 March 1945	Independent
Minister without portfolio and special delegate to the Leader of the Nation, in charge of the Leader of the Nation's task force	Árpád Henney	16 October 1944	28 March 1945	Independent

== See also ==
- Hungary during World War II
- Operation "Panzerfaust"
- Szent László Infantry Division
