= Zoltán Meskó =

Hungarian Nazi politician

- Born: Zoltán Meskó de Széplak; 12 March 1883; Baja, Austria-Hungary
- Died: 10 June 1959 (aged 76); Nagybaracska, Hungary
- Citizenship: Hungarian
- Known for: Nazi politician
- Political party: Hungarian National Socialist Party
- Spouse: Margit Drescher
- Children: Lajos; Béla; Imre

Zoltán Meskó de Széplak (12 March 1883 – 10 June 1959) was a leading Hungarian Nazi during the 1930s. He led his own Nazi movement during the early 1930s but faded from the political scene when Hungary became a member of the Axis powers.

== Move to Nazism ==
Meskó came from a landowning family of Slovak origin and was first elected to parliament in 1931 as a representative of the Smallholders Party, an agrarian group. Following his election to parliament Meskó arrived at the Hungarian Parliament Building wearing the uniform of the German Sturmabteilung, and as a consequence he soon joined Zoltán Böszörmény's National Socialist Party of Work. Meskó would go on to announce in parliament that he was forming a 'Hungarian Hitlerite Movement', although Meskó's appearance in a homemade version of a foreign uniform attracted much hilarity in the parliamentary chamber.

== Greenshirts ==
In 1932 Meskó split from Böszörmény and joined the Hungarian National Socialist Agricultural Labourers and Workers Party, which sought to imitate the Nazi Party by emphasising anti-Semitism and by adopting both the brown-shirted uniform of the SA that Meskó had worn to parliament and the swastika. Meskó's personal admiration for Adolf Hitler was significant and he even went as far as growing a toothbrush moustache in an attempt to physically resemble Hitler.

Meskó's movement also utilised the arrow cross as its emblem, although it alternated this with a green swastika on a brown background and eventually abandoned the brown shirt in favour of a green alternative. As a result, the group became known colloquially as the Greenshirts and they continued to operate within Meskó's earlier field of agrarian politics to an extent by seeking to build a support base amongst landless peasants. The group was largely unsuccessful however and the Greenshirts were unable to establish anything approaching the mass following that Meskó sought.

== Later years ==
Meskó became one of the three leaders of the amalgamated Hungarian National Socialist Party in 1934, alongside Sándor Festetics, who had his own Hungarian National Socialist People's Party and Fidél Pálffy, whose group already bore the Hungarian National Socialist Party name. Meskó however was expelled as part of a power struggle the following year as Pálffy made himself sole leader. Meskó was noted as the least radical of Hungary's competing Nazi leaders as throughout his period as a leader he maintained a loyalty to the regency of Miklós Horthy where other Hungarian Nazis sought the Admiral's overthrowing.

Meskó initially attempted to reform the Greenshirts but he proved to be unsuccessful in these efforts. He was returned to parliament in the 1939 parliamentary election as an independent Nazi, although his fervour for Hitler had begun to dampen. Increasingly disillusioned with Nazi Germany, he played little role in the wartime politics of Hungary. Despite this he was sentenced to life imprisonment in 1945. Meskó was released from prison in 1956, but was returned to prison in 1957. He was freed once more ten days before his death in 1959.
