= Tamás Eszes =

Tamás Eszes may refer to:

- Tamás Eszes (sailor)
- Tamás Eszes (politician)
