= Vilmos Hellebronth =

Hungarian soldier and government official (1895–1971)

Minister of Armament Industry
- In office 16 October 1944 – 28 March 1945

Personal details
- Born: 24 February 1895 Kassa, Austria-Hungary
- Died: 20 May 1971 (aged 76) Budapest, Hungary
- Profession: Soldier

Vilmos Hellebronth (24 February 1895 – 20 May 1971) was a Hungarian soldier during World War II, after 16 October 1944, minister in Ferenc Szálasi's government.

== Life ==
Vilmos Hellebronth finished his military studies in the Ludovica Military Academy, after that, he was serving in World War I as a lieutenant of infantry. After the war, he became Lieutenant-Colonel and the armament material attendance head of department. In 1939 he was appointed to Colonel in the Chief of Staff of the Hungarian Royal Air Force and in 1942, he got the rank of major-general. Between 1942 and 1944 he was serving on the Eastern Front.

After the Government of National Unity was formed, Hellebronth was appointed to the minister of armament industry and he got the rank of Lieutenant-General. In his office, he controlled the relocating of the Hungarian armament industry's to Germany. When the Soviet Red Army arrived to Budapest, Hellebronth fled to Germany, where he was captured by American soldiers.

In 1945, Hellebronth was extradited back to Hungary, where the Hungarian People's Tribunal sentenced him to death. However, his sentence was changed to life imprisonment. Hellebronth was released from prison in 1963. He refrained from politics until his death in 1971.
