= László Baky =

Hungarian Nazi politician

- Born: 13 September 1898; Budapest, Austria-Hungary
- Died: 29 March 1946 (aged 47); Budapest, Hungary
- Cause of death: Execution by hanging
- Citizenship: Hungarian
- Occupation: Gendarme
- Known for: Nazi politician
- Political party: Hungarian National Socialist Party

László Baky (13 September 1898 – 29 March 1946) was a leading member of the Hungarian Nazi movement that flourished before and during World War II.

A military academy graduate, he came to prominence in Szeged in 1919 for his violent counterrevolutionary work and rose through the ranks to become one of the leading figures in the Gendarmerie. A member of several far right groups he finally left the gendarmes in 1938 (as a major-general) to join the Hungarian National Socialist Party, and passed through a number of incarnations of this fluid movement. He was elected as a deputy in 1939 and sat as a member of a Nazi coalition group. Close to Nazi Germany, he was appointed editor of the German-funded newspaper Magyarság. He soon became a close ally of Fidél Pálffy and the two united with the followers of General Ruszkay and Ferenc Szálasi to form a wider coalition of pro-Nazi conservatives and military men.

After the Nazi invasion and occupation of Hungary in March 1944, Baky was elevated to state secretary in the Ministry of the Interior, under Andor Jaross. Along with his fellow state secretary, László Endre, Baky eagerly accepted responsibility for deporting the country's Jews to the extermination camps. Soon after his ascension, he wrote in a letter to Jaross, "The Royal Hungarian Government will soon have the country purged of Jews. I order the purge to be carried out by regions. As a result of the purge the Jewry - irrespective of sex or age - is to be transported to assigned concentration camps." On 4 April he chaired a meeting attended by senior members of Adolf Eichmann's commando unit, as well as Endre and gendarmerie commander Lieutenant-Colonel László Ferenczy in which it was agreed that Jews, having first had their possessions seized, would be moved into urban ghettos before deportation to Germany. Under the direction of Eichmann Baky began the process of rounding up Jews in the eastern provinces of the country two days later.

Baky was removed from his positions during the summer of 1944 and was then arrested after conspiring, unsuccessfully, to lead a coup against Miklós Horthy, who also ordered Edmund Veesenmayer to stop the deportation of Jews. However Baky would return to prominence that October after Szálasi and the Arrow Cross were put in power by the Germans. Under the Arrow Cross he continued his labors in deportation and mass murder. He fled the country in 1945 but was arrested in Austria and returned to Budapest. In early 1946 Baky, Endre and Jaross were all tried, found guilty of crimes against the state and sentenced to death. Baky was hanged by the Austro-Hungarian pole method on 29 March 1946.
