= Lajos Polgár =

Hungarian politician (1916–2006)

Lajos Polgár, originally József Kardos (1916 – July 12, 2006) was a Hungarian official and member of the Arrow Cross Party of Hungary. Polgár led the Arrow Cross Party for two months in Budapest before moving to Melbourne, Australia in 1949. Polgár was indicted in February 2006 by the Australian government for war crimes committed as a member of the Arrow Cross Party, but the charges were dropped upon his death in July 2006.
