= András Kun =

Hungarian Roman Catholic priest and Holocaust perpetrator

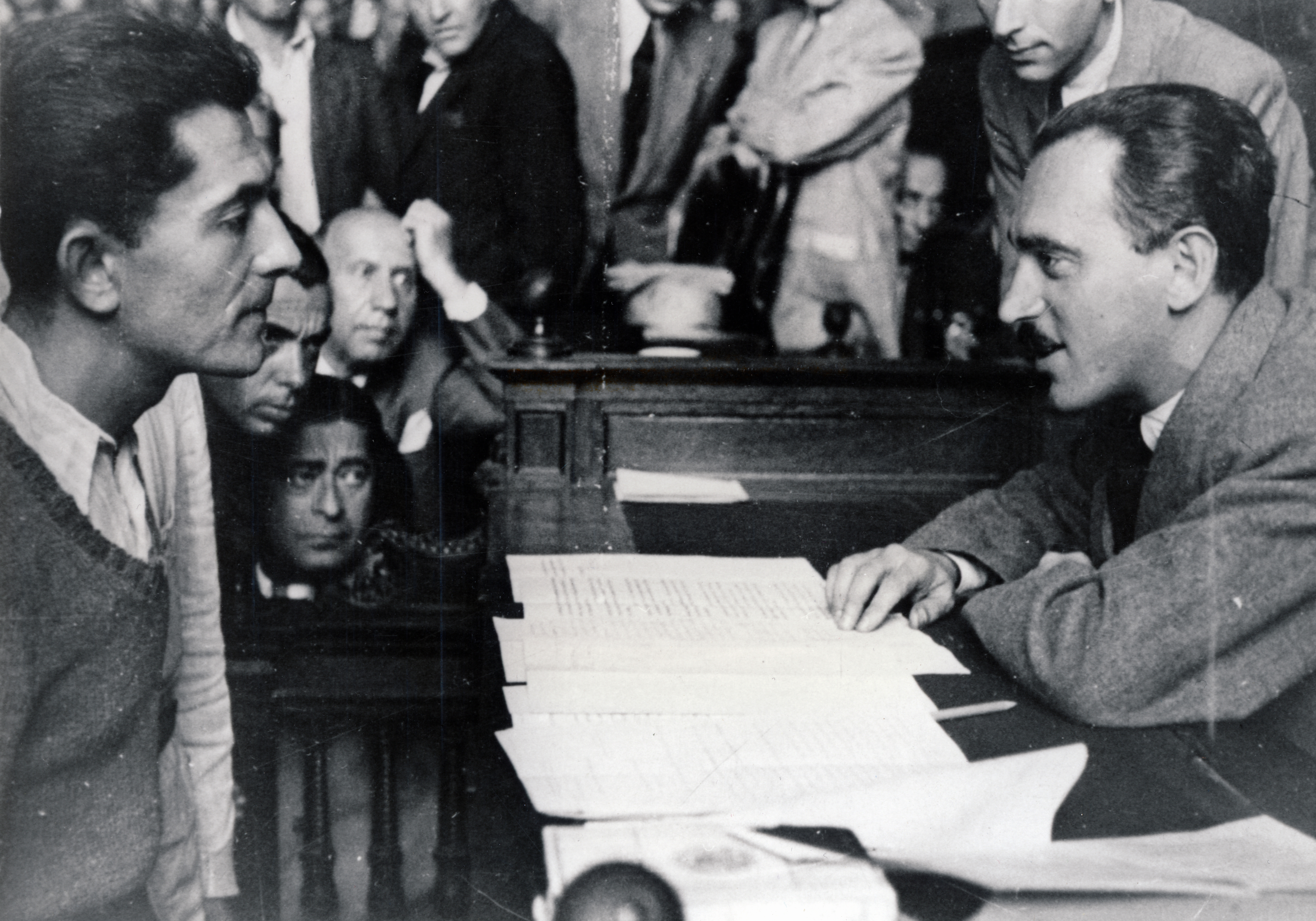
András Kun (on the left) being charged with participation in the Holocaust and war crimes before the People's Court; on the right is Gábor Péter, 1945

András Kun, O.F.M. (8 November 1911 – 19 September 1945 in Budapest, Hungary) was a Roman Catholic priest of the Franciscan Order. During the Holocaust in Hungary, Kun was also the commander of an antisemitic death squad for the Arrow Cross Party. After the Second World War, Kun was prosecuted for war crimes by a Hungarian People's Tribunal after Hungary's occupation by Soviet armies. He was convicted and hanged.

== Life ==
=== Early life and Church career ===
András Kun was born 8 November 1911 in Nyírbátor, Kingdom of Hungary. He attended seminary in Rome. He then served as a priest in a Franciscan monastery. In 1943, Kun was, according to journalist Rezső Szirmai, expelled from the monastery and moved to Budapest.

Although it is uncertain whether he ever had valid faculties, Kun sometimes gave sermons and offered Nuptial Masses at Sacred Heart of Jesus Roman Catholic Church in Városmajor.

=== Participation in the Holocaust ===
In early 1944, Kun enrolled in Hungary's Pro-Nazi Arrow Cross Party. During the lead-up to the German invasion of Hungary on 19 March 1944, Kun participated in the Arrow Cross' seizure of power by distributing weapons on 15 October 1944.

Kun later recalled, "The propaganda drilled into us the belief that the Jews lurk behind the Bolsheviks. Amidst the wildest battles, I stood with this conviction and, as Jews came before me, I beat them."

The Arrow Cross and the Schutzstaffel carried out deportations from April to October 1944, and death squad carried out attacks in the war zones from October 1944 to February 1945.

Meanwhile, Kun took command of an Arrow Cross department death squad in the XII. district in Budapest, after Ferenc Szálasi and his government left Budapest at the end of November 1944 because the town was besieged by the Soviet Red Army. His squad massacred the remaining Jews who were not only in the official Budapest Ghetto but in hospitals, homes for the elderly, houses that belonged to neutral states such as Switzerland and Sweden. He continued to dress in his cassock and Roman collar along with a holstered pistol and an Arrow Cross armband. His orders usually went, "In the name of Christ—fire!"

In a later interview with journalist Rezső Szirmai, Kun recalled, "I always wanted to reduce human misery and suffering. This is why I fought against the Jews. They are the lords of capital. The Jews were always the ones to walk on the sunny side of the street."

In January 1945 Kun ordered the arrest of Jewish author Ernő Ligeti and his family. Kun and his death squad brutally tortured Ligeti's son and his wife. The Ligetis were then taken to Arrow Cross headquarters at Andrássy út 60, interrogated, stripped naked and tied together. Then, around midnight, they faced a firing squad. Ernő Ligeti and his wife were killed on the spot, but their son Károly survived four bullets, recovered from his wounds, and later emigrated from Hungary.

On 12 January 1945, Kun's squad broke into the Jewish hospital in Maros street (Hospital of the Buda Chevra Kadisha), where 149 Jewish patients and doctors were summarily shot. On another occasion, the St. John's Hospital was invaded by Kun's unit and between 80 and 100 people were murdered. His squad also invaded sheltered housing and abducted some 500 Jews and their protectors. All were lined up and shot into the Danube River. On another occasion, men under Kun's command broke into a sanatorium, where 100 Jewish patients were shot to death.

Kun did not flee the city before the Siege of Budapest but remained behind while continuing operations. As the enclosed area narrowed in January, the bridges of Budapest were blown up by Germans forces. At the end of December 1944, the Southern Connecting Railway Bridge; on January 15 the Miklós Horthy Bridge; on the 16th the Ferenc József Bridge; and the last 2 were blown up on January 18. Kun helped local squads to move and escape to Buda and he put his headquarter back to the XII. district. His squad routinely subjected Gentiles who were hiding Jews to torture and execution.

At the end, even the official Arrow Cross government authorities (Nemzeti Számonkérő szék) were fed up with his atrocities (he started attacking premises under the protection of the neutral countries, especially Switzerland and Sweden). So on about 18 January 1945 a police patrol was ordered to capture him at his headquarters in 5th Németvölgyi út. Kun captured them, beat all of them, and then sent them back. 10 more policemen were sent, but Kun also captured them, beat their commanders, and locked them in the basement. Eventually, 60 police officers surrounded his headquarters and then issued an ultimatum: if Kun and some of his companions were not produced within 10 minutes, a machine gun attack would be launched to occupy the building. The insiders handed over the men, ending Kun's three-month terror.

Among the charges he faced were beating Lieutenant Colonel Rezső Mindák, as well as severely abusing a section of police officers. He was sentenced to death on the count of 27 murders. He was saved from execution by Ferenc Szálasi, who changed the sentence to 15 years in prison by his radio telegram.

He was presumably released from prison by Soviet troops who did not know who the prisoners were so they let out everyone. He vanished over the following months. He probably pretended to be a Romanian citizen (he also spoke Romanian) and left for Arad with the Romanian troops involved in the siege of Budapest. From here he intended to escape to Italy, but on the Hungarian side of the border he was captured on August 3, 1945, around Dombegyháza by the border guard.

He was transported to Budapest on August 30 for trial.

=== Capture and execution ===
Soon after his release, the Soviet Army completed their capture of Budapest. Kun was arrested and tried for 500 murders by a Hungarian People's Tribunal. On the day of his execution, he gave an interview to journalist Rezső Szirmai. In the interview, Kun admitted to beating Jews, but denied killing anyone and claimed to have been falsely convicted. Kun told Szirmai that he considered himself to be even more of a victim than any of the Jews murdered in the Holocaust.

When Szirmai commented that the manner in which Kun had treated his victims displayed signs of sadism, Kun replied, "This perversion exists, in a dormant state, in every soul." When asked if it existed in his soul as well, Kun responded: "If it did, then it was dormant. I was not conscious of it."

Kun was executed by hanging in Budapest on September 19, 1945.

== Legacy ==
Rezső Szirmai went on to interview 20 other Arrow Cross war criminals and published a book-length collection of his interviews, Fasiszta lelkek ("Fascist Souls"), in 1946. Some of his other interview subjects included Ferenc Szálasi, Andor Jaross, and Béla Imrédy. After the fall of Communism in Hungary, a second edition was published in 1993.

Kun's cassock is currently on display at the House of Terror in Budapest. In his bestselling history of the Siege of Budapest, Hungarian historian Krisztián Ungváry describes Kun's crimes in detail. In the process, however, he also comments that, while Kun and his unit were massacring Jews, the Papal Nuncio to Hungary, Angelo Rotta, was working closely with Raoul Wallenberg and other neutral diplomats and helped to save tens of thousands of Jewish lives.
