= 1939 Hungarian parliamentary election =

- 28–29 May 1939

All 260 elected seats in the Diet 131 seats needed for a majority
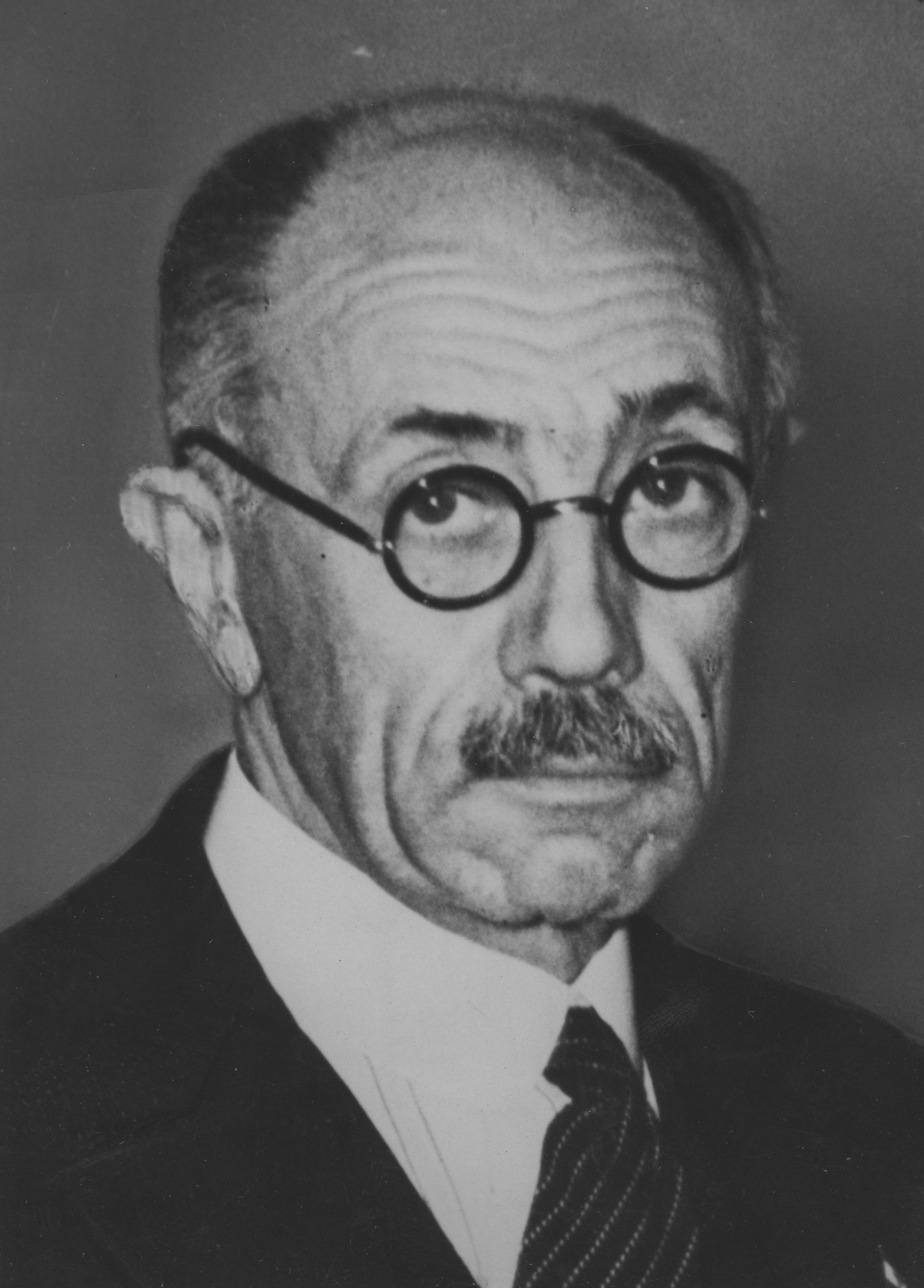

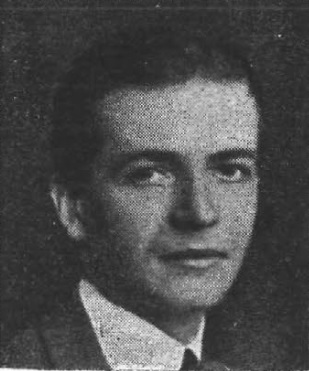

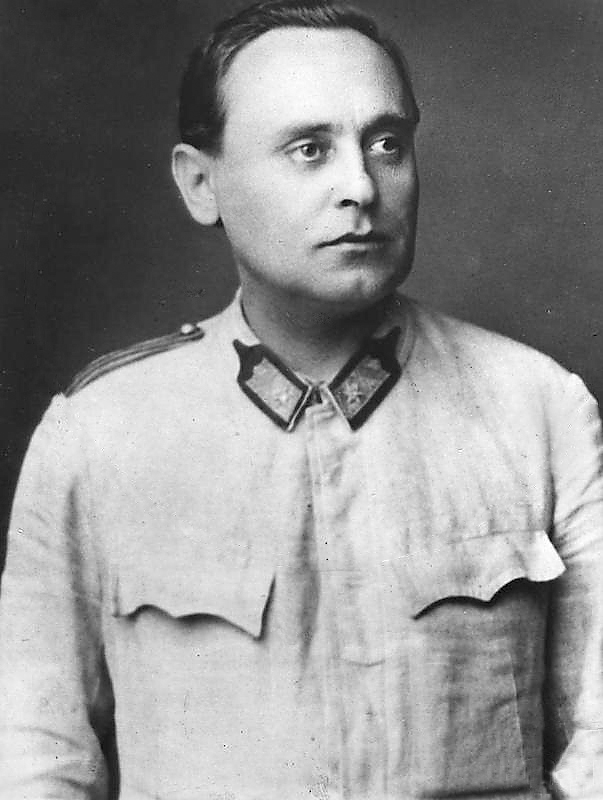
	First party	Second party	Third party
Leader	Pál Teleki	Tibor Eckhardt	Ferenc Szálasi
Party	MÉP	FKgP	NYKP
Seats won	181 / 260	14 / 260	29 / 260
Popular vote	1,824,573	569,054	530,405
Percentage	49.49%	15.44%	14.39%
Prime Minister before election
Pál Teleki
MÉP
Prime Minister after election
Pál Teleki
MÉP

Parliamentary elections were held in Hungary on 28 and 29 May 1939. The result was a victory for the Party of Hungarian Life, which won 181 of the 260 seats in Parliament (72 percent of the parliament's seats) and won 49 percent of the popular vote in the election. Pál Teleki remained Prime Minister. This was a major breakthrough for the far-right in Hungary; between them, far-right parties were officially credited with 49 seats and 25 percent of the vote.

This was the closest thing to a free election that Hungary had seen at that point. According to historian Stanley G. Payne, the far-right bloc would have almost certainly won more seats had the election been conducted in a truly fair manner, and possibly garnered an "approximately equal" seat count and vote share with the Party of Hungarian Life.

== Electoral system ==
The electoral system was changed from that used in 1935. The number of single-member constituencies was reduced from 199 to 135, whilst the number of multi-member constituencies was raised from 11 to 38. Additionally, the franchise had been significantly expanded, with all men over 26 and all women over 30 now allowed to vote.

== Parties and leaders ==
Party	Leader
Hungarian Life Party (MÉP)	Pál Teleki
Independent Smallholders, Agrarian Workers and Civic Party (FKgP)	Tibor Eckhardt
Arrow Cross Party (NYKP)	Ferenc Szálasi
Social Democratic Party of Hungary (MSZDP)	Árpád Szakasits
Christian National Socialist Front (KNSZF)	Károly Maróthy
United Hungarian National Socialist Party (EMNSZP)	Fidél Pálffy
National Front (NF)	János Salló
Civic Freedom Party (PSZP)	Károly Rassay
United Christian Party (EKP)	János Zichy

== Results ==
Party	Votes	%	Seats	+/–
Party of Hungarian Life	1,824,573	49.49	181	+17
Independent Smallholders Party	569,054	15.44	14	–8
Arrow Cross Party	530,405	14.39	29	New
Social Democratic Party of Hungary	126,237	3.42	5	–6
Christian National Socialist Front	87,533	2.37	3	New
United Hungarian National Socialist Party	78,806	2.14	4	New
National Front	64,355	1.75	3	New
Civic Freedom Party	58,639	1.59	5	–
United Christian Party	56,943	1.54	4	–11
Unofficial Party of Hungarian Life candidates	46,802	1.27	0	–6
Hungarian National Socialist Agricultural Labourers' and Workers' Party	36,137	0.98	3	New
National Reform Party	22,122	0.60	0	New
Christian National Independence Party	14,024	0.38	0	New
Hungarian National Socialist Party	10,872	0.29	0	–2
People's Will Party	8,970	0.24	1	New
National Smallholders, Craftsmen and Workers Party	6,110	0.17	0	New
Independent People's Party	3,568	0.10	0	New
National Agricultural Labourers, Craftsmen and Workers Party	3,453	0.09	0	New
Christian Opposition	2,384	0.06	0	–1
Hungarian Race Protection Party	1,288	0.03	0	New
Far-right independents	108,937	2.95	6	New
Independents	25,391	0.69	2	–8
Total	3,686,603	100.00	260	15
Valid votes	3,686,603	94.33		
Invalid/blank votes	221,519	5.67		
Total votes	3,908,122	100.00		
Registered voters/turnout	4,355,778	89.72		
Source: Nohlen & Stöver

The total number of registered voters was 4,629,493, but only 4,355,778 voters were registered in contested seats.

=== By constituency type ===
Party	SMCs (Note: The number of votes refers to only 125 of the 135 single-member constituencies, as 10 seats were uncontested.)			MMCs (Note: The number of votes refers to 36 of the 38 MMCs as two were uncontested.)			Total seats
Party	Votes	%	Seats	Votes	%	Seats	Total seats
Party of Hungarian Life	766,694	51.33	112	1,057,879	48.24	69	181
Independent Smallholders Party	228,571	15.30	1	340,483	15.53	13	14
Arrow Cross Party	192,356	12.88	7	338,049	15.41	22	29
Social Democratic Party of Hungary	12,630	0.85	0	113,607	5.18	5	5
United Hungarian National Socialist Party	54,887	3.67	3	23,919	1.09	1	4
National Front	28,341	1.90	2	36,014	1.64	1	3
Civic Freedom Party	873	0.06	0	57,766	2.63	5	5
Christian National Socialist Front	40,114	2.69	1	47,419	2.16	2	3
United Christian Party	19,970	1.34	3	36,973	1.69	1	4
Unofficial Party of Hungarian Life candidates	46,802	3.13	0				0
Hungarian National Socialist Agricultural Labourers' and Workers' Party	13,010	0.87	1	23,127	1.05	2	3
National Reform Party	4,489	0.30	0	17,633	0.80	0	0
Christian National Independence Party				14,024	0.64	0	0
Hungarian National Socialist Party	10,872	0.73	0				0
People's Will Party	8,970	0.60	1				1
National Smallholders, Craftsmen and Workers Party	6,110	0.41	0				0
Independent People's Party				3,568	0.16	0	0
National Agricultural Labourers, Craftsmen and Workers Party	3,453	0.23	0				0
Christian Opposition				2,384	0.11	0	0
Hungarian Racist Party	1,288	0.09	0				0
Far-right independents	28,728	1.92	2	80,209	3.66	4	6
Independents	25,391	1.70	2				2
Total	1,493,549	100.00	135	2,193,054	100.00	125	260
Valid votes	1,493,549	95.49		2,193,054	93.56		
Invalid/blank votes	70,581	4.51		150,938	6.44		
Total votes	1,564,130	100.00		2,343,992	100.00		
Registered voters/turnout	1,719,221	90.98		2,636,557	88.90		
Source: Nohlen & Stöver
