= Sándor Festetics =

Hungarian nobleman and cabinet minister

Count Sándor Festetics de Tolna
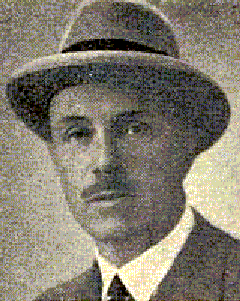
- Born: Sándor Ágost Dénes Festetics de Tolna; 31 May 1882; Dég, Austria-Hungary
- Died: 12 September 1956 (aged 74); Balatonrendes, Hungary
- Citizenship: Hungarian
- Known for: Politician
- Title: Minister of War
- Term: 1918–1919
- Predecessor: Albert Bartha
- Successor: Vilmos Böhm
- Political party: Hungarian National Socialist Peoples Party
- Spouse: Countess Júlia Károlyi de Nagykároly
- Parent(s): Count Andor Festetics de Tolna; Lenke Pejacsevich de Verőcze

Count Sándor Ágost Dénes Festetics de Tolna (31 May 1882 – 12 September 1956) was a Hungarian nobleman and cabinet minister who later became an advocate of Nazism in Hungary.

== Background ==
Coming from one of Hungary's leading families (his father was Andor Festetics), Count Festetics was amongst those chosen to serve in the cabinet of Mihály Károlyi, being appointed Minister of Defence in 1918. Although this was to prove ill-fated, Festetics remained committed to parliamentary politics, becoming a supporter of István Bethlen.

== Politics and embrace of Nazism ==
After a spell away from politics, Festetics, who had become convinced of Nazism, took charge of the tiny Hungarian National Socialist Peoples Party in 1933, using the fortune he had inherited from his uncle Prince Tasziló to seek to expand the group. This party was effectively a copy of the Nazi Party, taking over most of its 25 point programme. By 1934, he had come together with Zoltán Meskó and Fidél Pálffy to form an alliance of their movements. Before long, however, he was expelled as his commitment to anti-Semitism was seen to be weak; Festetics had continued to employ Jews on his estates.

He then became associated with minor movements led by István Balogh and Kálmán Hubay, sitting in parliament from 1935 until his retirement in 1939 under various labels.

In keeping with some of his contemporaries who preached against the influence of the Jews, Festetics was attracted to the idea of Zionism as a solution to what he saw as the Jewish problem in Europe. Indeed, in a 1934 session of Parliament, he announced that the Zionists should be encouraged because all people, including the Jews, had a right to live in their own land, and revealed that he had even allowed a Zionist organisation to use his land for an agricultural training programme for a group of Jewish youths who were preparing to migrate to Palestine.

== Retirement from politics ==
Festetics brought an end to his political career in 1939. He took no active part in politics during the Second World War, and died a private citizen at his home near Lake Balaton in 1956.

Political offices
Preceded by Albert Bartha	Minister of War; 1918–1919	Succeeded by Vilmos Böhm
