= United Hungarian National Socialist Party =

Political party

The United Hungarian National Socialist Party (Hungarian: Egyesült Magyar Nemzeti Szocialista Párt, EMNSP) was a far-right political party in Hungary during the late 1930s.

== History ==
The party first contested national elections in 1939, winning four seats in the National Assembly in the parliamentary elections that year. Following the outbreak of World War II the party did not contest any further elections.

== Election results ==
Election	Leader	Votes	%	Seats	Rank	Status
1939	Fidél Pálffy	78,806	2.14	4 / 260	5th	Opposition
