= Christian National Socialist Front =

Hungarian political party

The Christian National Socialist Front (Hungarian: Keresztény Nemzeti Szocialista Front, KNSZF) was a far-right political party in Hungary during the late 1930s.

== History ==
The party was formed in 1937 as a breakaway from the new United Christian Party (EKP), which had been established as a merger of the Christian Economic and Social Party, the Christian Opposition and the National Legitimist Party earlier in the year. Due to disagreements some of the members left to other parties while under the exclusive leadership of Károly Maróthy-Meizler the remainder of the leaving members merged into the National Front. Though the parties formed one organization, in the 1939 elections they participated separately, though they did not run members against each other and they had also common candidates. The Christian National Socialist Front won three MPs, the National Front three MPs, including Károly Maróthy-Meizler.

The elections saw the party finish ahead of the EKP in terms of vote share, but it won only three seats compared to the four won by the EKP. Shortly after the National Front merged fully into the party, before itself would merge into the Arrow Cross Party in 1940.

== Election results ==
=== National Assembly ===
Election	Votes	%	Seats	Rank	Status
1939	57,533	2.37	3 / 260	8th	Opposition
