= Tamás Eszes (politician) =

- Eszes Tamás
- Born: 18 May 1964
- Died: 3 November 2011 (aged 47); Gyöngyöspata, Heves County, Hungary
- Organization: Véderő
- Known for: Paramilitary leader

Tamás Eszes (18 May 1964 – 3 November 2011) was a Hungarian politician. He was the leader of the far right paramilitary group Véderő.

In April 2011 Eszes attempted to lead a training camp conducted by Véderő. He was arrested and led away by police. Eszes, a karate instructor, claimed the camp was intended to improve the physical condition of Hungarian youths. The incident highlighted tensions between ethnic Hungarians and the local gypsy minority.

In the same month Eszes announced that he would contest the mayoral election in Gyöngyöspata, Heves County. He received 10.5% of the vote.

Eszes was found dead at his home in Gyöngyöspata on 3 November 2011. He had committed suicide according to the police.

== Sources ==
- "Hungarian Roma Flee From Far-Right Group". news.sky.com. 23 April 2011.
- McLaughlin, Daniel (28 April 2011). "Hungary promises to tackle far-right vigilantes after four hurt in clashes". www.irishtimes.com.
