= Hungarian National Defence Association =

Early far-right paramilitary group with fascist leanings and ideology

Emblem of MOVE, ca. 1920

The Hungarian National Defence Association (Hungarian: Magyar Országos Véderő Egyesület or MOVE) was a far-right movement active in Hungary. The structure of the group was largely paramilitary and as such separate from its leader's later political initiatives.

MOVE grew out of the 'right radicals' phenomenon i.e. those who strongly opposed the Hungarian Soviet Republic but who felt that the mainstream conservatives were not strong enough to cope with the shift to communism. An extreme group of these radicals within the army formed around Gyula Gömbös in Szeged and in 1919 solidified as MOVE (or the Szeged Fascists) as they were more commonly known. Already self identifying as 'national socialists' in 1919, the group called for changes in land ownership, a more Christian economic policy against the capitalism which they identified as Jewish and a foreign policy based on revanchism. The group was led by the likes of László Endre and Gyula Gömbös, although it was forced underground in 1937 when rumours circulated that it was planning a coup.

When Miklós Horthy ousted the communists MOVE was largely turned over to him, although it continued to develop along fascist lines, offering support for Benito Mussolini and establishing contacts with Adolf Hitler and Erich Ludendorff in Germany. Under Horthy MOVE enjoyed a final period of influence as all existing Nazi and rightist paramilitary groups were merged into it.

In 1945, MOVE was banned under decree 529/1945, ME regulation, §3.

== Resurgence ==
In the summer of 2007 a group calling itself the "Hungarian National Defence Association" was formed with similar goals to the original. The association soon split in half with the paramilitary branch operating independently. The paramilitary branch is known as "Véderő" for short. It was led by Tamás Eszes.

== See also ==
- Hungarian nationalism
- Unity Party (Hungary)
- Szeged Idea
