= Hungarian National Socialist Party =

Hungarian National Socialist Party Magyar Nemzeti Szocialista Párt
- Founded: 1920s
- Dissolved: 1944
- Merged into: Arrow Cross Party
- Ideology: Nazism; Antisemitism; Hungarian Turanism
- Political position: Far-right

The Hungarian National Socialist Party (Hungarian: Magyar Nemzeti Szocialista Párt) was a political epithet adopted by a number of minor Nazi parties in Hungary before the Second World War.

== Early Nazi groups ==
From its early origins up to the eventual fall of the Third Reich Nazism had a profound impact on Hungarian politics and as a consequence several "clone movements" were established in the country during the interbellum period. The initial HNSP was organised in the 1920s, but did not gain any influence. Nevertheless, this incarnation of the party carried on into the 1930s.

A second group, the National Socialist Party of Work, was founded by Zoltán Böszörmény in 1931. The movement soon became known as the Scythe Cross due to its party emblem. The Scythe Cross was fairly small, but it was the first fascist movement in Hungary to directly call for land and social reform for peasants. Many fascist movements afterward, including the Arrow Cross Party, followed this example and gained rural support. The Scythe Cross movement was the most strongly Nazi of the various parties, its manifesto simply being a direct translation of the National Socialist Program while it strongly pushed anti-Semitism as a central part of its rhetoric.

The Greenshirts were amongst the groups to use the Arrow Cross

The Hungarian National Socialist Agricultural Labourers' and Workers' Party (HNSALWP) was formed in 1933 as a splinter group from the Smallholders Party under Zoltán Meskó. This party appealed specifically to landless peasants. It soon absorbed the original HNSP and its followers became known as the Greenshirts for their distinctive uniforms. They also adopted the Arrow Cross as their symbol.

Around the same time Sándor Graf Festetics, who had briefly served as Minister of Defence during the government of Mihály Károlyi, set up his own Hungarian National Socialist People's Party (HNSPP). A rival group, going by the name of HNSP, also emerged under the leadership of Count Fidél Pálffy (who was later viewed by the SS as a candidate to lead the country). This group adopted the swastika as its emblem and the National Socialist Program as its policy document and even attempted to organise their own SA and SS, though on a much smaller scale than in Germany. Both of these groups looked directly to Nazi Germany for their inspiration and copied the Nazi Party as much as they could. Both were also banned soon after their formation by the government, although they continued underground.

== Attempts at unity ==
In 1934 the HNSALWP, the HNSPP and Pálffy's HNSP concluded a formal alliance, although before long Festetics was expelled for his perceived 'softness' on the issue of Hungary's Jews. He went on to join another HNSP that was organised in Debrecen by István Balogh. Both Balogh and Festetics were elected to parliament for this group in 1935.

The two remaining parties came together as the National Socialist Party of Hungary in 1935 and before long Pálffy had seen off Meskó as well to leave him as sole leader. As a consequence Meskó re-established the HNSALWP, although it failed to gain much support.

== Scythe Cross rebellion ==
While the various factions had struggled to gain some sort of unity the Scythe Cross movement had remained independent. The group pushed a strong platform of anti-Semitism and anti-communism and, drawing its support from the working classes, soon came to be seen as a potential danger by the government of Miklós Horthy. Support was particularly strong amongst the poor seasonal workers who picked up casual labour on the large estates at harvest time, and when over 100 were arrested they all declared themselves willing to die for the 'Idea' espoused by Böszörmény.

Developing a militia structure, the Scythe Cross opted for insurgency and launched a rebellion of sorts on May Day 1936. A few thousand supporters of the group mobilised with the stated intention of marching on Budapest, with the capital denounced in their rhetoric as "sinful". However the still fairly small and poorly equipped group was no match for the army and it was quickly put down. As a result, the group was banned and suppressed by the government and Böszörmény went into exile in Germany.

== Unity under Szálasi ==
While this was going on Ferenc Szálasi had emerged as a strong leader of his own Party of National Will (later the Arrow Cross Party). This group soon became the focus for unity, absorbing first Balogh's group in 1937 before adopting the HNSP moniker for his own group that same year. Before long Szálasi had brought all the main talent bar Festetics, who was closer to the aristocracy despite his flirtation with Nazism, under his umbrella.

== War-time experience ==
The Arrow Cross was banned when war broke out and as a result Szálasi found unity difficult to maintain. Pálffy joined with László Baky to relaunch the HNSP almost immediately and this group had 15 deputies by 1940 when it once again merged into Szálasi's group. This merger was not to last however as in 1941 they broke away to form Hungarian Renewal - National Socialist Party (HRNSP), which had as many as 44 deputies. Supported by the German-funded newspaper Magyarság, the party made little headway, although it was one of the few allowed to continue after the German invasion and played a minor role in the government of Szálasi. The HRNSP was officially merged into the Arrow Cross in 1944, although separate organisations largely continued to function until the end of the war.

None of the various claimants to the title of Hungarian National Socialist Party survived the Second World War.

== Electoral results ==
=== National Assembly ===
Election	Votes			Seats		Rank	Government	Leader of the national list
Election	#	%	±pp	#	+/−	Rank	Government	Leader of the national list
1926	1,118	0.1%	▲0.1	0 / 260	▲	11th	in opposition	
1935	57,544	3.9%	▲3.9	2 / 260	▲	5th	in opposition	
1939	10,872	0.7%	▼	0 / 260	▼	14th	in opposition	

== Bibliography ==
- F.L. Carsten, The Rise of Fascism, London: Methuen & Co, 1974
- Stanley G. Payne, A History of Fascism 1914-1945, London, Routledge, 2001
- English-language review of Rudolf Paksa, Magyar nemzetiszocialisták (Hungarian National Socialists). Budapest: Osiris, 2013: Originally published on HSozKult.
