= Hungarian National Socialist Agricultural Labourers' and Workers' Party =

Hungarian National Socialist Agricultural Labourers' and Workers' Party Magyar Nemzeti Szocialista Földmunkás és Munkáspárt
- Leader: Zoltán Meskó
- Founded: 16 July 1932
- Split from: Smallholders Party
- Headquarters: Budapest
- Ideology: Nazism
- Political position: Far-right

Party flag

The Hungarian National Socialist Agricultural Labourers' and Workers' Party (Hungarian: Magyar Nemzeti Szocialista Földmunkás és Munkáspárt, MNSZFMP) was a far-right political party in Hungary during the late 1930s.

== History ==
The group was established on 16 July 1932 as a splinter group from the Smallholders Party under Zoltán Meskó. This party appealed specifically to landless peasants. Before long it subsumed the original Hungarian National Socialist Party and its followers became known as the Greenshirts for their distinctive uniforms.

They adopted the Arrow Cross as their symbol, although other emblems utilised included the swastika. A brown shirt was briefly worn before being replaced by their more familiar green shirted uniform. Although it was closely associated with the Nazi tendency in Hungarian politics, the group was considered one of its least radical representatives and was consistently loyal to the Regency of Miklós Horthy.

The party first contested national elections in 1939, winning three seats in the parliamentary elections that year. Following the outbreak of World War II the party did not contest any further elections. It failed to develop any sort of mass following.

== Election results ==
=== National Assembly ===
Election	Votes	%	Seats	Rank	Status
1939	36,137	1.0	3 / 260	11th	Opposition
