= National Front (Hungary) =

1930s Hungarian political party

The National Front (Hungarian: Nemzeti Front, NF) was a far-right political party in Hungary during the late 1930s.

== History ==
The party was formed in October 1936 by Ferenc Rajniss and János Salló. In the 1939 elections the NF won three seats. In 1939 they merged with the Christian National Socialist Front under the leadership of Károly Maróthy.

== Election results ==
=== National Assembly ===
Election	Votes			Seats		Rank	Government	Leader of the national list
Election	#	%	±pp	#	+/−	Rank	Government	Leader of the national list
1939	64,355	1.7%	▲1.7	3 / 260	▲3	6th	in opposition	János Salló
