= Zoltán Böszörmény =

Hungarian politician (1893–?)

- Born: Zoltán Böszörmény; 5 January 1893; Budapest, Hungary
- Died: after 1945
- Education: University of Budapest
- Known for: Nazi politician
- Political party: Scythe Cross

Zoltán Böszörmény (Hungarian pronunciation: [ˈzoltaːn ˈbøsørmeːni]; 5 January 1893 – ?) was a leading exponent of Fascism in Hungary before the Second World War.

The son of a bankrupt landowner, he initially worked a series of odd jobs, ranging from a labourer to a porter. He first flirted with politics in 1919 when he became involved in activity against Béla Kun, albeit on a very minor scale. Whilst studying at the University of Budapest he became leader of the state student movement and a supporter of Gyula Gömbös. Whilst at University he also became a poet, writing largely patriotic verses published by two agents who would later become involved in the organisation of his political movement.

He formed the National Socialist Party of Work in 1931, and a meeting with Adolf Hitler that same year convinced him further of the benefits of Nazism. The group followed Hitler's lead closely, adopting the brown shirt and swastika whilst publishing the newspaper National Socialist. As the Scythe Cross, Böszörmény's movement grew to have some 20,000 followers at its peak, although Gömbös, fearing the growing power of the movement, suppressed it. As lead of the movement Böszörmény insisted on the title vezér or 'great leader' in imitation of Hitler's Führer. A word-for-word translation of the Nazi Party's National Socialist Program served as the founding document for the Scythe Cross.

Despite government attention, Böszörmény managed to hold on to his power base in the Tiszántúl region, preaching a mixture of anti-Semitism and land reform. Böszörmény was certainly confident of his own abilities as a leader and thinker, writing in 1932 that "even among the giants of intellect I am a giant, a great Hungarian poet with a prophetic mission". Despite this supreme confidence Böszörmény was frustrated in his attempts to gain power, frequently attempting to contest by-elections but failing to gain the necessary recommendations for candidacy on all but one occasion (when he captured only a few hundred votes).

He was impressed by Mussolini's March on Rome and planned to launch a similar coup on Budapest. Dressing his followers in second-hand uniforms, Böszörmény attempted to launch a revolution on 1 May 1936 but it was quickly put down and Böszörmény, who pleaded insanity at his subsequent trial, was sentenced to two and a half years in prison. He escaped to Germany in 1938 and saw out the war there. He petitioned Mátyás Rákosi to allow him to return to Hungary in 1945 as a member of the Hungarian Communist Party, although permission was denied and he is believed to have died in Germany.
