= Fidél Pálffy =

Hungarian nobleman (1895 - 1946)

Count Fidél Pálffy
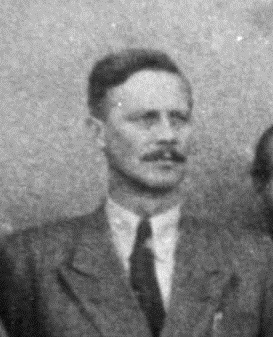
- Count Fidel Pálffy, 1944
- Born: Fidél Pálffy de Erdőd; 6 May 1895; Szentgyörgy, Austria-Hungary (now Svätý Jur, Slovakia)
- Died: 2 March 1946 (aged 50); Budapest, Hungary
- Cause of death: Execution by hanging
- Citizenship: Hungarian
- Known for: Politician and nobleman
- Title: Minister of Agriculture
- Political party: Hungarian National Socialist Party; Arrow Cross Party
- Spouse: Irén Filipanits
- Children: Klára, Irén, Alexandra

Count Fidél Pálffy ab Erdőd (6 May 1895 – 2 March 1946) was a Hungarian nobleman who emerged as a leading supporter of Nazism in Hungary.

== Early life ==
After service in the First World War he lived on an estate in Czechoslovakia before returning to Hungary, where he was left bankrupt by the Great Depression of 1929.

== Pro-Nazi activity ==
He founded a group called the Hungarian National Socialist Party in 1933 and later merged it with two similar groups under Sándor Festetics and Zoltán Meskó. By 1935 Pálffy had assumed control of this group, although it failed to prosper as support drifted to Gyula Gömbös. Devoid of influence, Pálffy turned to Germany and became an agent of the RSHA. Seeking to regain the initiative he worked variously with László Baky and Ferenc Szálasi in an attempt to launch a pro-German party. He finally achieved this goal in 1941 by relaunching the Hungarian National Socialist Party with Baky, although the party was not considered conservative when compared to the Arrow Cross Party.

== World War II activism and execution ==
Pálffy was considered by the SS to be a suitable candidate to lead Hungary, although ultimately the choice was not approved. He also became an important contact for Wilhelm Höttl during his work on behalf of the SS in Budapest. Ultimately, as Minister of Agriculture during the period of Nazi dominance, Pálffy was held to be guilty of collaboration and was hanged for treason in March 1946. His execution did prove somewhat controversial however because, beyond his pro-Nazi writings and his membership in Szálasi's government, there was little evidence of any crimes he had committed. Nonetheless, Pálffy was one of the first members of the government to face trial. The novelty of the case, as well as his status as a member of one of the country's leading noble families, counted against him and he was sent to the gallows.

Political offices
Preceded by Béla Jurcsek	Minister of Agriculture; 1944–1945	Succeeded by Imre Nagy
