= Arrow Cross Party =

1935–1945 fascist political party in Hungary

Arrow Cross Party – Hungarist Movement Nyilaskeresztes Párt – Hungarista Mozgalom
- Leader: Ferenc Szálasi
- Founded: 15 March 1939; 87 years ago
- Dissolved: 7 May 1945; 81 years ago
- Preceded by: NSZMP – HM
- Headquarters: Andrássy út 60, Budapest
- Newspaper: Magyar Futár
- Armed wing: Pártszolgálat (1944–45)
- Membership: approx. 300,000 (1939 est.)
- Ideology: Hungarism (Note: Significantly influenced by Nazism.)
- Political position: Far-right
- Political alliance: Hungarian National Socialist Party (until 1941)
- Colours: Red White Green
- Anthem: Ébredj Magyar! (lit. 'Wake up Hungarian!')

The Arrow Cross Party was a far-right, Hungarian ultranationalist party led by Ferenc Szálasi, which formed a government in Hungary they named the Government of National Unity. They were in power from 15 October 1944 to 28 March 1945. During its short rule, ten to fifteen thousand civilians were murdered, including many Jews and Romani, and 80,000 people were deported from Hungary to concentration camps in Austria. After the war, the Arrow Cross leaders were tried and found guilty as war criminals by Hungarian courts. In March 1946, Szálasi and three of his key henchmen were hanged.

== Formation ==
The party was founded by Ferenc Szálasi in 1935 as the Party of National Will. It had its origins in the political philosophy of pro-German extremists such as Gyula Gömbös, who coined the term "national socialism" in the 1920s. The party was outlawed in 1937 but was reconstituted in 1939 as the Arrow Cross Party, and was modeled fairly explicitly on the Nazi Party of Germany, although Szálasi often harshly criticized the Nazi regime of Germany.

== Emblem and symbolism ==
The party's iconography was clearly inspired by that of the Nazis.

The Nyilaskereszt ("arrow cross") emblem was considered a symbol of the Magyar tribes, who, from the late 9th century, conquered and settled in what became Hungary. In emulating the central role of the swastika in Nazi ideology, the arrow cross also alluded to the purported racial purity of the Magyars, in the same way that the swastika was intended to allude to the purported racial purity of the Germans. The arrow cross symbol had other ideological implications, including a desire to nullify the Treaty of Trianon, and expand the Hungarian state in all cardinal directions, out to the borders of the former Kingdom of Hungary.

== Ideology ==
The party proposed in the early 1940s to replace the Hungarian national flag with the historical Árpád stripes, opposed to the liberal influence from the French Revolution that inspired the red-white-green tricolor from the Hungarian Revolution of 1848.

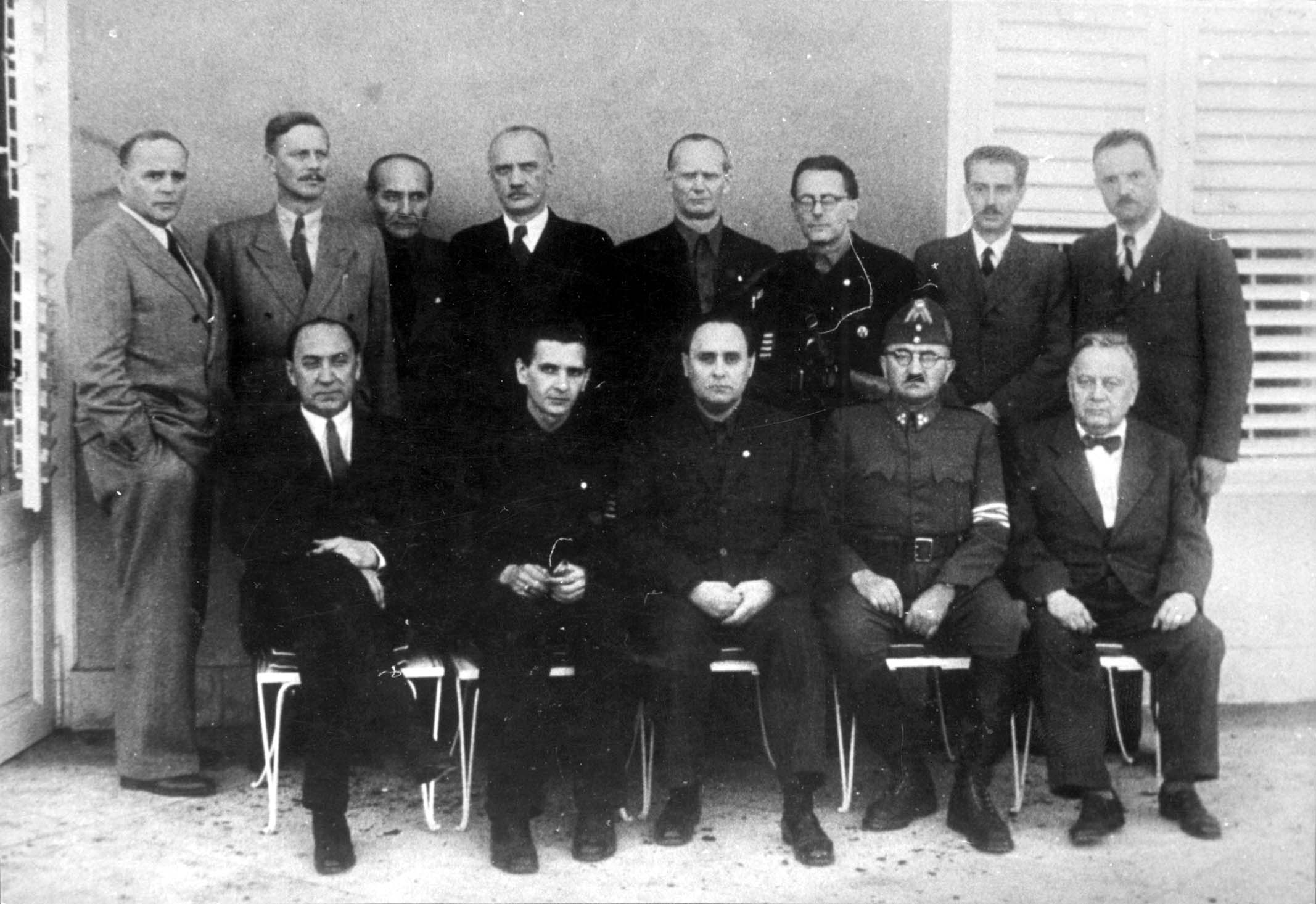
Ministers of the Arrow Cross Party government. Ferenc Szálasi is in the middle of the front row.

The party's ideology was similar to those of Nazism and fascism and it combined aspects of those ideologies with Hungarian Turanism, forming an ideology which Ferenc Szálasi called "Hungarism". It combined nationalism, the promotion of agriculture, anti-capitalism, (Note: The Arrow Cross Party held anti-feudal, anti-capitalist and anti-socialist beliefs. They supported land reform and militarism and drew most of its support from the ranks of the Royal Hungarian Army.) anti-communism and a special type of anti-Semitism, called a-Semitism. In a series of four books on Hungarism, Szálasi distinguished a-Semitism, which called for a society that should be completely free of Jews, from anti-Semitism, which, he argued, would nominally allow Jews to exist in a particular society with limited rights. He argued that a-Semitism was not opposed to the existence of Jews per se, instead, it regarded their existence as being incompatible with European society. Szálasi extended this argument to Arabs, and he also extended it to the whole "semitic race".

The party and its leader originally opposed German geopolitical ambitions, so Hitler was slow to accept Szálasi's connationalism, the support of nationalist movements within their historical territories and spheres of influence on the grounds of historical evidence of cultural dominance. This concept was poorly understood by the Germans because it combined nationalism and internationalism, the cooperation of nationalist movements. Consequently, the party judged Jews in racial as well as religious terms. It is believed that Jews were incapable of being integrated into any society that was outside the place and culture of their historical origins. Although the Arrow Cross Party was certainly far more anti-semitic than the Horthy regime was, it differed from the German Nazi Party. It was also more economically radical than other fascist movements were, and advocated some workers' rights and land reforms.

=== Geopolitical doctrine ===
The geopolitical vision of the Arrow Cross Party was deeply rooted in a mythologized conception of Hungarian exceptionalism, predicated on the belief that Hungarians constituted a master race due to their unique ethno-cultural synthesis of Western and Eastern elements. Drawing upon the legacy of Turanism and Hungarian ethnogenesis theories, Arrow Cross ideologues asserted that Hungary’s ancient Asian roots, particularly its connections to nomadic steppe cultures, combined with its historical integration into the Christian and European civilizational sphere, endowed the Hungarian people with a hybrid vigor that surpassed the limitations of either tradition in isolation.

This alleged fusion of martial Asiatic dynamism and European rationalism was presented not merely as a cultural curiosity but as the biological and spiritual foundation for Hungary’s claim to geopolitical preeminence. In this framework, Hungary was envisioned as a bridge between civilizations, uniquely positioned to rise as a world power capable of leading a new hierarchical order grounded in ethnonational superiority. Such beliefs, while framed in the language of national destiny and historical necessity, mirrored broader fascist trends that sacralized racial purity or hybridity as instruments of geopolitical renewal and imperial ambition.

== Rise to power ==
=== Origins ===
The roots of Arrow Cross influence can be traced to the antisemitism that followed the communist putsch, the creation of the Hungarian Soviet Republic, and Red Terror during the spring and summer of 1919. Most communist leaders, such as Tibor Szamuely, were from Jewish families. Béla Kun, the republic's leader and instigator of the Terror, had a secular Jewish father and a mother who, despite converting to the Reformed Church of Hungary, was still seen as being a Jew. Many antisemitic writers before the Second World War, such as Léon de Poncins, used this fact to propagate the Judeo-Masonic conspiracy theory. The Hungarian Soviet Republic's policies were credited by some anti-communists as being part of a "Judeo-Bolshevist conspiracy."

After the Soviet republic was overthrown in August 1919, conservative authoritarians under the leadership of Admiral Miklós Horthy seized control. Many Hungarian military officers took part in the counter-reprisals known as the White Terror – parts of which were directed at Jews. Although the White Guard was officially suppressed, many of its most prevalent members went underground and formed the core membership of a spreading nationalist antisemitic movement.

=== Growth ===
During the 1930s, the Arrow Cross began to dominate Budapest's working class neighborhoods, defeating the Social Democrats. The Social Democrats did not contest elections effectively, and they were forced into a pact with the conservative Horthy regime in order to prevent their abolition. The Arrow Cross recruited from the poorest members of society, including the chronically unemployed, alcoholics, ex-convicts, prisoners, rapists, and the uneducated. These members later committed some of the most brutal crimes against Jews, intellectuals, socialists, and other civilians. The Hungarian historian Andrea Pető has argued that the popular image of the Arrow Cross as made of the dregs of society from the lower classes was a way of avoiding any sense of guilt over the massacres committed by the Arrow Cross. Pető maintains the image of the Arrow Cross made up of misfits and criminals living in poverty was a way of suggesting normal people were not involved in the Arrow Cross.

World War II propaganda poster for the party – the text reads "Despite it all..!"

The Arrow Cross subscribed to the Nazi ideology of "master races", which, in Szálasi's view, included the Hungarians and Germans, and also supported the concept of an order based on the power of the strongest – what Szálasi called a "brutally realistic étatism". But its espousal of territorial claims under the banner of a "Greater Hungary" and Hungarian values ("Hungarizmus" or "Hungarianism") clashed with Nazi ambitions, delaying Hitler's endorsement of that party by several years.

The German Foreign Office instead endorsed the pro-German Hungarian National Socialist Party, which had some supporters among ethnic Germans. Before World War II, the Arrow Cross were not proponents of the racial antisemitism of the Nazis, but utilized traditional stereotypes and prejudices to gain votes among voters both in Budapest and the countryside. Nonetheless, the constant bickering among these diverse fascist groups prevented the Arrow Cross Party from gaining more support and power.

The Arrow Cross obtained most of its support from a disparate coalition of military officers, soldiers, nationalists, and agricultural workers. It was only one of several similar fascist factions in Hungary, but it was by far the most prominent, through effective recruiting. In the only election it participated in, in May 1939, the party won 15% of the vote and 29 seats in the Hungarian Parliament, but this was only superficially impressive as most Hungarians were not permitted to vote. The Arrow Cross became one of the most powerful parties in Hungary before being banned by the Horthy government at the outbreak of World War II, forcing it to operate clandestinely.

=== Nazi support and killings of Jews ===
In 1944, the Arrow Cross Party's fortunes abruptly reversed when Hitler lost patience with Horthy and his moderate prime minister, Miklós Kállay, for their reluctance to fully toe the Nazi line. In March 1944, the Germans invaded and occupied Hungary, which resulted in Kállay fleeing, and being replaced by a Nazi proxy, Döme Sztójay, who quickly legalized the Arrow Cross.

During the spring and summer of 1944, more than 400,000 Jews were driven into centralised ghettos and then deported from the Hungarian countryside to death camps by the Nazis, with the enthusiastic assistance of the Hungarian Interior Ministry and its gendarmerie (the csendőrség), both of which had members closely linked to the Arrow Cross. Budapest Jews were forced into Yellow Star Houses, approximately 2,000 single-building mini-ghettos identified by a yellow Star of David at the entrance. In August 1944, before deportations from Budapest began, Horthy used what remaining influence he had to stop them and force the radical antisemites out of his government.

As the summer progressed, and with the Allied and Soviet armies closing in on central Europe, the ability of the Nazis to devote resources to Hungary's "Jewish Solution" waned, but they still carried out many massacres. Jews were often rounded up on the streets by Arrow Cross men, and their standard procedure was to take children away from their parents, then killing or beating any parent or child who protested. The Arrow Cross repeatedly organized mass murders next to the Danube, shooting people in the head, with the bodies falling into the river. To save ammunition, their favorite method was to tie the waists of three people together with wire and shoot only the middle person, who would fall forward into the river drowning the other two as the weight of the corpse dragged them to the bottom of the Danube.

It has been estimated that during the autumn of 1944, there were no more than 4,000 members of the Arrow Cross in Budapest, yet despite this, they were able to terrorize the city's population of a million. Their methods eventually became too sickening even for the German military, whose commander General Karl Pfeffer-Wildenbruch ordered his troops not to take part in the killings. On the other hand, the German envoy to Hungary Edmund Veesenmayer received orders from Berlin to provide as much assistance as he could to the Arrow Cross in the killing of Jews. Eventually, Szálasi became concerned about the impression that neutral diplomats were forming of his government and ordered that the killings be undertaken with more discretion. The country's national police commissioner, Pál Hódosy, concurred, "The problem is not that the Jews are being murdered... the trouble is the method. The bodies must be made to disappear, not put out on the streets." This view was shared by parliamentarian Károlyl Maróthy, who said "Something must be done to stop the death rattle going on in the ditches day and night... the population must not be able to see them dying"

About 10% of the Arrow Cross members convicted of war crimes after the war were women, and the majority of those women were middle-aged. Of those women convicted, 21% were born before 1896, 50% were born between 1896-1914 and the rest were born after 1914. Of those women convicted, 46% were housewives. About 7% of the women convicted came from the criminal underworld, and the motivation for these women was the same as the men from the underworld, namely to kill Jews in order to loot their assets. Contrary to the popular image of the Arrow Cross as a working class movement, the majority of the female Arrow Cross members convicted of war crimes came from the middle class.

== Arrow Cross rule ==
Jewish victims of Arrow Cross men in the court of the Dohány Street Synagogue

In October 1944, Horthy negotiated a cease-fire with the Soviets and ordered Hungarian troops to lay down their arms. In response, Nazi Germany launched the covert Operation Panzerfaust, which took Horthy into "protective custody" in Germany and forced him to abdicate. Szálasi was made "Leader of the Nation" and prime minister of an Arrow Cross-dominated "Government of National Unity" the same day.

By this time, Soviet and Romanian forces had pushed deep into Hungarian territory. As a result, the Szálasi government's authority was limited to an ever-narrowing band of territory around Budapest. In this context, Arrow Cross rule was short and brutal. In under three months, their death squads killed as many as 38,000 Hungarian Jews. Arrow Cross officers helped Adolf Eichmann re-start deportations from which the Jews of Budapest had thus far been spared, sending some 80,000 Jews out of the city on slave labour details and many more straight to death camps. Virtually all Jewish males of conscription age were already serving as slave labour for the Hungarian Army's Forced Labor Battalions. Most died, including many who were murdered as they were returning home after the end of the fighting.

Red Army troops reached the outskirts of Budapest in December 1944, and the siege of the city began. Arrow Cross members and the Germans may have conspired to destroy the Budapest ghetto, but any evidence remains disputed. Days before fleeing, Arrow Cross Interior Minister Gábor Vajna ordered that streets and squares named for Jews be renamed. As control of the city's institutions weakened, the Arrow Cross trained their guns on the most helpless possible targets, including patients in the city's two Jewish hospitals on Maros Street and Bethlen Square, remaining women and children, and residents in the Jewish poorhouse on Alma Road. As order collapsed, Arrow Cross members continued their attacks on Jews so that the majority of Budapest's Jews were only saved by the heroic efforts of a handful of Jewish leaders and foreign diplomats, most famously Sweden's special envoy Raoul Wallenberg, the Papal Nuncio Monsignor Angelo Rotta, Swiss Consul Carl Lutz, Spanish Consul Ángel Sanz Briz and the Italian cattle trader Giorgio Perlasca.

The Arrow Cross government effectively fell at the end of January 1945, when the Soviet Army took Pest and the Axis forces retreated across the Danube to Buda. Szálasi had escaped from Budapest on 11 December 1944, taking with him the Hungarian royal crown, while Arrow Cross members and German forces continued to fight a rear-guard action in the far west of Hungary until the end of the war in April 1945.

== Post-war developments ==
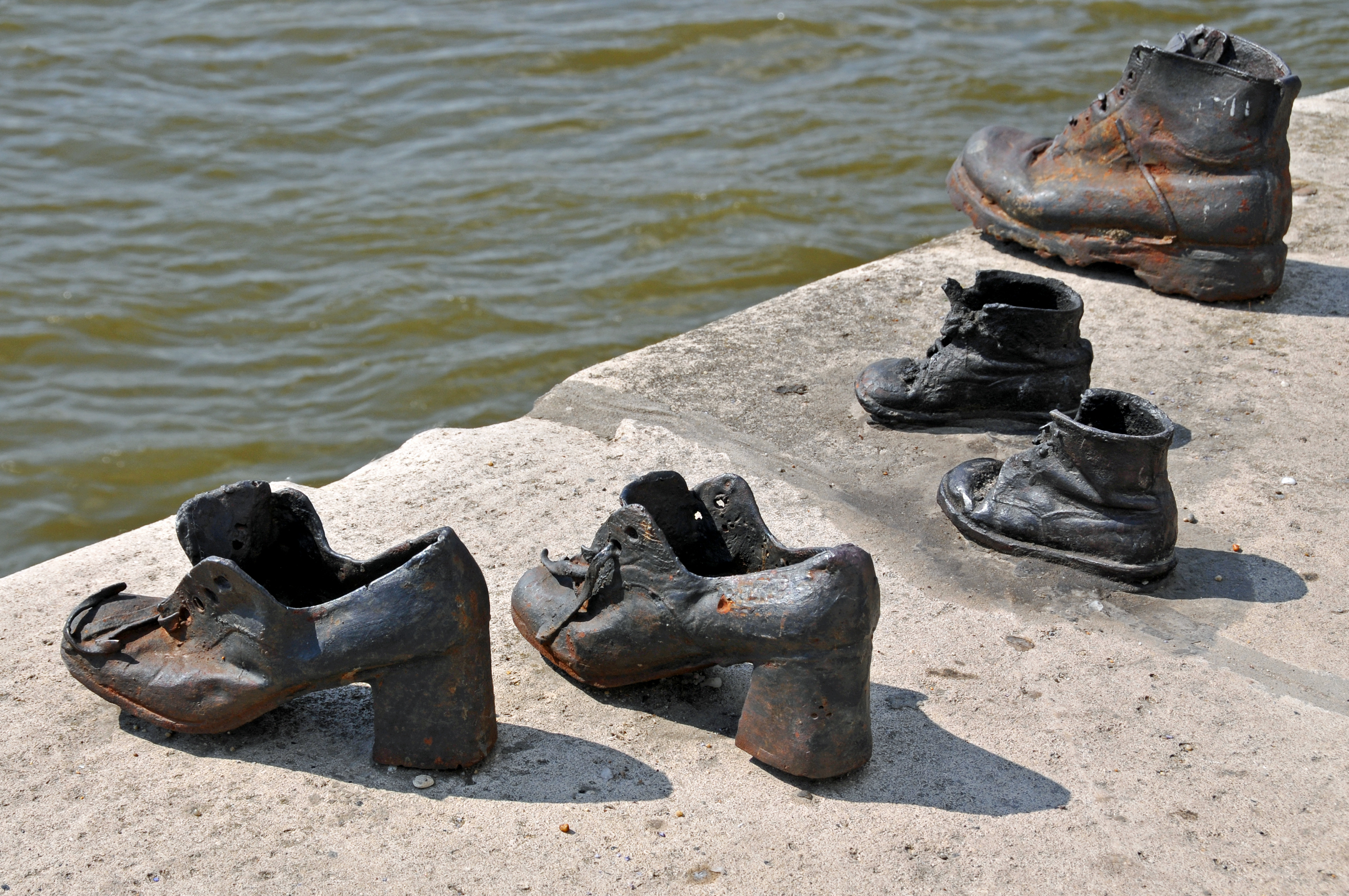
The "Shoes on the Danube Bank" memorial in Budapest, conceived by film director Can Togay with sculptor Gyula Pauer to honor those Jews who were murdered by fascist Arrow Cross militiamen in Budapest during World War II.

After the war, many Arrow Cross leaders were captured and tried for war crimes, and no fewer than 6,200 indictments for murder were served against Arrow Cross men in just a few months. Some Arrow Cross officials were executed, including Szálasi. A memorial which was created by Gyula Pauer, Hungarian sculptor, and Can Togay in 2005 on the bank of the Danube River in Budapest honors the Jews who were shot there by Arrow Cross militiamen, between 1944 and 1945. The victims were forced to remove their shoes, all of which were confiscated later, and then shot so that their bodies would fall into the river.

In 2006, a former high-ranking member, Lajos Polgár, was found in Melbourne, Australia. He died of natural causes in July of that year after the war crimes case against him was dropped. To some extent, the ideology of the Arrow Cross has resurfaced in recent years, with the neofascist Hungarian Welfare Association being prominent in reviving Szálasi's "Hungarizmus" through its monthly magazine, Magyartudat ("Hungarian Awareness") but "Hungarism" remains a fringe element in modern Hungarian politics, and the Hungarian Welfare Association has dissolved.

== Anthem ==
=== Lyrics ===
Hungarian original

Ébredj, magyar! Az ősi föld veszélyben!
Elvész a fajtánk, hogyha nem merünk!
Vélünk az Isten száz csatán keresztül,
Nem veszhetünk el, csak mi győzhetünk!

Rabokká váltunk ősapáink földjén
De már a hajnal jön, hasadni kezd!
Ha összefog most, magyar a magyarral,
Győzelemre visz majd a nyilaskereszt,
Szálasi Ferenc!

English translation

Wake up, Hungarians! The olden land is in danger!
Our nation will perish if we do not fight back!
God is with us even through a hundred battles,
We cannot lose; we can only prevail!

We became captives in the land of our forefathers
But morning is rising; dawn is starting to break!
If we unite now, Hungarian with Hungarian,
The Arrow Cross will lead us to victory,
Ferenc Szálasi!

== Flag gallery ==
(1937–1942)

(1942–1945)

(1942–1945)

== Electoral results ==
=== National Assembly ===
Election	Votes			Seats		Rank	Government	Leader of the national list
Election	#	%	±pp	#	+/−	Rank	Government	Leader of the national list
1939	530,405	14.4%	▲14.4	29 / 260	▲29	3rd	in opposition	Ferenc Szálasi

== See also ==
- András Kun
- Antisemitism in contemporary Hungary
- Hungarian National Socialist Party
- The Holocaust in Hungary
- Hungary during the Second World War
- Music Box
- The Fifth Seal
