= Simonyi =

Simonyi is a surname of Hungarian origin. Notable people with the surname include:

- András Simonyi, Hungarian diplomat
- André Simonyi, Hungarian-French football player
- Charles Simonyi, software developer and space tourist
- Károly Simonyi, Hungarian electrical engineer, father of Charles
- Lajos Simonyi, Hungarian politician
- Sándor Simonyi-Semadam, Hungarian politician, lawyer and Prime Minister

== See also ==
- Shimony
- Simony (disambiguation)
- Simoni
- Shimoni
