= Simony (disambiguation) =

Simony is the act of selling church offices and roles.

Simony may also refer to:

- Friedrich Simony (1813–1896), Austrian geographer and Alpine researcher
  - Simony Hut, an Alpine club hut at the foot of the Hoher Dachstein in Austria
  - Simonyspitzen, two mountain summits in the Venediger Group of the Austrian Central Alps
- Simony (singer), a Brazilian singer
- Hungarian name of the Slovak town Partizánske

== See also ==
- Simon (disambiguation)
- Simonyi, Hungarian surname
- Simoni, Italian surname
- Shimoni, Hebrew surname
