= Eric C. Anderson =

American entrepreneur and aerospace engineer

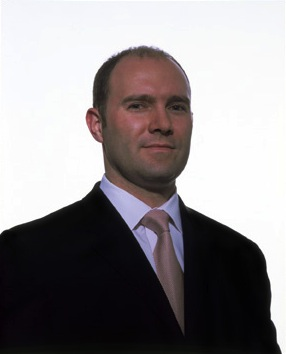
- Born: 1974 (age 51–52)
- Education: University of Virginia (BS)
- Occupations: Chairman of Space Adventures, Ltd.; CEO of Intentional Software Corporation; Co-Founder of Planetary Power, Inc.
- Years active: 1996–present
- Spouse: Inessa Anderson
- Children: 4

Eric C. Anderson (born 1974) is an American entrepreneur and aerospace engineer. He is the co-founder and chairman of Space Adventures Ltd., the first commercial spaceflight company, which has arranged for eight missions for privately funded individuals to the International Space Station since 2001. Anderson is widely credited as having established the market for commercial spaceflight. He is also a founding partner of Space Angels Network, CEO of Intentional Software Corporation, co-founder and chairman of Planetary Power, Inc., co-founder and former co-chairman of Planetary Resources and chairman of Personal.com and Booster Fuels.

== Early life and education ==
Anderson was raised in Littleton, Colorado, by his father, an American real estate entrepreneur, and his Argentine mother.

He attended Columbine High School and graduated in 1992. Early in high school, Anderson intended to join the Air Force as a pilot, with the goal of eventually becoming an astronaut. However, his diagnosed myopia would have prevented him from being able to pass the physical examinations to enter the Air Force. Anderson decided to attend the University of Virginia and major in aerospace engineering and computer science in order to study space technologies and continue his interest in space exploration. At the university, he began a chapter of Students for the Exploration and Development of Space. In 1996, he graduated magna cum laude with a B.S. in aerospace engineering and computer science, and first in his class in the university's engineering school.

== Career ==
=== Early career ===
In 1994, while Anderson was at the University of Virginia, he interned for the founder and chairman of the X Prize Foundation, Peter Diamandis, in Washington, D.C. While there he helped organize the Ansari X Prize, a competition for the first private-sector crewed space flight, and projects for Zero Gravity Corporation (ZERO-G). The following year, Anderson was selected as Virginia's representative, and one of approximately 24 undergraduates chosen to take part, in the NASA Academy's student summer program. During the program he carried out research at Goddard Space Flight Center and met key individuals involved in the aerospace industry, including several astronauts, then-NASA Administrator Dan Goldin and the CEOs of Lockheed Martin and Orbital Sciences Corporation.

Anderson's first job after graduating was as an engineer and business developer at Analytical Graphics, an aerospace software company based in Philadelphia. His role with the company involved developing software for space missions. In 1997, Anderson founded Starport.com, a website that provided the public with information about space travel. He sold the website to Space.com in 2000.

=== Space Adventures ===
==== Foundation ====
While Anderson was at the NASA Academy program in 1995, he began thinking seriously about space tourism, and in particular decided that NASA would not be able to develop a program that could take civilians into space at a "reasonable cost". In collaboration with Peter Diamandis, with whom Anderson had interned in 1994, and adventure travel operator Mike McDowell, Anderson developed the initial idea to create a space tourism company, Space Adventures.

He co-founded Space Adventures with Diamandis and McDowell in 1997, initially funded by $250,000 raised from Diamandis, McDowell and other investors. Anderson became the company's founding director and vice president, and set up company operations in his townhouse in Arlington, Virginia, making Space Adventures the world's first space tourism company.

==== Development of the business ====
Anderson initially arranged for clients to experience flights to "the edge of space" in MiG-25 fighter jets, airplane flights to experience weightlessness, and tours of Russian Soyuz launches in Kazakhstan. He continued to look for opportunities to place clients on an actual space flight, including commissioning a report from the Russian Federal Space Agency to study whether the Soyuz space vehicle could transport tourists to the International Space Station (ISS). In 1999, he reached an agreement with the Russian space agency to purchase seats on the Soyuz on behalf of private citizens. He sold the first seat to money manager Dennis Tito for $20 million. In 2001, Tito was part of a group of astronauts who were launched into orbit and visited the ISS, the first time a private citizen had paid to fly to orbit.

==== Commercial market for space travel ====
In his work with Space Adventures, Anderson has been widely credited as the first to monetize spaceflight and demonstrate the viability of a commercial market for space travel, by proving there is demand for space tourism. In 2008, Smart CEO reported that Anderson's company was "the only firm in the world to have sold space flights that have actually been realized". By 2011, Anderson has sold nearly half a billion in space missions, and his company had arranged for all seven missions of private citizens, including Dennis Tito, Guy Laliberte and Charles Simonyi to visit the ISS.

Anderson has stated that he sees tourism as a catalyst for the commercialization of space through encouraging development of cheaper transportation into space, which will eventually allow humanity to develop and colonize space, including the development of natural resources beyond earth. In an interview with Smart CEO, he said that he believes that it is "imperative" to explore space for humanity's long-term survival.

=== Other roles ===
In addition to his role as chairman of Space Adventures, Anderson holds a number of other professional positions. He is the chairman of Planetary Power, Inc., a renewable energy company he co-founded in 2007, which focuses on developing affordable renewable energy technology. Anderson is also the president and CEO of Intentional Software Corporation, a software development company founded by Charles Simonyi that develops solutions to make creating applications more intuitive and accessible to people who are not experienced in computer programming. He joined Intentional as its president in September 2010, to work with Simonyi on marketing his intentional programming method. Later that year, on December 15, 2010, he was chosen as the next chairman of the board of the Commercial Spaceflight Federation, an organization that promotes the development of the commercial spaceflight industry. Anderson is also the co-founder and former co-chairman of Planetary Resources, Inc., a 2010s company that developed technology with the aim of carrying out exploration of asteroids and mining them for resources including platinum and other precious metals.

=== Speaking appearances and writing ===
Anderson has appeared as a guest speaker and lecturer at conferences including the World Economic Forum in Davos, Switzerland, the Forbes Global CEO Conference, and a TEDGlobal where he spoke about how mining asteroids could create profit from space travel. He has also contributed to two books, Kids Who Think Outside the Box by Stephanie Lerner and The Space Tourist’s Handbook, a guide to space tourism that he co-authored.

== Philanthropy and organizations ==
Anderson is a board member of the X Prize Foundation. He is also a trustee of the Koshka Foundation and Seattle's Museum of Flight and a member of the Board of Governors for the National Space Society.

In 2008, he became a member of the Young Global Leaders of the World Economic Forum. He is also a member of the Young Presidents' Organization.

== Honors and awards ==
Anderson has received a number of awards and honors during his career. In 1996, he was named by USA Today as one of its US Top 40 University Graduates. In 2006, he received the University of Virginia Engineering Foundation’s Outstanding Young Engineering Graduate Award, the National Space Society and Space Tourism Society’s ORBIT Award and the World Technology Network’s "World Technology Award" in its space category. In 2010 he was named one of Ernst & Young's entrepreneurs of the year.

== Personal life ==
Anderson lives in Bellevue, Washington with his wife Inessa and their four children.
