= Yoshi Mobility =

Live video inspection company

- Type: Private
- Founded: 2015
- Founders: Bryan Frist; Nick Alexander; Dan Hunter; David Gobaud
- Headquarters: Nashville, Tennessee
- Services: Vehicle Inspections
- Website: yoshimobility.com

Yoshi Mobility is a live-video vehicle inspection platform for transportation networks based in Nashville, Tennessee.

The company previously provided mobile fuel delivery, EV charging, and maintenance to private cars and fleet vehicles.

== History ==
Yoshi Mobility was founded in 2015 in San Francisco, California as a direct-to-consumer mobile fueling service so drivers would not have to go to the gas station. Two Harvard Business School students started the company: Bryan Frist (the son of former Tennessee U.S. Senator Bill Frist) and Nick Alexander, as well as Harvard Law graduate David Gobaud and Stanford engineer Dan Hunter. They were accepted into the startup accelerator Y Combinator's summer cohort in 2016.

In 2016, Yoshi's business model attracted attention because of safety concerns with transporting gasoline in the backs of pickup trucks, particularly with the office of the state fire marshal in California. Yoshi told The Guardian that it was "using DOT-certified equipment" and had also had the highway patrol inspect its vehicles. Yoshi also informed Bloomberg that it limited its tank size to comply with the International Fire Code.

The company provided emergency response support in the local community during the Colonial Pipeline leak in September 2016 and resulting gas shortage in Nashville, Tennessee. Entrepreneur reported that Yoshi fueled vehicles for employees and volunteers caring for 430 Alive Hospice patients in 12 counties. Yoshi charged the nonprofit for the gas, but waived all the fees. In 2021, Yoshi moved its headquarters to Nashville.

== Funding ==
Yoshi raised a $15 million Series A in 2018 from backers including General Motors and ExxonMobil, among others, with The Washington Post reporting that this was ExxonMobil's first startup investment. In 2024, Yoshi closed a $26 million Series C from backers including General Motors Ventures and Bridgestone Americas, bringing its total funding to more than $60 million.

== Services ==
Yoshi started as a service where hazmat-certified technicians fueled individual customer vehicles in parking lots. They installed a magnetic fuel vault on compatible car fuel doors so that participating customers would not have to remember to leave their gas caps open. Publications including Business Insider, The Guardian, and The Washington Post described Yoshi Mobility as part of the growing "Uber for gas" movement in the U.S., along with competitors like Booster Fuels, Filld, and others.

In November 2024, the company announced in a press release that it was changing its focus from gas delivery to live-video vehicle inspections with gig economy customers such as Uber and Turo, as well as mobile EV charging and preventative maintenance. At the end of 2025, Yoshi's website focused completely on vehicle inspections.
