= Alfréd Drasche-Lázár =

Hungarian diplomat (1875–1949)

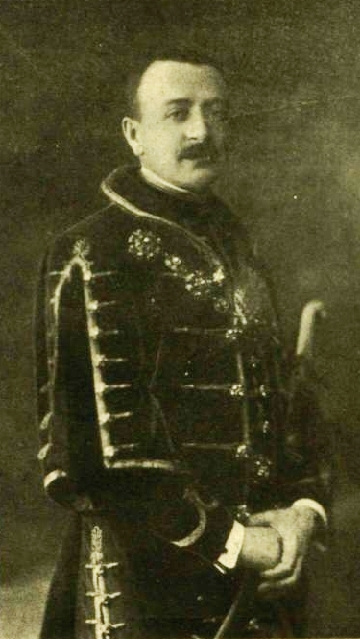

Deputy Minister of Foreign Affairs
- In office October 1918 – December 1922
- President: Miklós Horthy
- Preceded by: (position created)
- Succeeded by: Tibor Scitovszky

Personal details
- Born: Alfréd Artúr Béla Drasche-Lázár; 15 June 1875; Dorog, Hungary
- Died: 28 August 1949 (aged 74); Meyerhofen, Austria
- Occupation: diplomat · writer · journalist · playwright · politician

Alfréd Artúr Béla Drasche-Lázár (15 June 1875 – 28 August 1949) was a Hungarian diplomat, writer, journalist, playwright, and politician.

From 1918 to 1922, Drasche-Lázár served as Deputy Minister of Foreign Affairs for the Kingdom of Hungary. He was one of two co-signatories of the Treaty of Trianon for Hungary, alongside Ágost Benárd.

== Early life ==
Alfréd Artúr Béla Drasche-Lázár was born on 15 June 1875 in the town of Dorog in the Kingdom of Hungary. His father, Arthur Drasche (1850–1940), was a successful Flemish industrialist, and his mother, Ilona Lázár, was of Transylvanian descent.

== Political career ==
In 1900, Drasche-Lázár worked as a draftsman for Kálmán Széll. Between 1904 and 1913, he was employed at the Ministry of Foreign Affairs, and later worked at the Ministry of Finance. In 1913, he began working in the Chancellery of the Prime Minister as a ministerial advisor to László Lukács. Drasche-Lázár was then promoted to chief of the Chancellery's press office by István Tisza in 1914, and continued this job until the outbreak of World War I in 1918.

Following the Aster Revolution in October 1918, Drasche-Lázár was made Deputy Minister of Foreign Affairs by Prime Minister Mihály Károlyi, who also served as Minister of Foreign Affairs.

In June 1920, Drasche-Lázár was designated Extraordinary Envoy by Prime Minister Sándor Simonyi-Semadam and, alongside Minister of Public Welfare Ágost Benárd, was assigned to travel to the Grand Trianon in Versailles to sign the Treaty of Trianon on behalf of Hungary. The treaty saw Hungary's withdrawal from WWI and the loss of 71% of its territory.

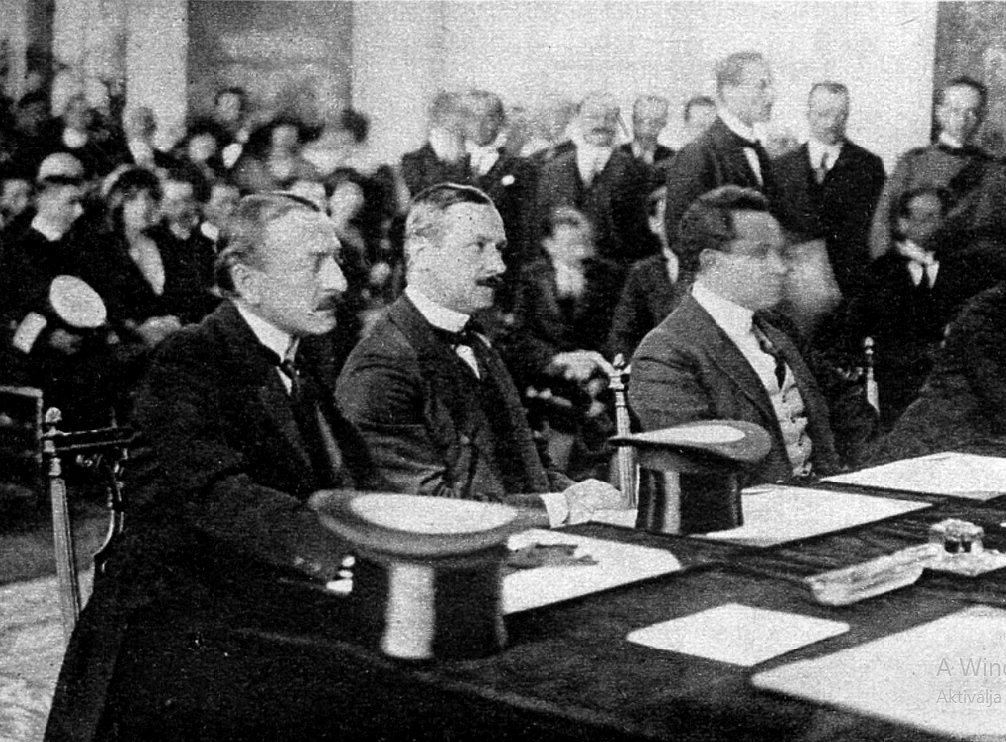
Drasche-Lázár and Ágost Benárd signing the Treaty of Trianon, 4 June 1920.

In 1922, due to cutbacks resulting from the Treaty of Trianon, the Hungarian government began downsizing its staff, resulting in many government employees being laid off. As a result, Drasche-Lázár retired from politics.

In 1930, Drasche-Lázár became the head of IBUSZ (Idegenforgalmi Beszerzési Utazási és Szállítási), a travel agency based in Budapest, and in 1932 he became the editor-in-chief of a Budapest trade union newspaper.

== Literary career ==
Throughout his literary career, Drasche-Lázár wrote twenty-one novels, three plays, and a one-act poem. He mainly wrote dramatic fiction, with historical fiction and science fiction influences.

Drasche-Lázár's literary career began in 1906 when a portfolio of short stories he had submitted appeared in the newspapers Magyar Hírlap and Pester Lloyd. He achieved further success in 1917 with the release of his novel Tűzpróba (English: Fire Test). Tűzpróba was adapted into a film in 1918 by Lux Film Factory. He wrote several plays that were performed in theaters in Budapest and Bratislava to minor acclaim. His most notable play was a 1920 operetta entitled A Délibáb Hercege (English: Prince of the Mirage) which he co-wrote with István Zágon and composer Béla Ángyán.

His novels were often criticized. His 1930 novel Amyr was reviewed by journalist Endre Illés, who called it "...a confusingly transparent story in its naive complexity...", adding "...there is nothing, no life in this Amyr. And even less literature."

== Personal life ==
Alfréd Drasche-Lázár retired to Austria in 1944, settling in the town of Mayrhofen. He died there on 28 August 1949 at the age of 74.

Drasche-Lázár married Irma Szabó (1875–1918) in February 1900. They had two daughters together.

== Works ==
=== Novels ===
- A Nő és a Kígyó és Egyéb Elbeszélések [The Woman and the Serpent and Other Stories] (1913)
- Enyém Vagy! [You Are Mine!] (1917)
- Tűzpróba [Fire Test] (1917)
- Az Az Átkozott Pénz [The Cursed Money] (1917)
- Egymás Közt [Between Each Other] (1918)
- A Kutyabőr s Egyéb Történetek [The Dog's Skin and Other Stories] (1918)
- Éva Kis Keze [Eva's Little Hand] (1919)
- Tűzkereszt [Fire Cross] (1919)
- Cicisbeo (1921)
- Tied Az Élet! [Life Is Yours!] (1922)
- Marianne Öröke [Heir of Marianne] (1923)
- Dorilas: Tizenhárom Mese Nagyok Számára [Dorilas: Thirteen Tales for Adults] (1924)
- Azaldar (1925)
- Tegnap és Ma [Yesterday and Today] (1926)
- Füst, Illat és Szerelem [Smoke, Fragrance and Love] (1927)
- 2222 (1928)
- A Titokzatos Vendégek [The Mysterious Guests] (1929)
- Kicsiny a Világ és Egyéb Elbeszélések [The World is Small and Other Stories] (1929)
- Rózsa Mária és Egyéb Elbeszélések [Rózsa Mária and Other Stories] (1929)
- Amyr (1930)
- Az Egyenes Út [The Straight Path] (1930)

=== Plays ===
- Boldogság [Happiness] (1918)
- Tűzpróba [Fire Test] (1920)
- A Délibáb Hercege [Prince of the Mirage] (1920)

=== Poems ===
- Quatrocento (1921)
