= Skat (yacht) =

German yacht built in 2002

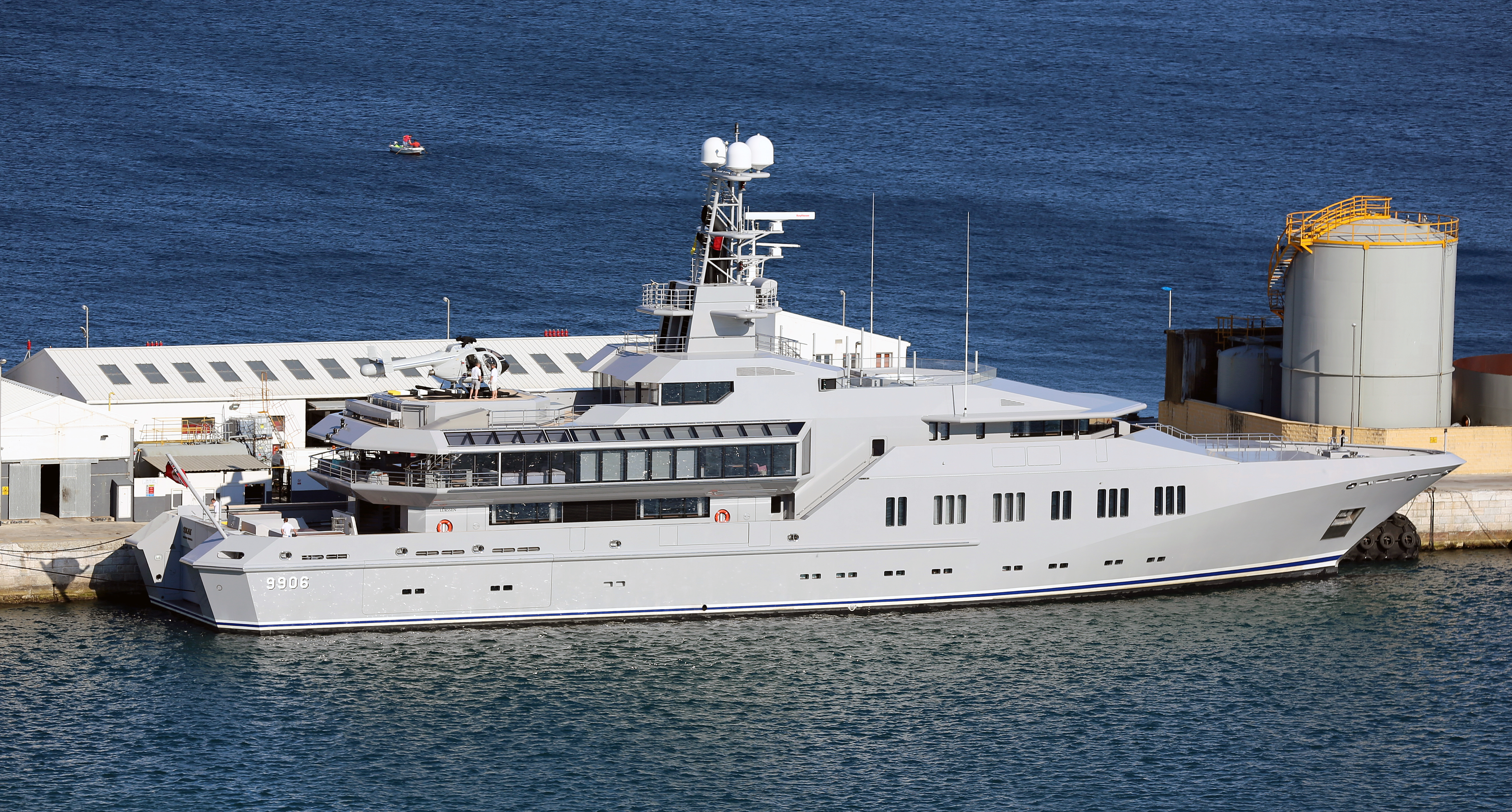
- Skat docked at North Mole, Gibraltar Harbour in 2013.

History
- Port of registry: Cayman Islands
- Builder: Lürssen Werft
- Launched: 10 March 2002
- Identification: IMO number: 1007287; MMSI number: 319741000; Callsign: ZCGS3

General characteristics
- Displacement: 1636 tonnes
- Length: 71 m (233 ft)
- Beam: 13.5 m (44 ft)
- Draft: 3.7 m (12 ft)
- Installed power: 2 × 2,000 kW (2,700 hp) MTU
- Speed: 15 knots (28 km/h; 17 mph) cruise; 17 knots (31 km/h; 20 mph) max; 13 knots (24 km/h; 15 mph) one engine
- Capacity: 10 guests
- Crew: 16

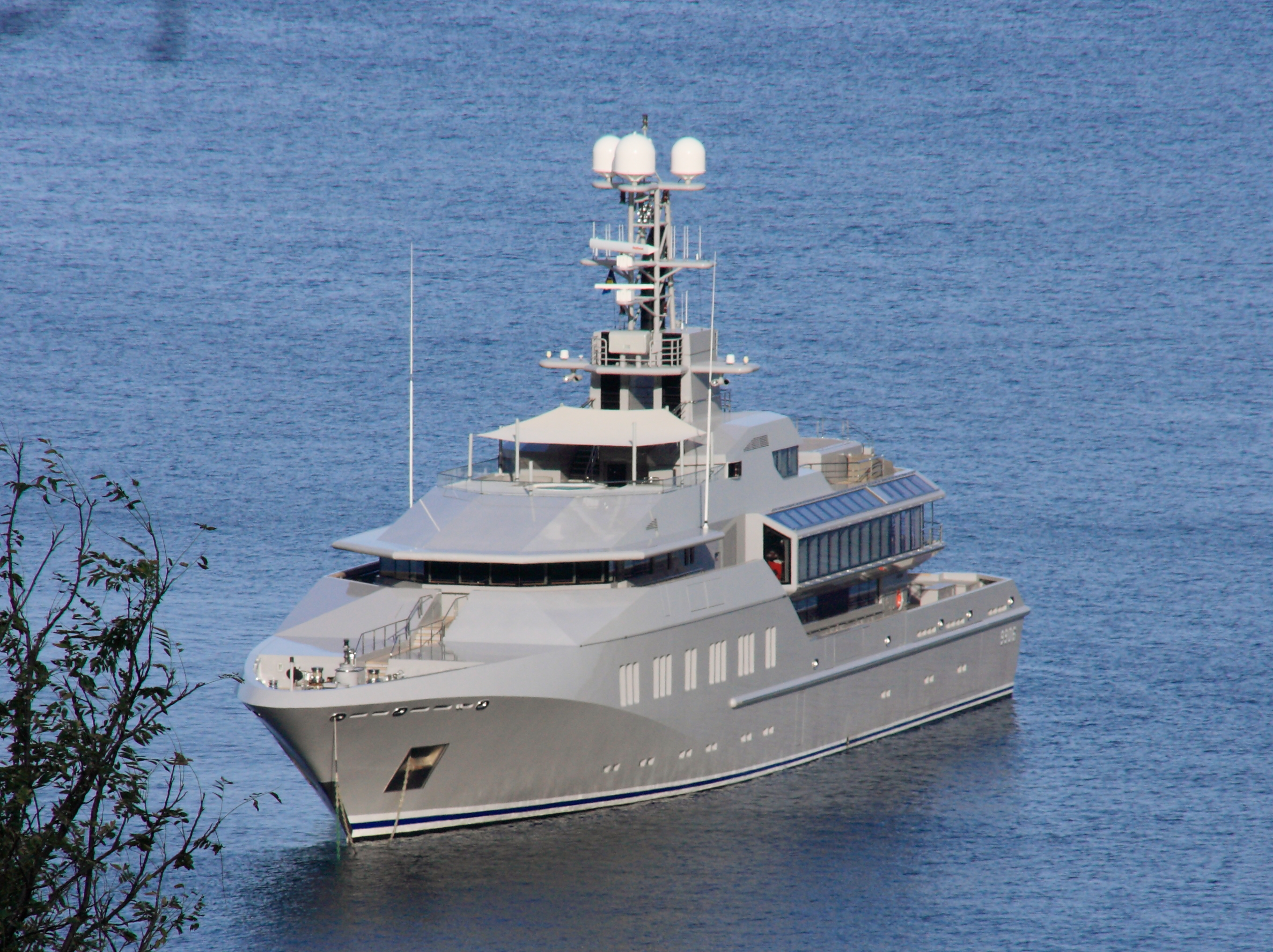
Skat in Pitons Bay, St Lucia, 21 April 2011

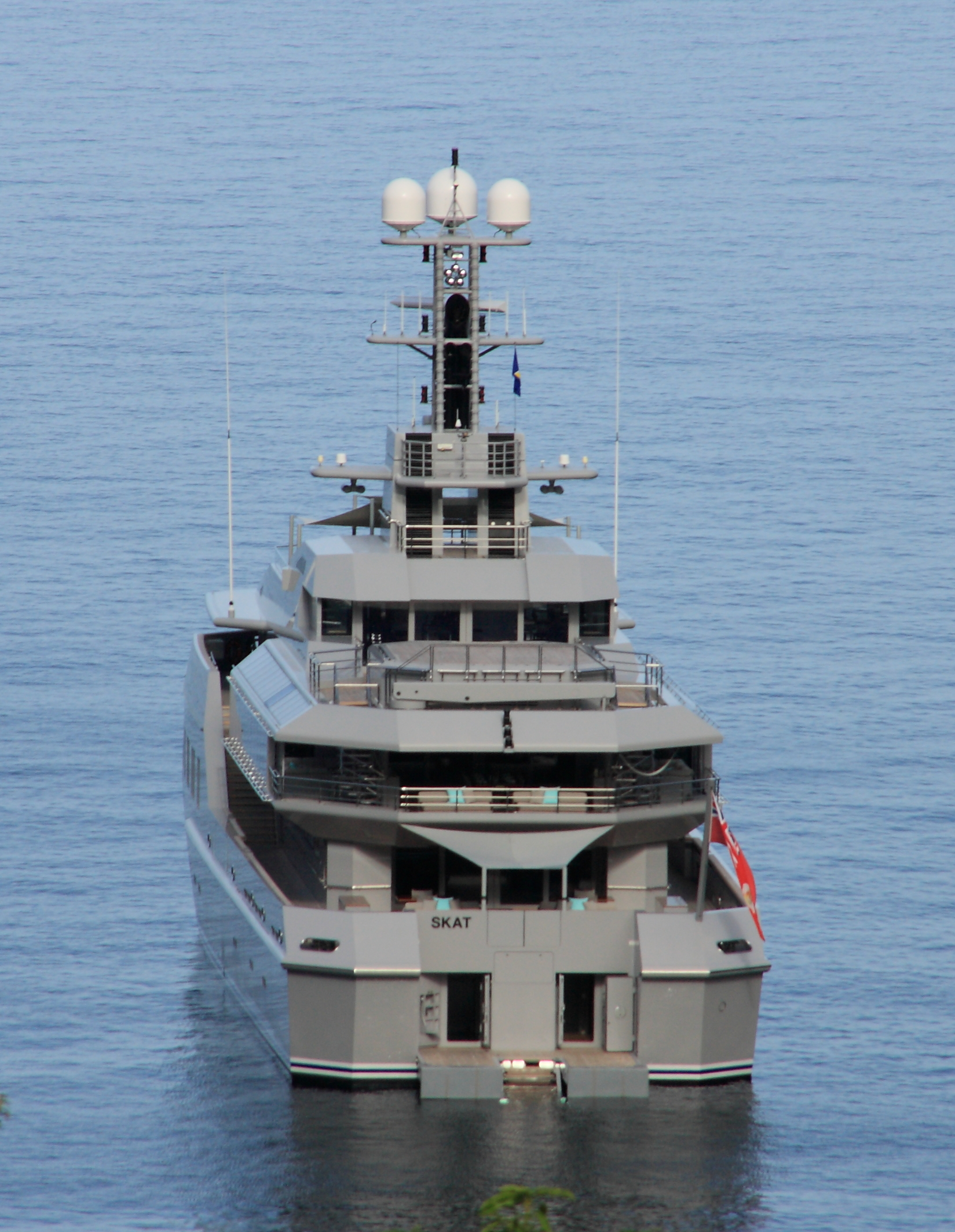
Skat in Pitons Bay, St Lucia, 21 April 2011

Skat is a luxury yacht built by Lürssen of Bremen, Germany as project 9906, a number prominently displayed on the hull in a typeface matching that of military vessels. The project started in November 1999 and the yacht launched in 2002. The owner was Charles Simonyi, a former Software Engineer from Microsoft and the fifth space tourist. The yacht is 71 metres (233 ft) long.

Simonyi once had a Danish girlfriend who called him skat, literally "treasure", a common term of endearment similar to "honey" in English.

== General specifications ==
- Hull: Steel hull, aluminum superstructure
- Fuel: 240,000 litres (53,000 imp gal; 63,000 US gal)
- Water: 62,000 litres (14,000 imp gal; 16,000 US gal)
- Designer: Espen Oeino
- Interior designer: Marco Zanini
- Stylist: Espen Oeino

== Features ==
- Elevator serving all four decks
- Leisure platform with Jacuzzi
- A gymnasium located centrally under the mast
- Helipad on the upper aft deck servicing a McDonnell Douglas 500N Helicopter
- Observation platform with helm control halfway up the central mast.
- Two tenders
- Two jet skis
- Motorcycles and accompanying lift

The yacht can achieve a speed of 13 knots (24 km/h; 15 mph) on just one engine. A cooling pump integrated into the gearboxes assures safe operation on one engine by pumping oil through the idle gearbox. The shaft of the idle engine can be disengaged, leaving the idle propeller and shaft to freewheel.

== See also ==
- List of motor yachts by length
- Yacht
- Yachting
