= Sándor Simonyi-Semadam =

Hungarian politician

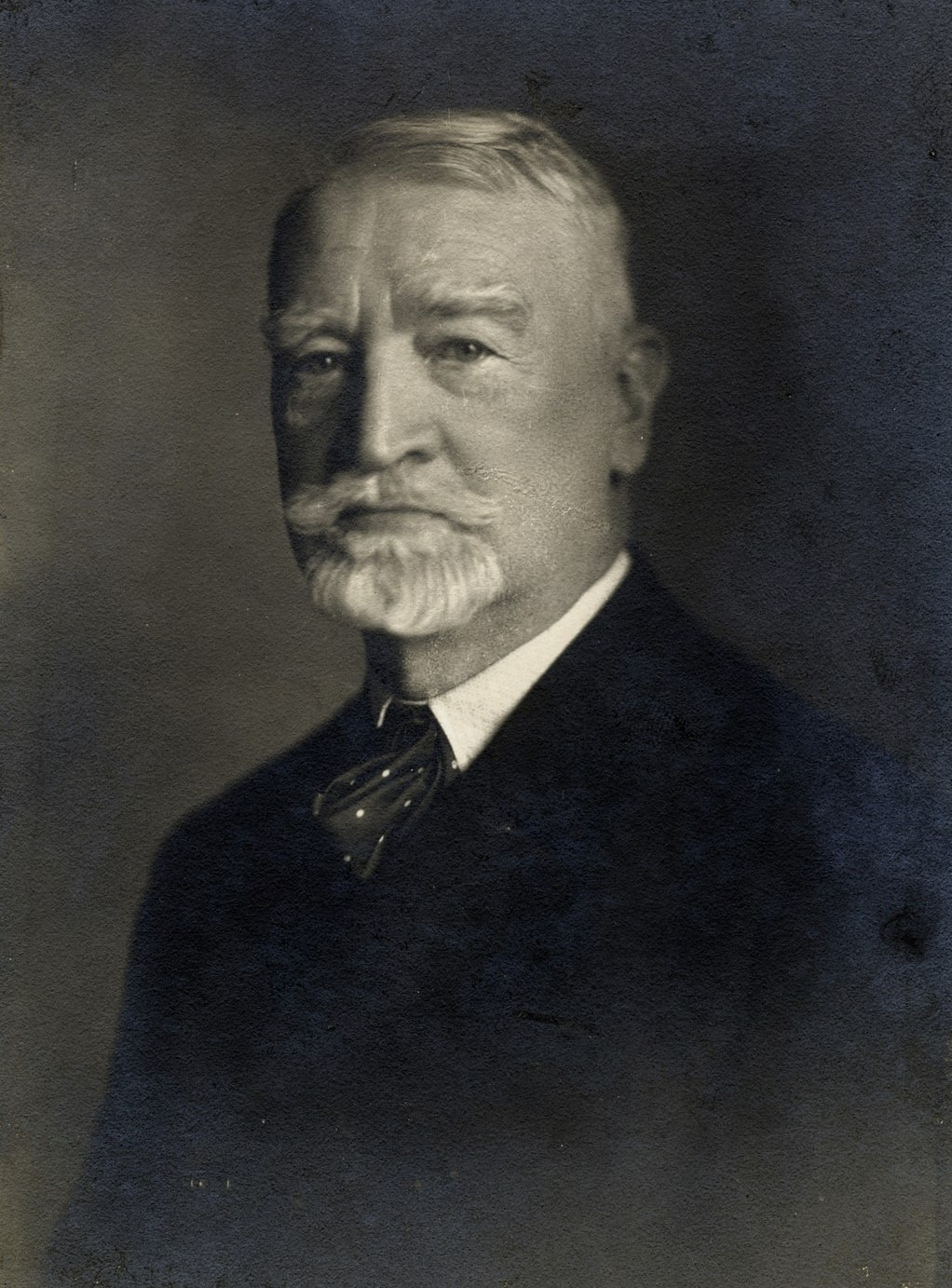
- Simonyi-Semadam in 1920

Prime Minister of Hungary
- In office 15 March 1920 – 19 July 1920
- Regent: Miklós Horthy
- Preceded by: Károly Huszár
- Succeeded by: Pál Teleki

Member of the House of Representatives
- In office February 18, 1920 – August 16, 1922

Personal details
- Born: 23 March 1864 Csesznek, Kingdom of Hungary, Austrian Empire
- Died: 4 June 1946 (aged 82) Budapest, Second Hungarian Republic
- Party: Catholic People's Party (1901–1918); Christian Social People's Party (1918–1919); Christian National Union Party (KNEP) (1919–1921); National Smallholders and Agrarian Workers Party (OKGFP) (1921–1922)
- Spouse: Szidónia Kovács
- Children: Erzsébet; Margit; Sándor
- Relatives: Károly Simonyi (grandson), Charles Simonyi (great-grandson)
- Profession: politician, lawyer

Sándor Simonyi-Semadam (23 March 1864 – 4 June 1946) was a Hungarian lawyer and politician who served as prime minister from March to July 1920, best known for having overseen the signing of the Treaty of Trianon.

== Early life and politics ==
Sándor Semadam was born in Csesznek in 1864 to a Catholic bourgeois family. His father, József Semadam, was a civil servant married to Erzsébet Hock. He was adopted in 1898 by Sándor Dezső Simonyi, after which he added Simonyi to his surname. He studied law at the University of Budapest and in Germany, and also studied law and economics in St. Louis, U.S. After being called to the bar, Simonyi opened a legal practice. He also regularly published articles in journals related to politics and law, and traveled across the Americas, Africa, and Asia.

In 1901, Simonyi was elected as a deputy of the Catholic People's Party for Németújvár. His parliamentary career until 1918 was relatively unremarkable, and he went into retirement following the Aster Revolution. He was briefly imprisoned by the Hungarian Soviet Republic, and reentered politics in 1919 affiliated with the Christian National Union Party (KNEP). In 1920, he was elected to the newly reformed House of Representatives, of which he became the First Vice President.

Less than a month after Simonyi was reelected to the House of Representatives as a Vice President of the body, Regent Miklós Horthy appointed him as Prime Minister. He was simultaneously appointed Minister of Interior and Foreign Affairs, a post he held until April. Horthy was aware that whoever was appointed Prime Minister would have to sign the Treaty of Trianon, and all of his preferred candidates, including István Bethlen, refused to take on the "odious" task.

Simonyi sought to shore up the rule of law in Hungary as negotiations between the Hungarian delegation at Trianon (led by Albert Apponyi) and the Allies began to wind down, and spoke out against increasing antisemitic attacks in the country. He composed a government of KNEP and Smallholders' Party ministers. Of these, he dispatched Ágost Benárd and Alfréd Drasche-Lázár to Versailles to sign the treaty, which they did on 4 June. He submitted his resignation on 26 June and left office on 19 July, shortly before the treaty became effective. He was succeeded by Count Pál Teleki. Aside from finalizing the treaty and passing some financial reforms, Simonyi's government also conducted the 1920 parliamentary election in the Trans-Tisza region, which had been delayed by the Romanian occupation until Trianon was signed.

== Later life ==
After resigning, Simonyi reopened his law office. He remained active in the KNEP and, after the first royal coup in spring 1921, the Smallholders' Party. He retired from politics in 1922. From 1922 to 1924, he was one of the four members of the National Financial Council, and from 1932 to 1945 he was a commissioner of the Hungarian Mortgage Bank. He was appointed a privy councilor to Horthy in 1936.

Simonyi retained an interest in Asian topics throughout his life, and was a member of the Hungarian-Nippon Society, a society dedicated to the creation of cultural links between Japan and Hungary. His villa in Budapest incorporated eastern architectural styles. On 4 June 1946, the 26th anniversary of Trianon, Simonyi-Semadam died at home in Budapest. He had a son and two daughters; through his daughter Erzsébet he was the great-uncle and adoptive grandfather of physicist Károly Simonyi.

== See also ==
- Simonyi

Political offices
Preceded by Károly Huszár	Prime Minister of Hungary; 1920	Succeeded by Pál Teleki
Preceded by József Somssich	Minister of Foreign Affairs; Acting; 1920	Succeeded by Pál Teleki
Preceded by Ödön Beniczky	Minister of the Interior; Acting; 1920	Succeeded by Mihály Dömötör
