= Ágost Benárd =

Hungarian politician (1880–1968)

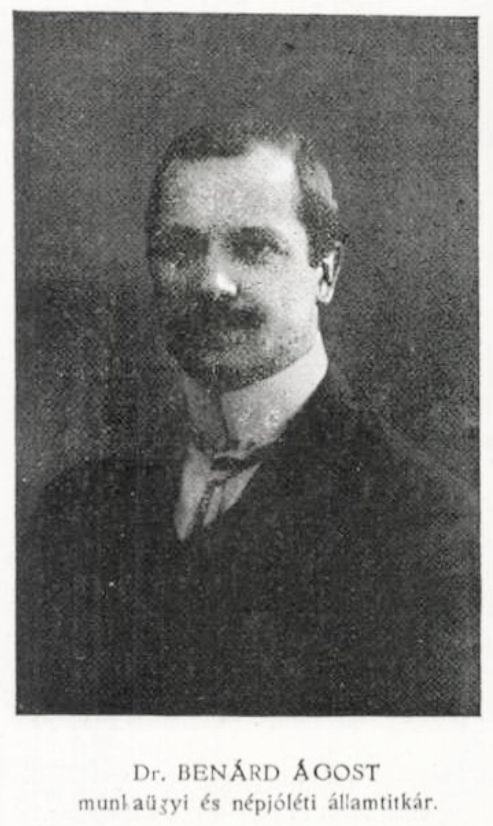
- Ágost Benárd, c. 1919

Minister of Public Welfare and Labour
- In office 19 July 1920 – 14 April 1921
- Prime Minister: Pál Teleki
- Preceded by: Károly Huszár (acting)
- Succeeded by: Nándor Bernolák

Personal details
- Born: Ágost Fülöp Benárd de Szilvágy; 3 January 1880 Budapest, Hungary
- Died: 22 June 1968 (aged 88) Balatonkenese, Hungary
- Party: KNEP (1919–1924), EP (1932–1939)

Ágost Fülöp Benárd de Szilvágy (3 January 1880 – 22 June 1968) was a Hungarian Christian socialist politician, diplomat, physician, and journalist.

Benárd served as Minister of Public Welfare and Labour of the Kingdom of Hungary from March 1920 to April 1921. He was one of two co-signatories of the Treaty of Trianon for Hungary, alongside Alfréd Drasche-Lázár.

== Early life ==
Ágost Benárd de Szilvágy was born on 3 January 1880 in Budapest. His parents were Lajos Benárd (1827–1885) and Emília Gáspár (1838–1907). His father was an employee of the Ministry of National Defense, and was given the noble title "de Szilvágy" in 1877, from his hometown of Szilvágyi.

Benárd attended a Piarist gymnasium in Pest and graduated from University of Budapest in 1905 with a medical degree. While in university, he engaged in political activism, organizing student protests in the aftermath of the 1905 parliamentary election.

== Career ==
After his graduation, Benárd began training to be a surgeon in Paris and Vienna. In 1909, he was hired by the Workmen's Insurance Society (Munkásbiztosító Pénztár) of Hungary to be a physician for members of the society.

In 1914, at the outbreak of World War I, Benárd enlisted in the Honvéd as a combat medic. He served for a total of fifty months as a doctor on the front lines of the war until 1917. In November 1918, Benárd began organizing armed demonstrations against Mihály Károlyi following the Aster Revolution. When the First Hungarian Republic collapsed in March 1919, Benárd was arrested by the newly-formed Hungarian Soviet Republic government for organizing anti-revolutionary activities and was sentenced to death. The day before his execution was set to be carried out, he escaped and fled to Vienna.

While in Vienna, Benárd joined the Antibolsevista Comité, an anti-Bolshevik organization led by István Bethlen, which convinced him to pursue a career in politics. With the fall of the Hungarian Soviet Republic in August 1919, Benárd returned to Budapest and joined the Christian National Union Party (KNEP). He returned to the Workers' Industrial Fund as director of the fund's branch in Várkerület. He was known for providing free treatment to impoverished people in Kelenföld and Lágymányos.

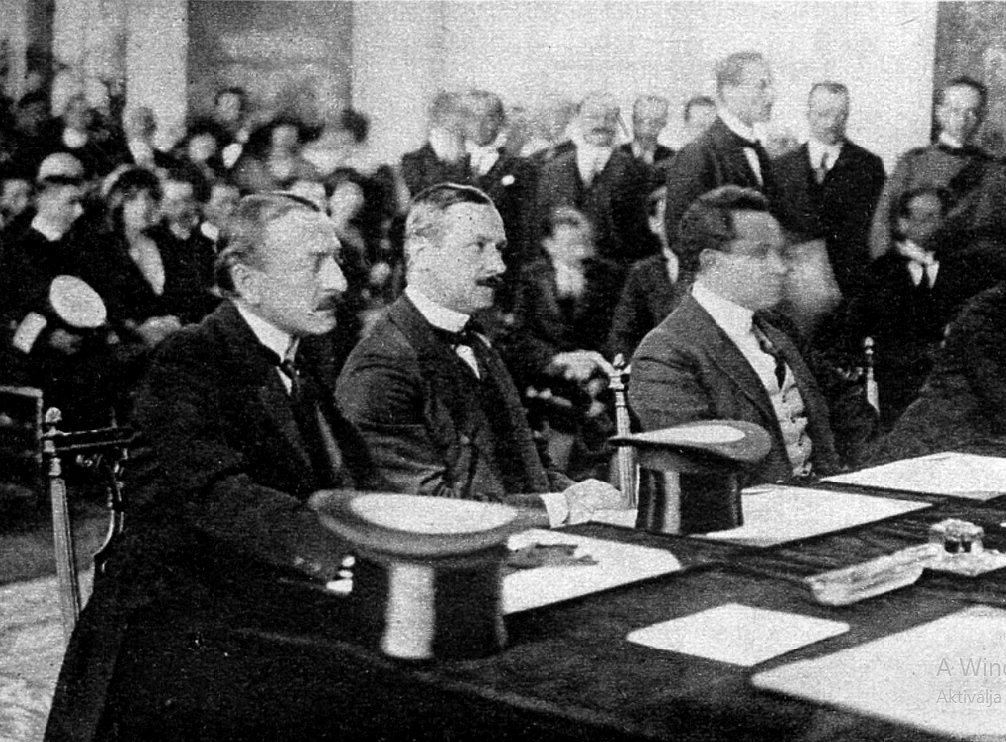
Alfréd Drasche-Lázár and Ágost Benárd sign the Treaty of Trianon on 4 June 1920

In November 1919, Benárd joined the Ministry of Public Welfare and Labor as an administrative secretary. When Sándor Simonyi-Semadam became Prime Minister in March 1920, he selected Benárd to be Minister of Public Welfare. From 1920 until 1922, he served as a representative of KNEP in the National Assembly. He was the first Minister of Public Welfare in the reunified Kingdom of Hungary following the collapse of the Austria-Hungary in 1918.

In June 1920, Benárd and Alfréd Drasche-Lázár were chosen by Simonyi-Semadam to travel to the Grand Trianon in Versailles to sign the Treaty of Trianon on behalf of Hungary. The treaty saw Hungary's withdrawal from WWI and the loss of 71% of its territory. Benárd was chosen for this position due to his role as Minister of Public Welfare, his positive public perception, and his strong Christian faith. He chose to sign it as a sign of protest against the communist revolutionaries.

In July 1921, President Miklós Horthy replaced Simonyi-Semadam with Pál Teleki as Prime Minister. Benárd served as Minister of Public Welfare under Teleki until April 1921, when Teleki was replaced by István Bethlen. After leaving parliament, he briefly worked as editor-in-chief of the right-wing political newspaper Nép and served as a representative of the Christian Village Party in the National Assembly. In 1924, feeling that the values of his party no longer aligned with his Christian socialist beliefs, he retired from politics.

Benárd's retirement would last eight years. In October 1932, Gyula Gömbös became Prime Minister, which inspired Benárd to get back into politics. He joined the national Unity Party and gained a reputation working for the organization in Buda. In 1935, he was elected as the Unity Party representative of the Veszprém electoral district in the National Assembly. He served for four years until 1939, when he retired from politics permanently due to the outbreak of World War II.

== Personal life ==
Ágost Benárd retired to the town of Balatonkenese, where he died on 22 June 1968. He married Róza Teréz Németh (1879–1958) in 1903 and the couple had four children together. He later married Etelka Mária Janka Jókay (1883–1973) in 1930. They did not have any children.

Benárd was known to speak French and Esperanto, as well as his native Hungarian. He was president of the Hungarian Esperanto Examination Committee.
