= The Girls' Middle School =

Private all-girls school in California, United States

Location
- 3400 W Bayshore Rd; Palo Alto, California 94303; United States; 37°26′08″N 122°06′36″W

Information
- Other name: GMS
- Type: Private all-girls middle school
- Motto: Fearless Learning. Boundless Joy. Endless Opportunity.
- Established: 1998; 28 years ago
- Founder: Kathleen Bennett
- NCES School ID: A0100935
- Head of school: Christine Fairless
- Grades: 6-8
- Gender: Girls
- Enrollment: 200 (2025)
- Average class size: 18 students
- Student to teacher ratio: 6:1
- Campus type: Suburban
- Color: Blue Yellow
- Athletics: Basketball, cross country, flag football, golf, skateboarding, soccer, softball, swimming, tennis, volleyball
- Athletics conference: CIF Central Coast Section: West Bay Athletic Middle School League
- Mascot: Gryphon
- Accreditation: ACS-WASC, CAIS
- Tuition: $52,500 (2026-27)
- Website: www.girlsms.org

The Girls' Middle School, commonly known as GMS, is an independent nonsectarian middle school for girls located in Palo Alto, California, United States. The school educates approximately 200 girls in grades 6-8 and is one of only two all-girls middle schools in the San Francisco Bay Area.

== Background ==
GMS was founded in Mountain View in 1998 by Kathleen Bennett, with a focus on educating girls in a girl-centric environment, particularly in mathematics, science, and engineering. A 2025 Town & Country article described the school as having an informal atmosphere with an emphasis on entrepreneurship.

The school was originally located at St Athanasius Church in Mountain View, and later moved in 2011 to its current location in Palo Alto.

== Academics ==
The student-to-teacher ratio at GMS is 6:1. National averages are 13:1 for private schools and 15:1 for public schools. In addition to Humanities, Spanish, Arts and Media, and Science, the school's math curriculum includes a High School Algebra I course aligned with the Common Core State Standards, and an optional Geometry class. The school teaches Computer Science across all three grades, and was cited in a 2020 Association for Computing Machinery and Computer Science Teachers Association report on gaps in K-12 Computer Science education in the United States.

GMS assesses student performance through narrative evaluations rather than traditional letter grades. The school also has dedicated Social and Emotional Learning classes.

The school is accredited by the ACS-WASC and the California Association of Independent Schools, and is a member of the National Association of Independent Schools and the International Coalition of Girls' Schools.

== Notable programs ==
=== Extracurricular ===
GMS offers extracurricular programs including:

- African dance
- Ceramics
- Metalworking
- Robotics
- Skateboarding (the school has its own skateboard ramp)
- Surfing
- Ukulele
- Video production
- Woodworking

Twice a year, the school suspends regular classes for a week-long "Intersession" experiential learning program offering activities including community service, rowing, debate, gardening, crochet, chocolate making, and songwriting.

In eighth grade, students participate in self-defense classes.

=== Entrepreneurial Program ===
In the Entrepreneurial Program during seventh grade, student teams form small companies with seed funding from the school, developing a business plan and designing, manufacturing, and marketing a physical product. Students learn about accounting, market research, and pitching to investors, with mentorship from members of the Silicon Valley business community.

=== Scholarship ===
The school operates the Bennett Scholars Program, which funds full three-year scholarships for ten students each year, many of whom are the first in their families to attend college.

The school holds an annual Bennett Scholars Breakfast as a fundraiser and to celebrate the school and its many alumnae. Past speakers at the breakfast include Kamala Harris, Barbara Boxer, Condoleezza Rice, Cecile Richards, Sheryl Sandberg, Stacy Brown-Philpot, Mary GrandPré, Diane Greene, Sylvia Acevedo, and Tara VanDerveer.

== Future site ==
In July 2025, it was announced that The Girls' Middle School will relocate to a new larger location at 3950 Fabian Way in Palo Alto, set to open in fall 2027. The new site will feature dedicated spaces for the school's robotics, woodwork, ceramics, and art programs, and accommodate an increased student body.

== Notable alumnae ==
- Julia Shapiro, guitarist/vocalist in Chastity Belt and Childbirth
