= Simoni =

Simoni is a surname. Notable people with the surname include:

- Alexandre Simoni (born 1979), Brazilian tennis player
- Dario Simoni (1901–1984), American set decorator
- Domingo Simoni, or Simoni Dall Croubelis (1727–1790), Danish composer
- Elisa Simoni (born 1973), Italian politician
- Ernest Simoni (born 1928), Albanian Roman Catholic cardinal
- Giampiero Simoni (born 1969), Italian racing driver
- Gilberto Simoni (born 1971), Italian professional road bicycle racer
- Giuseppe Simoni (born 1944), Italian biologist and scientist
- Gjon Simoni (1936–1999), Albanian musicologist and composer
- Jane M. Simoni, American clinical psychologist
- Luigi Simoni (1939–2020), Italian football manager
- Renato Simoni (1875–1952), Italian journalist
- Sabrina Simoni (born 1969), Italian conductor
- Simone Simoni (1532–1602), Italian philosopher and physician
- Ugo Simoni (born 1938), Italian former sports shooter
- Zef Simoni (1928–2009), Albanian Roman Catholic bishop

== See also ==
- Shimoni
- Simonyi
