= Károly Simonyi =

Hungarian physicist and writer (1916–2001)

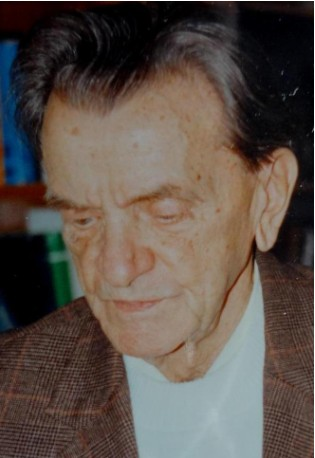
- Born: 18 October 1916; Egyházasfalu, Austria-Hungary
- Died: 9 October 2001 (aged 84); Budapest, Hungary
- Occupation: University professor
- Notable work: A Cultural History of Physics
- Spouse: Zsuzsa Simonyi
- Children: Tamás; Károly
- Relatives: Sándor Simonyi-Semadam (grandfather)

Károly Simonyi (18 October 1916 – 9 October 2001) was a Hungarian physicist and writer. He was professor of electrical engineering at Technical University of Budapest and the author of the popular tabletop book A Cultural History of Physics (A fizika kultúrtörténete, 1978).

He is the father of Charles Simonyi, a prominent computer-software executive who oversaw the creation of Microsoft Office.

== Biography ==
Simonyi was born the seventh of ten children in a small village in western Hungary. As a child, he was adopted by his aunt Erzsébet Simonyi-Semadam, the daughter of Sándor Simonyi-Semadam, who served as Prime Minister of Hungary in 1920. Simonyi earned degrees respectively in engineering at the Technical University of Budapest and in law at the University of Pecs. Following World War II, he taught electrical engineering at the University of Sopron and in 1952 he became a professor at the Technical University, where he was known as an outstanding teacher and organized the Department of Theoretical Electrical Engineering.

In the 1960s he lost his directorship at KFKI Physics Research Institute, his post as department head, and finally his professorial post due to the political climate in Hungary. He then undertook writing the story of the history of physics and the cultural, philosophical, and societal movements that had shaped and been shaped by its development.

One of the successor institutions of KFKI Physics Research Institute, the HUN-REN Wigner Research Centre for Physics organizes the Simonyi Day annually in his honor, featuring scientific lectures. His name is commemorated by numerous memorial plaques and statues in Hungary, as well as by the Károly Simonyi Memorial Plaquette of the Hungarian Nuclear Society. His memory is also preserved by the minor planet named 142275 Simonyi.
