= Charles Simonyi =

Hungarian-American billionaire software architect (b. 1948)

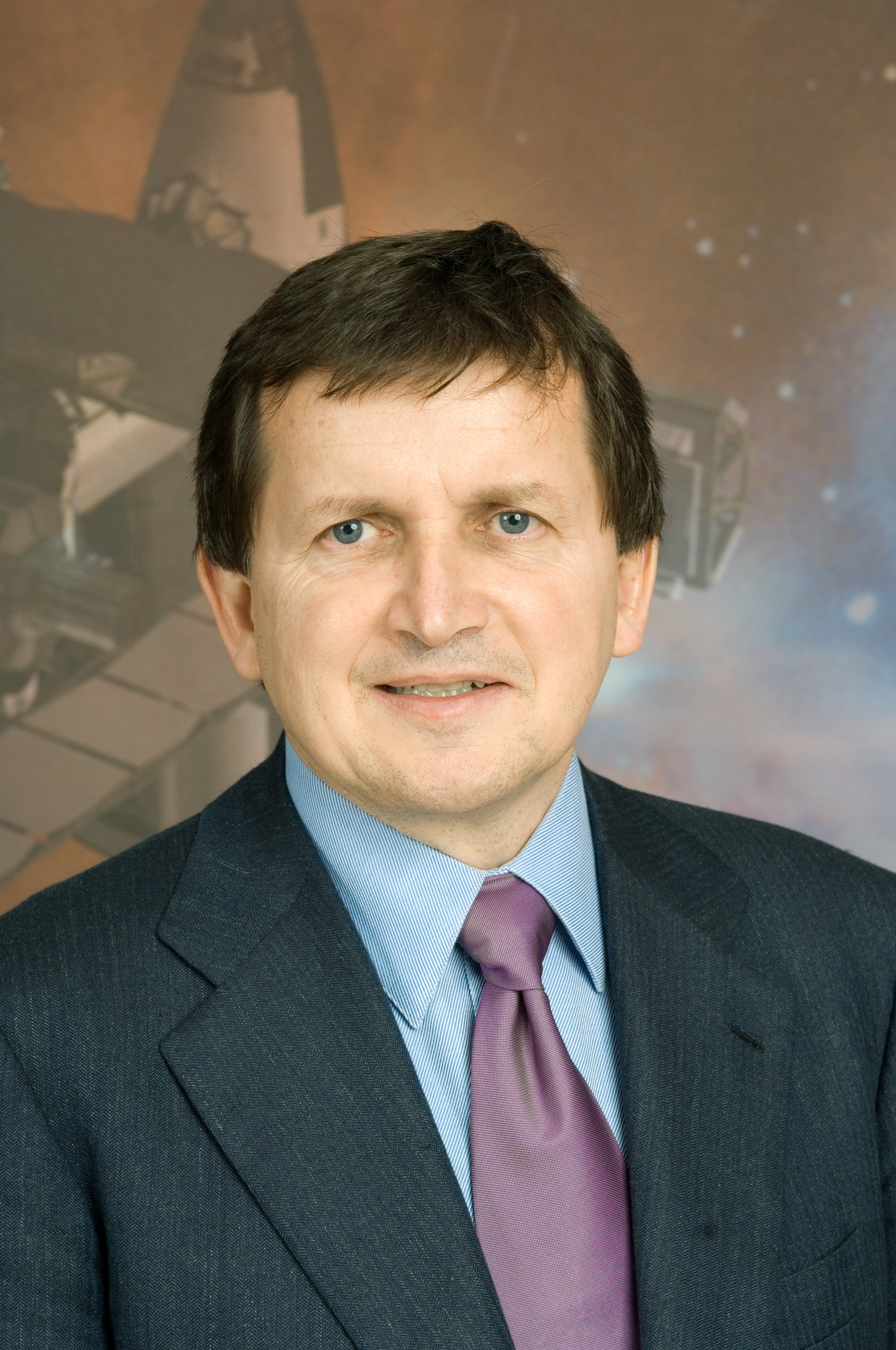
- Simonyi in 2006
- Born: September 10, 1948 (age 78); Budapest, Hungary
- Citizenship: Hungary; United States
- Education: University of California, Berkeley (BS); Stanford University (PhD)
- Occupation: Software architect
- Known for: Hungarian notation, space tourism, intentional programming
- Notable work: Microsoft Office
- Spouse: Lisa Persdotter (m. 2008)
- Children: 2
- Parents: Károly Simonyi (father); Zsuzsa Simonyi (mother)
- Relatives: Sándor Simonyi-Semadam (great-grandfather)
- Space career

Space Adventures tourist
- Time in space: 26d 14h 27m
- Mission: Soyuz TMA-10/TMA-9, Soyuz TMA-14/TMA-13

Charles Simonyi (/sɪˈmoʊni/; Hungarian: Simonyi Károly, pronounced [ˈʃimoɲi ˈkaːroj]; born September 10, 1948) is a Hungarian-American software architect, businessman, and space tourist. He led the development of Microsoft's first application software, including early versions of Microsoft Office, and later co-founded Intentional Software, a company focused on his concept of intentional programming. A former researcher at Xerox PARC, he helped pioneer graphical user interfaces and introduced object-oriented programming and Hungarian notation to Microsoft. Simonyi flew to space twice as a private citizen, becoming the fifth space tourist and the only one to pay for two separate trips to the International Space Station. As of January 2025, his net worth was estimated at US$7.5 billion.

== Biography ==
=== Early life ===
Simonyi was born in Budapest, Hungary. His father, Károly Simonyi, was a Kossuth Prize-winning professor of electrical engineering at the Technical University of Budapest, and created the first Hungarian nuclear particle accelerator. While in secondary school he worked part-time as a night watchman at a computer laboratory in the early 1960s, overseeing a large Soviet Ural II mainframe. He took an interest in computing and learned to program from one of the laboratory's engineers. By the time he left school, he had learned to develop compilers and sold one of these to a government department. He presented a demonstration of his compiler to the members of a Danish computer trade delegation. In 2006 he said that when he was young his dream was, "to get out of Hungary, go to the West and be free."

=== Career ===
Simonyi's early career and interests are described in the book Programmers at Work, a collection of interviews published by Microsoft Press.

At the age of 17, Simonyi left Hungary on a short-term visa but did not return. He was hired by Denmark's A/S Regnecentralen in 1966 where he worked with Per Brinch Hansen and Peter Kraft on the RC 4000 minicomputer's Real-time Control System, and with Peter Naur on the GIER ALGOL compiler.

He subsequently moved from Denmark to the United States in 1968 to attend the University of California, Berkeley, where he earned his BS in Engineering Mathematics & Statistics in 1972 under Butler Lampson. He has honorary doctorate degrees from the Juilliard School in New York and from the University of Pécs in Hungary.

Simonyi was recruited to Xerox PARC by Butler Lampson during its most productive period, working alongside Lampson, Alan Kay and Robert Metcalfe on the development of the Xerox Alto, one of the first personal computers. He and Lampson developed Bravo, the first WYSIWYG document preparation program, which became operational in 1974. During this time he received his PhD in computer science from Stanford University in 1977 with a dissertation on a software project management technique he called meta-programming. This approach sought to defeat Brooks' law by scaling programming through a formalization of communication among programmers. In the 1992 book Accidental Empires (ISBN 0-88730-855-4), Robert X. Cringely gave this description:

Simonyi's dissertation was an attempt to describe a more efficient method of organizing programmers to write software... the metaprogrammer was the designer, decision maker, and communication controller in a software development group.... individual programmers were allowed to make no design decisions about the project. All they did was write the code as described by the metaprogrammer.... A programmer with a problem or a question would take it to the metaprogrammer, who could come up with an answer or transfer the question to another programmer...

Simonyi remained at PARC until 1981.

In 1997, Simonyi was elected a member of the National Academy of Engineering for developing widely used desktop productivity software. He also became a member of the American Academy of Arts and Sciences in 2008. Since 1998 Simonyi has served as member of the Board of Trustees of the Institute for Advanced Study in Princeton and was its Chairman in 2008. Simonyi received the Golden Plate Award of the American Academy of Achievement in 2000.

=== Microsoft ===
In 1981, at Metcalfe's suggestion, he visited Bill Gates at Microsoft who suggested Simonyi start an applications group at Microsoft with the first application being a WYSIWYG word processor. At Microsoft, Simonyi built the organization and applications of what became its most profitable products, Word and Excel, as well as Excel's predecessor Multiplan. For the applications, Simonyi pursued a strategy called the "revenue bomb", whereby the product ran on a virtual machine that was ported to each platform. The resulting applications were highly portable, although Microsoft's focus and IBM's standardization on MS-DOS eventually made portability less important.

In a 2002 news item, The Age noted that Simonyi introduced the concept of metaprogramming at Microsoft, turning it into what people sometimes referred to as a software factory, but the metaprogramming concept "did not work out in practice."

Simonyi introduced to Microsoft the techniques of object-oriented programming that he had learned at Xerox. He developed the Hungarian notation convention for naming variables. These standards were originally part of his doctoral thesis. The Hungarian notation has been widely used inside Microsoft.

=== Intentional Software ===
Simonyi remained at Microsoft during its rapid rise in the software industry, becoming one of its highest-ranking developers. He left Microsoft in 2002 to co-found, with business partner Gregor Kiczales, a company called Intentional Software. This company markets the intentional programming concepts Simonyi developed at Microsoft Research. In this approach to software, a programmer first builds a language environment specific to a given problem domain (such as life insurance). Domain experts, aided by the programmer, then describe the program's intended behavior in a What You See Is What You Get (WYSIWYG)-like manner. An automated system uses the program description and the language to generate the final program. Successive changes are only done at the WYSIWYG level.

In 2004, Simonyi received the Wharton Infosys Business Transformation Award for the industry-wide impact of his innovative work in information technology.

On April 18, 2017, Intentional Software was acquired by Microsoft.

=== Patents ===
Simonyi holds 11 patents (Espacenet):

US patent 6070007, US patent 6665866, US patent 2001037496, WO patent 2004102380, WO patent 2007053833, WO patent 2007076269, EP patent 1923782, JP patent 2008140410, US patent 2010146377, JP patent 2010146583, and US patent 2010229092

=== Philanthropy ===
Simonyi has been an active philanthropist.

He has funded the establishment of three professorships:

- In 1995, the Simonyi Professorship of the Public Understanding of Science at Oxford University, first held by Richard Dawkins (1995-2008), currently by Marcus du Sautoy
- A Simonyi Professorship for Innovation in Teaching endowed chair at Stanford University, held by Eric S. Roberts 1997-2002
- In 2005, as part of $25 million donation, a Simonyi Professorship of Mathematical Physics at the Institute for Advanced Study in Princeton, New Jersey, held by Edward Witten 2005–present.

In 2003 he founded the Charles and Lisa Simonyi Fund for Arts and Sciences, a nonprofit organization based in Seattle. The foundation provides grants to outstanding organization in art, sciences and education. Grant recipients have included the Seattle Symphony ($10 million), and the Seattle Public Library ($3 million), the Metropolitan Opera, the Juilliard School and the Vera C. Rubin Observatory, which host the Simonyi Survey Telescope. The $100 million foundation closed in 2013.

In February 2017, Simonyi and his wife Lisa gave the University of Washington Computer Science and Engineering (CSE) department $5 million towards the completion of a new building.

=== Political activity ===
Simonyi was one of few notable early supporters of Donald Trump's 2016 presidential campaign when he made the maximum primary donation of $2,700 in 2015. Simonyi went on to contribute $200,000 to Donald Trump's 2020 presidential campaign.

OpenSecrets shows Simonyi has contributed to numerous Republican candidates, the Republican National Committee, and several state Republican committees.

== Personal life ==
Simonyi became a United States citizen in 1982. He was in a long-term relationship with businesswoman Martha Stewart, which lasted 15 years and ended in 2008. Later that year, on November 22, he married Lisa Persdotter, the daughter of a Swedish businessman, in a private ceremony in Gothenburg, Sweden, attended by close friends including Bill Gates. The couple has two daughters.

Simonyi resides in Medina, Washington, in a modern home known as Villa Simonyi, designed by architect Wendell Lovett and featuring a collection of works by Roy Lichtenstein and Victor Vasarely. He formerly spent part of each year aboard his 233-foot (71 m) yacht Skat, which he sold in 2021. As of 2023, he owns a 295-foot (90 m) yacht named NORN, designed by Espen Oeino and registered in the Cayman Islands.

== Spaceflights ==
In early 2006, Simonyi expressed interest in becoming a space tourist and signed agreements with the space tourism company, Space Adventures, Ltd., for a ten-day mission to the International Space Station (ISS).

In August 2006, he passed a pre-qualification medical exam by the Russian Federal Space Agency, called the State Medical Commission (GMK). He started training at Star City in September 2006.

He launched on April 7, 2007 (GMT), on board Soyuz TMA-10. He shared a ride with two Russian cosmonauts to the International Space Station, and returned aboard Soyuz TMA-9, landing on April 21, 2007.

Upon arrival to the ISS on April 9, 2007, Simonyi said, "It is amazing how it appears from the blackness of the sky. It was very, very dramatic. It was like a big stage set, a fantastic production of some incredible opera or modern play. That's what I was referring to when I said I was blown away."

Simonyi's expected return on April 20, 2007, was delayed by one day due to 'boggy ground'. He returned to Earth on April 21, 2007 along with an American astronaut and a Russian cosmonaut.

In October 2008, he booked for a second trip to the ISS through Space Adventures on board Soyuz TMA-14. On March 26, 2009 he returned to space aboard Soyuz TMA-14. He returned to Earth on board Soyuz TMA-13. Along with Soyuz Commander Yuri Lonchakov and Michael Fincke, Simonyi landed in Kazakhstan on April 8, 2009.

Simonyi became the second Hungarian astronaut, the fifth space tourist, and the only one in history who went twice to space as a space tourist who paid his own way on spaceflights. Earlier, the Hungarians were the seventh nation to be represented in space, in 1980, by Bertalan Farkas's spaceflight, 27 years before Simonyi's first one, in 2007. The next Hungarian astronaut followed Simonyi to the International Space Station in 2025.

=== Radio communication while aboard ISS ===
Charles Simonyi is a licensed amateur radio operator with the call sign KE7KDP, and planned to contact a number of schools while on his flight on the International Space Station using amateur radio for the communication with those schools. On April 11, 2007 the American Radio Relay League reported that Simonyi was already making ham radio contacts from space.

One of the schools Simonyi contacted was Cedar Point Elementary in Bristow, Virginia. A telebridge conversation was held on Tuesday, April 17, 2007. On board with him were Oleg Kotov and Fyodor Yurchikhin. On March 30, 2009 he held a phone conversation with students at The Girls' Middle School in Mountain View, California, United States in which he said that one of the most surprising things about traveling to space was that upon returning to Earth the air feels very thick, very heavy, like "breathing Pepto-Bismol." He also stated that talking with the students from the school "made his day."

Simonyi used his Hungarian call sign HA5SIK when he contacted 25 radio amateurs from Hungary in a record attempt on April 12. He contacted former and current students of Tivadar Puskás Polytechnic, Budapest on April 13.

Simonyi supports The Museum of Flight in Seattle, funding the Space Gallery housing the NASA Shuttle Trainer and many space artifacts.

== In popular culture ==
Simonyi was portrayed by actor Brian Lester in the TV film Pirates of Silicon Valley.

== See also ==
- Hungarian notation
