= Booster Fuels =

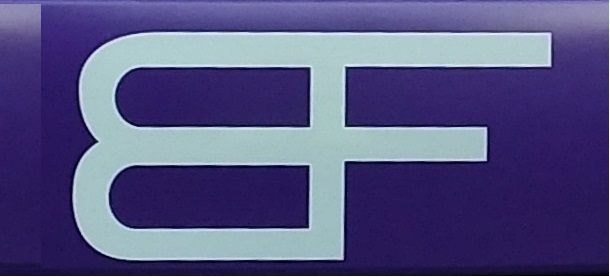
- Type: Private
- Industry: Fuel
- Founded: 2015
- Founders: Frank Mycroft; Diego Netto; Tyler Raugh; Brandon Darcy (Founding Driver)
- Headquarters: San Mateo, California, United States
- Area served: Dallas, San Francisco Bay Area, Orange County, California
- Key people: Frank Mycroft (CEO); Joseph Okpaku (Chief Policy Officer)
- Products: Gasoline (Regular, Premium)
- Revenue: ▲$65 Million(2018)
- Number of employees: 200

Booster Fuels is a company that develops an app-based service (also called Booster Fuels) to deliver and pump gas in office parking lots. The San Mateo, California-based startup partners with campus-based companies, commercial real estate owners, universities, and commercial fleets. The company has stated that it serves tens of thousands of commuters working at more than 300 companies, including Cisco, Oracle, eBay, Pepsico, and Facebook.

== History ==
Booster Fuels was founded in 2015 by Frank Mycroft, Diego Netto and Tyler Raugh. In its first 18 months, the company reportedly delivered more than 3 million gallons of gasoline to its customers in the San Francisco Bay and Dallas-Fort Worth suburbs. By the end of 2020, Booster had announced expansion into new markets including Seattle, Washington D.C. and Maryland.

== Business ==
Booster Fuels' service delivers fuel to fleet and office and commercial parking lots using company-branded purple fuel trucks. Customers order fuel through contracts they have with Booster, either as companies to fuel fleet vehicles or as individuals requesting fuel while parked, who may do so using a mobile application. The company is required to have a permit in each city it services.

== Funding ==
Booster Fuels received $3.1 million in a 2015 funding round from venture capital firms. By 2016 the company raised $9 million in a Series A funding round from Maveron, Madrona Venture Group, Version One Ventures and RRE Ventures. By August 2017, the company had raised $20 million in funding from a round led by Conversion Capital. In 2019, Booster completed its Series C funding, raising an additional $55 million.

Funding
Year	Amount
2019	$55 million
2017	$20 million
2016	$9 million
2015	$3 million
