= Shimoni (surname) =

Shimoni (Hebrew: שמעוני) is a Hebrew patronymic surname literally meaning "sesxcendant of Shimon. Notable people with the surname include:

- David Shimoni, Israeli poet, writer, and translator
- Haviv Shimoni (1933–1994), Israeli politician
- Itamar Shimoni, Israeli politician
- Kobi Shimoni or Subliminal (rapper) (born 1979), Israeli rapper

== See also ==
- Simoni
- Yalkut Shimoni
- Shimony
